= Same-sex marriage in Querétaro =

Same-sex marriage has been legal in Querétaro since 13 November 2021. On 22 September 2021, the Legislature of Querétaro passed a law legalizing same-sex marriage. It was published in the state's official gazette on 12 November, and took effect the following day. Querétaro was the 22nd Mexican state to legalize same-sex marriage. Previously, same-sex couples could marry in eight of the eighteen municipalities of Querétaro, comprising 60% of the state's population.

== Legal history ==
=== Background ===
The Supreme Court of Justice of the Nation ruled on 12 June 2015 that state bans on same-sex marriage are unconstitutional nationwide. The court's ruling is considered a "jurisprudential thesis" and did not invalidate state laws, meaning that same-sex couples denied the right to marry would still have to seek individual amparos in court. The ruling standardized the procedures for judges and courts throughout Mexico to approve all applications for same-sex marriages and made the approval mandatory. Specifically, the court ruled that bans on same-sex marriage violate Articles 1 and 4 of the Constitution of Mexico. Article 1 of the Constitution states:

Any form of discrimination, based on ethnic or national origin, gender, age, disabilities, social status, medical conditions, religion, opinions, sexual orientation, marital status, or any other form, which violates the human dignity or seeks to annul or diminish the rights and freedoms of the people, is prohibited. (Note: In some official and indigenous languages of Querétaro: Spanish: Queda prohibida toda discriminación motivada por origen étnico o nacional, el género, la edad, las discapacidades, la condición social, las condiciones de salud, la religión, las opiniones, las preferencias sexuales, el estado civil o cualquier otra que atente contra la dignidad humana y tenga por objeto anular o menoscabar los derechos y libertades de las personas.; Otomi: Hingi tsa da t’utsa ya jä’i num’u ngu ra mengu ka ya hnini hñätho, ne ha ra ñ’oho ua ra m’ehñä, ra jeya gä mets’i, ha nxotho ra jä’i, hä ua hin’ä bojä, ha hingi dathi, ne te ma nijä pa, xa nthäti ua hin’ä ne ha ua ma n’a ngu embi t’uni ra m’ui gä mu’i di thegi di mu’i ra n’yo ya jä’i.)

In early 2014, two same-sex couples filed an amparo seeking the right to marry, which a court granted on 11 August 2014. One of the plaintiff couples, María López Gallegos and Mariana Vega Mendoza, married in Querétaro on 4 October 2014, and the second couple, Guillermo and Miguel Ángel, married on 17 January 2015 in the same city. Another amparo was requested in the first week of October 2014. It was successful, and the marriage was performed on 28 January 2015. A fourth same-sex marriage took place on 31 January. In addition, an amparo involving 55 people was approved by a federal judge on 23 April 2015. By October 2017, 13 amparos had been granted in Querétaro.

=== Legislative action ===
In September 2014, it was announced that the Legislature of Querétaro would be considering a civil union bill drafted by the state's ombudsman, Miguel Nava Alvarado. Originally conceptualized as a same-sex marriage bill, it was then changed to establish civil unions offering some of the rights and benefits of marriage. On 28 November 2014, Deputy Luis Nava Guerrero said that the legislation would be postponed to 2015, though eventually no vote occurred. On 13 June 2016, the President of the Legislature of Querétaro, Eric Salas González, said that lawmakers would wait until same-sex marriage is legislated at the federal level before changing local laws. On 4 February 2016, the Youth Legislature 2016 approved a motion, in a 38–8 vote, expressing support for same-sex marriage.

A bill legalizing same-sex marriage, same-sex concubinage and adoption by same-sex couples was introduced to the Legislature by Deputy Laura Polo Herrera of the National Regeneration Movement (MORENA) on 19 December 2018. A spokesman for the conservative National Action Party (PAN) expressed support for an analysis of the draft bill. Progress on the measure stalled over the following three years due to opposition from conservative lawmakers. In November 2020, Deputy Néstor Domínguez Luna urged the Legislature to discuss and pass the bill, and in March 2021 a federal judge from the Sixth District Court ordered the Legislature to debate it. On 22 September 2021, the Legislature approved the bill in a 20–3 vote. The law was published in the state's official gazette on 12 November, and took effect the following day, Saturday 13 November 2021. It was published by the Legislature rather than by Governor Mauricio Kuri, who had refused to sign the bill into law. The first same-sex marriage performed under the law took place in the city of Querétaro on 3 December 2021 between Osmin Reyes Manzano and Juan Pablo Dorantes. Article 137 of the Civil Code of Querétaro was amended to read: Marriage is an institution in which a legal bond is established through the union of two people who, with equal rights and obligations, form the foundation for the birth and stability of a family, as well as the realization of a full and responsible shared life. (Note: Spanish: El matrimonio es una institución en la que se establece un vínculo jurídico por la unión entre dos personas que, con igualdad de derechos y obligaciones, son la base del nacimiento y estabilidad de una familia, así como la realización de una comunidad de vida plena y responsable.)

22 September 2021 vote in the Legislature
Party	Voted for	Voted against	Abstained	Absent (Did not vote)
National Action Party	9: Santiago Alegría Salinas; Luis Ángeles Herrera; José González Ruiz; Beatriz Marmolejo Rojas; Tania Palacios Kuri; Francisco Ramírez Andrade; Leticia Rubio Montes; Martha Salgado Márquez; Antonio Zapata Guerrero	–	–	2: Verónica Hernández Flores; Miguel Torres Olguín
National Regeneration Movement	6: Paloma Arce Islas; José Chávez Nieto; Néstor Domínguez Luna; Martha Larrondo Montes; Laura Polo Herrera; Mauricio Ruiz Olaes	–	–	–
Institutional Revolutionary Party	3: Abigail Arredondo Ramos; María Cárdenas Molina; Karina Careaga Pineda	1: José Cabrera Ruiz	–	–
Ecologist Green Party of Mexico	1: Jorge Herrera Martínez	–	–	–
Querétaro Independiente	–	1: María Herrera Martínez	–	–
Social Encounter Party	1: Ricardo Caballero González	–	–	–
Independent	–	1: Elsa Méndez Álvarez	–	–
Total	20	3	0	2
Total	80.0%	12.0%	0.0%	8.0%

Article 273 of the Civil Code relating to concubinage was also amended: Concubinage is the union between two people, free of any marriage ties, with the purpose of forming a family and establishing a shared life based on equal rights and obligations. (Note: Spanish: El concubinato es la unión entre dos personas, libres de matrimonio, con el propósito de integrar una familia y realizar una comunidad de vida con igualdad de derechos y obligaciones.) Opponents subsequently attempted to force a referendum on the legislation, which required gathering 51,852 valid signatures, representing 3% of the state's voters. In January 2022, the State Electoral Institute announced that the proposed referendum would not proceed as the opponents had only collected 8,186 signatures by the deadline.

=== Municipalities issuing marriage licenses ===
Prior to the statewide legalization of same-sex marriage in November 2021, same-sex couples could legally marry without the need to file an amparo in eight municipalities of Querétaro, comprising 60% of the state's population. The civil registrar of the city of Querétaro announced on 21 July 2015 that the municipality would begin accepting marriage applications from same-sex couples. Seven more municipalities had followed suit by 4 January 2017; they were Amealco de Bonfil, Cadereyta de Montes, Ezequiel Montes, Huimilpan, Pedro Escobedo, San Joaquín, and Tolimán. The municipalities of Colón, Corregidora and Pinal de Amoles reiterated in January 2017 that they explicitly required same-sex couples to receive an amparo in order to get married.

In 2019, in an attempt to stop the issuance of marriage licenses to same-sex couples in the city of Querétaro, state authorities launched criminal proceedings against Municipal President Luis Nava Guerrero. The municipality stopped issuing licenses to same-sex couples in 2019, but began doing so once again in May 2021.

== Marriage statistics ==
The following table shows the number of same-sex marriages performed in Querétaro as reported by the National Institute of Statistics and Geography. The number of same-sex marriages dropped in 2019 after the city of Querétaro stopped issuing marriage licenses. Figures for 2020 are also lower than previous years because of the restrictions in place due to the COVID-19 pandemic.

Number of marriages performed in Querétaro
Year	Same-sex			Opposite-sex	Total	% same-sex
Year	Female	Male	Total	Opposite-sex	Total	% same-sex
2015	3	2	5	9,470	9,475	0.05%
2016	14	6	20	9,085	9,105	0.22%
2017	14	18	32	9,555	9,587	0.33%
2018	27	17	44	8,642	8,686	0.51%
2019	2	5	7	8,848	8,855	0.08%
2020	4	5	9	5,622	5,631	0.16%
2021	23	19	42	7,999	8,038	0.52%
2022	105	66	171	9,470	9,641	1.77%
2023	90	58	148	9,155	9,303	1.59%
2024	100	86	186	8,767	8,953	2.08%

== Public opinion ==
A 2017 opinion poll conducted by the Strategic Communication Office (Gabinete de Comunicación Estratégica) found that 54% of Querétaro residents supported same-sex marriage, while 43% were opposed. According to a 2018 survey by the National Institute of Statistics and Geography, 32% of the Querétaro public opposed same-sex marriage.

A 2020 survey by the Autonomous University of Querétaro showed that 63% of Querétaro residents supported same-sex marriage, with support rising to 67% in the city of Querétaro.

== See also ==
- Same-sex marriage in Mexico
- LGBT rights in Mexico
