= 5th federal electoral district of Querétaro =

Federal electoral district of Mexico

Querétaro's 5th
- Electoral district of the Chamber of Deputies of Mexico

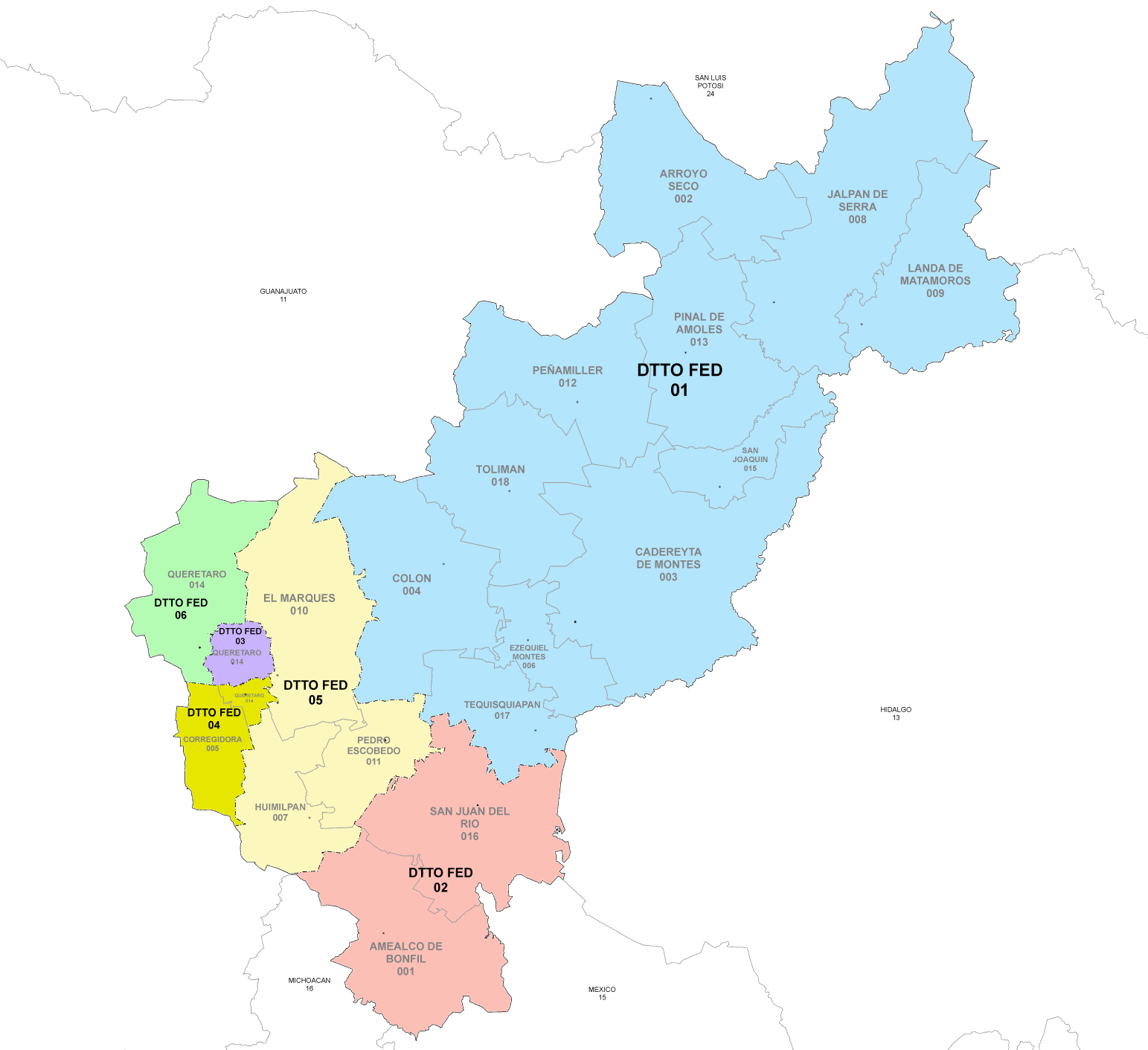
- 5th district since 2023

Incumbent
- Member: Mario Calzada Mercado
- Party: ▌Institutional Revolutionary Party
- Congress: 66th (2024–2027)

District
- State: Querétaro
- Head town: Pedro Escobedo
- Coordinates: 20°30′N 100°08′W
- Covers: Pedro Escobedo, Huimilpan, El Marqués
- PR region: Fifth
- Precincts: 73
- Population: 346,002 (2020 census)

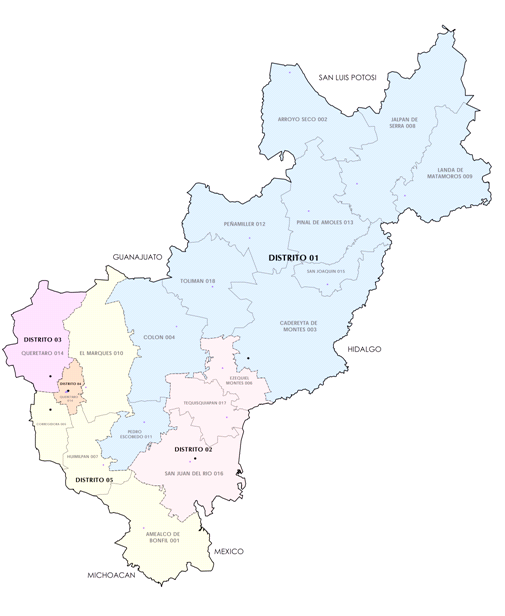
Querétaro under the 2017–2022 districting plan

The 5th federal electoral district of Querétaro (Spanish: Distrito electoral federal 05 de Querétaro) is one of the 300 electoral districts into which Mexico is divided for elections to the federal Chamber of Deputies and one of six such districts in the state of Querétaro.

It elects one deputy to the lower house of Congress for each three-year legislative session by means of the first-past-the-post system. Votes cast in this district also count towards the calculation of proportional representation ("plurinominal") deputies; since 2024, those elected from the fifth region.

The 5th district was created as part of the 2017 districting process and has therefore only returned deputies to Congress since the 2018 general election.

The current member for the district, elected in the 2024 general election, is Mario Calzada Mercado of the Institutional Revolutionary Party (PRI).

== District territory ==
Under the 2023 districting plan adopted by the National Electoral Institute (INE), which assigned Querétaro an additional seat in Congress and is to be used for the 2024, 2027 and 2030 federal elections, the 5th district covers 73 precincts (secciones electorales) across three of the state's 18 municipalities:

- Pedro Escobedo, Huimilpan and El Marqués.

The head town (cabecera distrital), where results from individual polling stations are gathered together and tallied, is the city of Pedro Escobedo. The district reported a population of 346,002 in the 2020 census.

== Previous districting schemes ==
Evolution of electoral district numbers
	1974	1978	1996	2005	2017	2023
Querétaro	2	3	4	4	5	6
Chamber of Deputies	196	300				

2017–2022

Between 2017 and 2022, when the state contained only five federal electoral districts, the 5th covered four municipalities:
- Amealco de Bonfil, Corregidora, Huimilpan and El Marqués.
The head town was at El Pueblito, the seat of the municipality of Corregidora.

== Deputies returned to Congress ==
(Mexico) National parties
- Current
- PAN
- PRI
- PT
- PVEM
- MC
- Morena
- PAZ
- Somos
- Defunct or local only
- PLM
- PNR
- PRM
- PNM
- PP
- PPS
- PARM
- PFCRN
- CON
- PANAL
- PSD
- PES
- PES
- PRD

Querétaro's 5th district
Election	Deputy	Party	Term	Legislature
2018	Ana Paola López Birlain	National Action Party (Mexico)	2018–2021	64th Congress
2021	Erika Díaz Villalón	National Action Party (Mexico)	2021–2024	65th Congress
2024	Mario Calzada Mercado	Institutional Revolutionary Party	2024–2027	66th Congress

== Presidential elections ==
Querétaro's 5th district
Election	District won by	Party or coalition	%
2018	Ricardo Anaya Cortés	Por México al Frente	38.8254
2024	Claudia Sheinbaum Pardo	Sigamos Haciendo Historia	53.3000
