= Colón Municipality =

Colón Municipality may refer to:

- Colón, Putumayo, Colombia
- Colón Municipality, Querétaro, Mexico
- Colón Municipality, Zulia, Venezuela
