= Tequisquiapan Municipality =

Coordinates: 20.5206°N 99.8958°W

Tequisquiapan
- Municipality
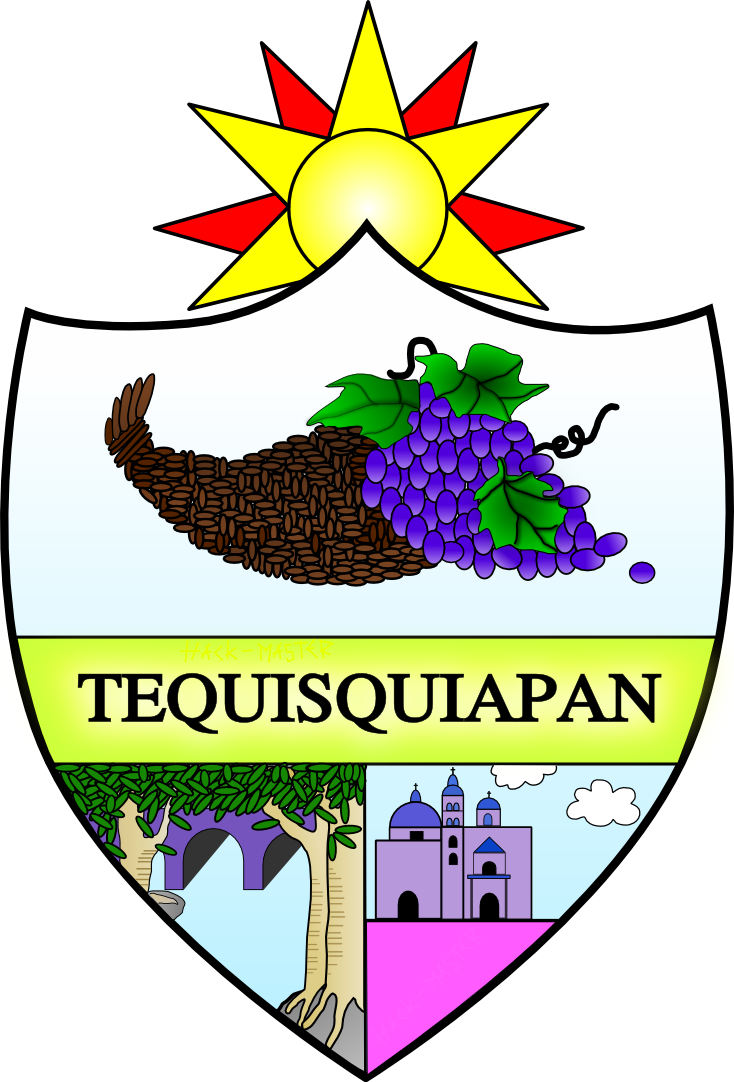
- Coat of arms
- Interactive map of Tequisquiapan
- Country: Mexico
- State: Querétaro
- Municipal seat: Tequisquiapan
- Time zone: UTC-6 (Central)

Tequisquiapan is a municipality in the central Mexican state of Querétaro. The municipal seat is at Tequisquiapan.
