= Centro de Investigación y Desarrollo Tecnológico en Electroquímica =

- Type: Public
- Established: 26 September 1991
- Affiliations: CONACYT
- Director: René Antaño López
- Location: Pedro Escobedo, Querétaro, Mexico
- Colors: Blue and White
- Website: www.cideteq.mx

Centro de Investigación y Desarrollo Tecnológico en Electroquímica (CIDETEQ, and in English: Center of Research and Technologic Development in Electrochemistry) is one of 27 Public Research Centers in Mexico, funded by CONACyT. It was founded on 1991.

== Academic ==
- Master in Electrochemistry
- Master in Science and Technology
- Doctorade in Electrochemistry
- Doctorade in Science and Technology

== Research Areas ==
- Electrochemistry
- Energy
- Environmental
