= Tequisquiapan =

- Town & Municipality
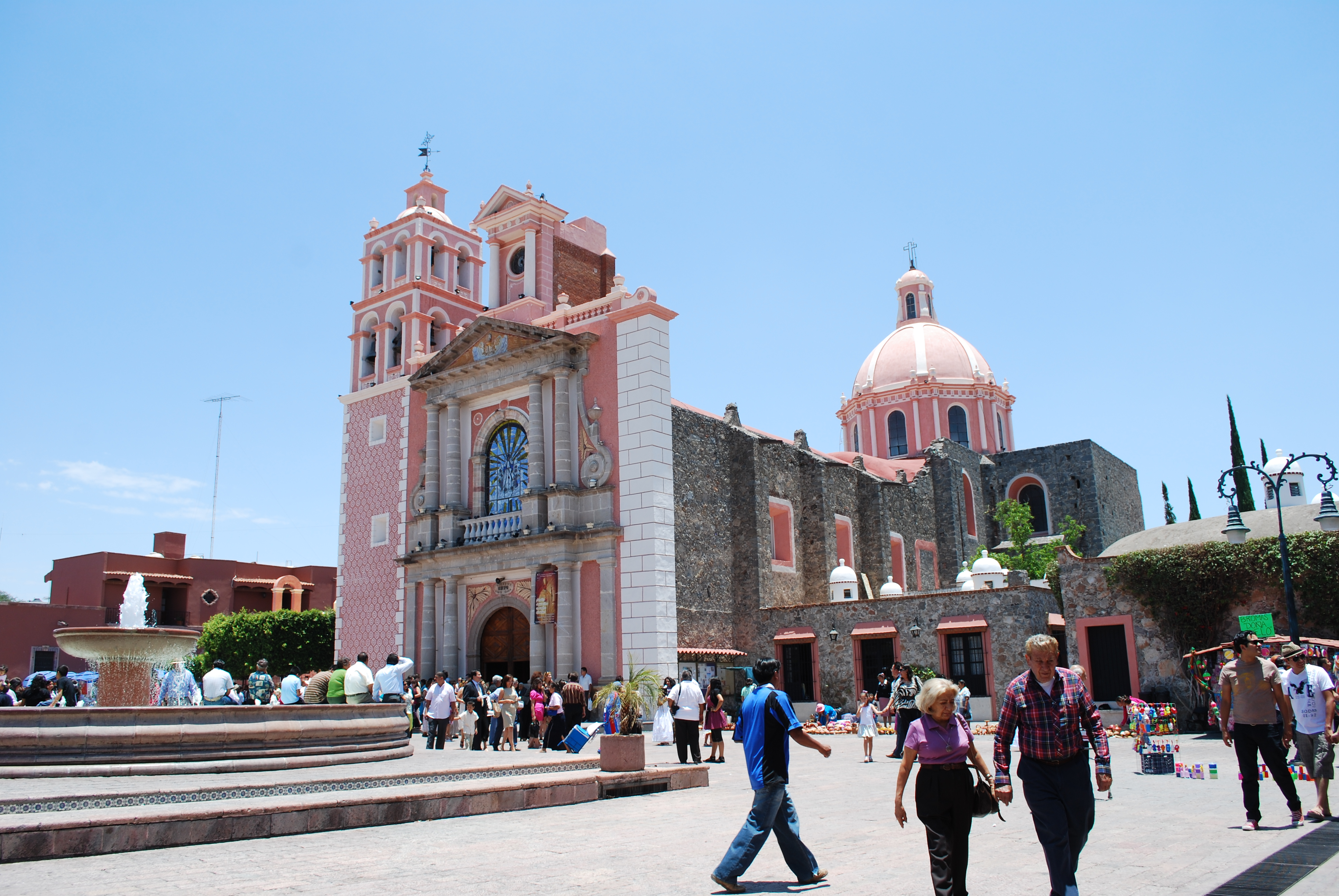
- Iglesia Santa María de la Asunción at the Main Plaza of Tequisquiapan

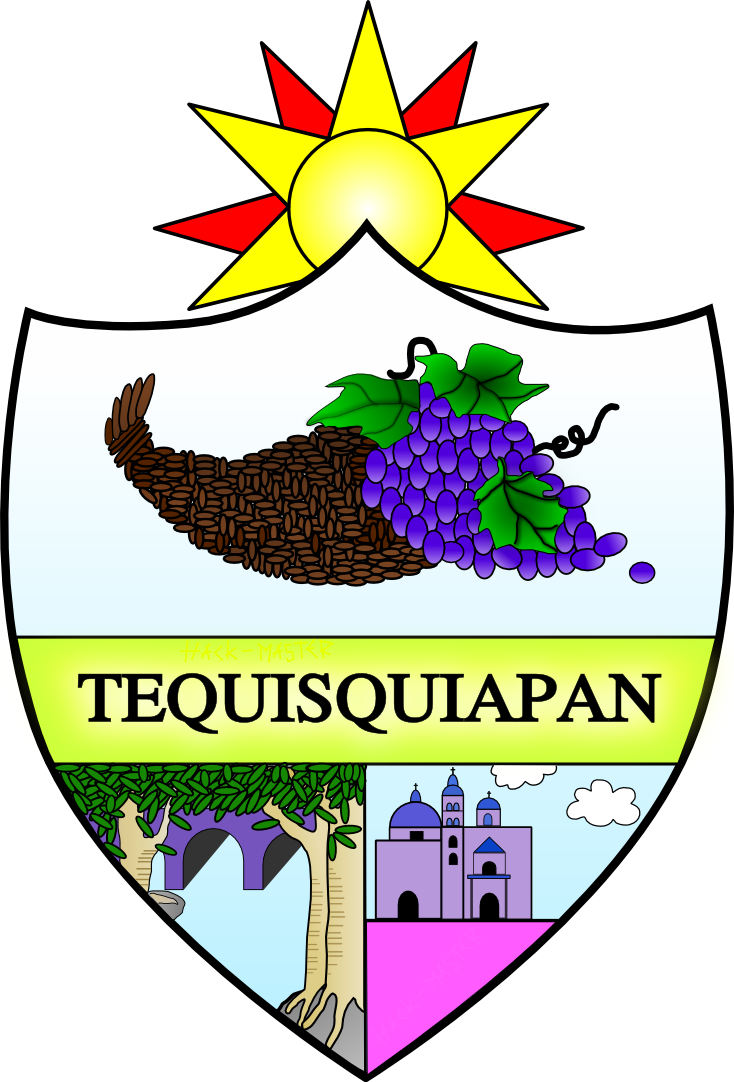
- Seal

- Location in Mexico
- Coordinates: 20°31′14″N 99°53′45″W
- Country: Mexico
- State: Querétaro
- Founded: 1551
- Municipal Status: 1939

Government
  - Municipal President: Héctor Magaña Rentería

Area
  - Municipality: 343.6 km^{2} (132.7 sq mi)
- Elevation (of seat): 1,880 m (6,170 ft)

Population (2005) Municipality
  - Municipality: 54,929
  - Seat: 26,858
- Time zone: UTC-6 (Central (US Central))
- Postal code (of seat): 76750
- Area code: 414
- Website: www.tequisquiapanqueretaro.gob.mx (in Spanish)

Tequisquiapan (Spanish pronunciation: [tekis'kjapan]; Otomi: Ntʼe) is a town and municipality located in the southeast of the state of Querétaro in central Mexico. The center of the town has cobblestone streets, traditional rustic houses with wrought iron fixtures, balconies, and wooden windowsills, which is the legacy of its 300-year heritage as a colonial town populated mostly by indigenous people. This, the climate, and the local natural water springs have made the town a popular weekend getaway for cities such as Querétaro and Mexico City, which has led to the construction of weekend homes in the town.

Tequisquiapan is part of Querétaro's Ruta de Vino (Wine Route) with La Redonda as the municipality's major producer. Grape production began in the early 1960s, but has become important enough to be featured on the municipality's seal. The town hosts the annual Feria Nacional del Queso y el Vino, (National Cheese and Wine Fair) which showcases southern Querétaro's cheese and wine production.

== The town ==
The town of Tequisquiapan in southwestern Querétaro is a tourist town, which mostly caters to weekend visitors from Mexico City and the city of Querétaro. These visitors come to see the parish church, walk the cobblestone streets filled with traditional houses, and visit recreational attractions such as the area's 18-hole golf course and spas/water parks (called “balneários”) such as El Oasis, Thermas del Rey, Fidel Velásquez and La Vega.

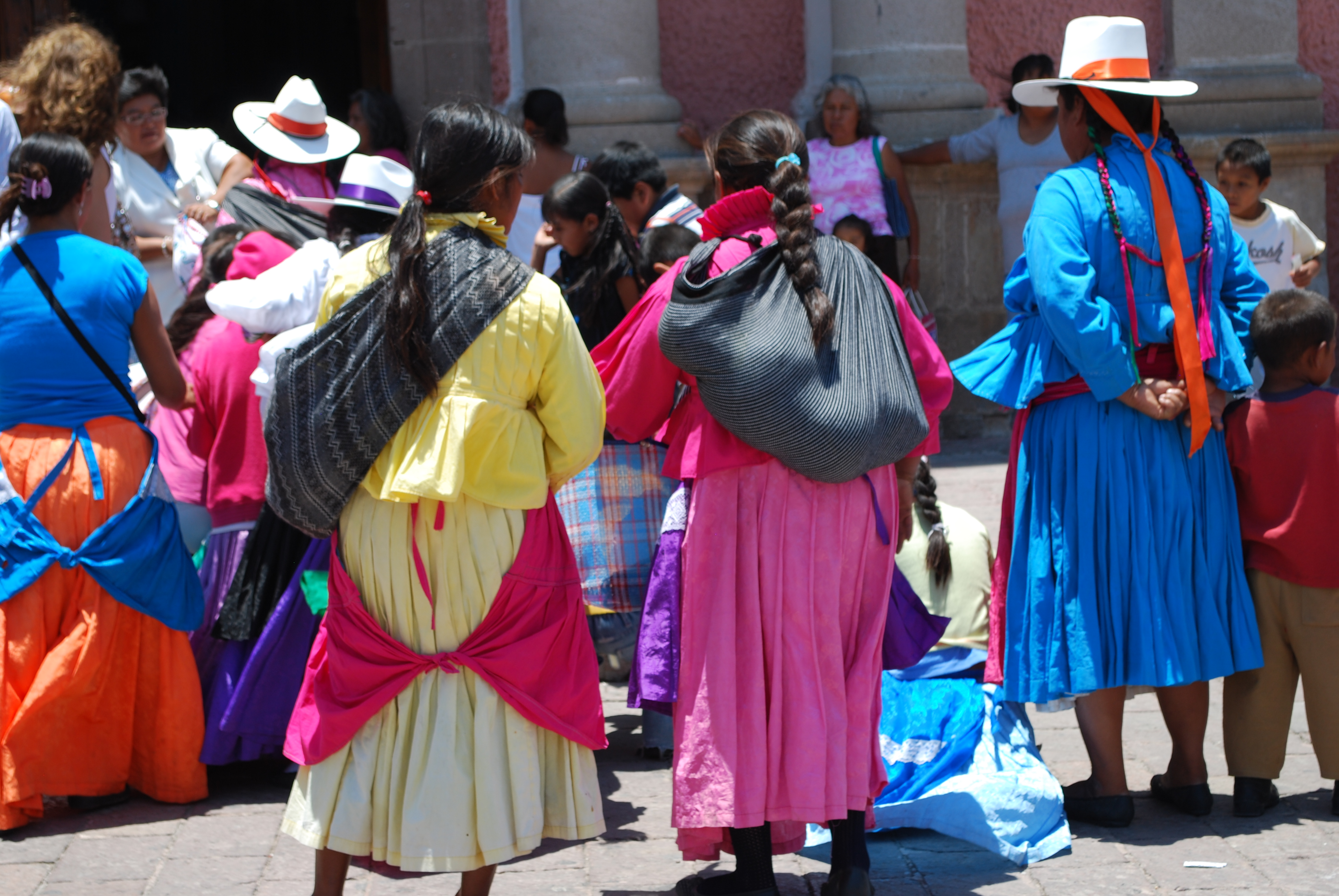
Otomi women at the Main Plaza.

The town is centered on the main square, named after Miguel Hidalgo y Costilla and the Santa María de la Asunción Temple. Hidalgo Square is a large open, paved area, facing which is the town's parish church and a series of arches. On the east side of the plaza, there is a kiosk made of gray sandstone and metal, which often has bands playing live music such as jazz and rock and roll. Along one entire side, there are sandstone arches behind which are a number of business such as galleries, cafés and shops selling sweets, silver, furniture and crafts. It also contains some of the town's better restaurants such as Capricho's, which offers French-Mexican fusion cooking. Another side of the square is taken up by the parish church of Santa María. This church was established in the 16th century, but the current construction is from the 19th century. It is in Neoclassical style with simple lines and made of pink sandstone. The clock in the tower dates from 1897.

Around the main square, much of the construction remains traditional with cobblestone streets and buildings that relatively simple and rustic. This is because this town was dominated by the indigenous for the first three hundred years of its existence. Many of the buildings are two stories tall painted in bright colors such as yellow and green and with balconies. They also have wrought iron fixtures with wooden sills and frames on their doors and windows. Flowerpots are a common sight as well. The narrowness of the roads means that vehicular traffic is commonly jammed, especially on weekends. Efforts at modernization have destroyed many of the town's old trees; however, most of the original junipers along the river remain. Away from the historic center, many of the newer sections of town consist of subdivisions of weekends homes more recently built. However, these mostly follow the architectural styles of the older structures.

The town is home to a number of important legends. As it is a tourist town there is a trolley-replica bus to take visitors around the various landmarks. These landmarks include places where Tequisquiapan's legends are set and on weekends and holidays, actors in period costumes re-enact these stories.

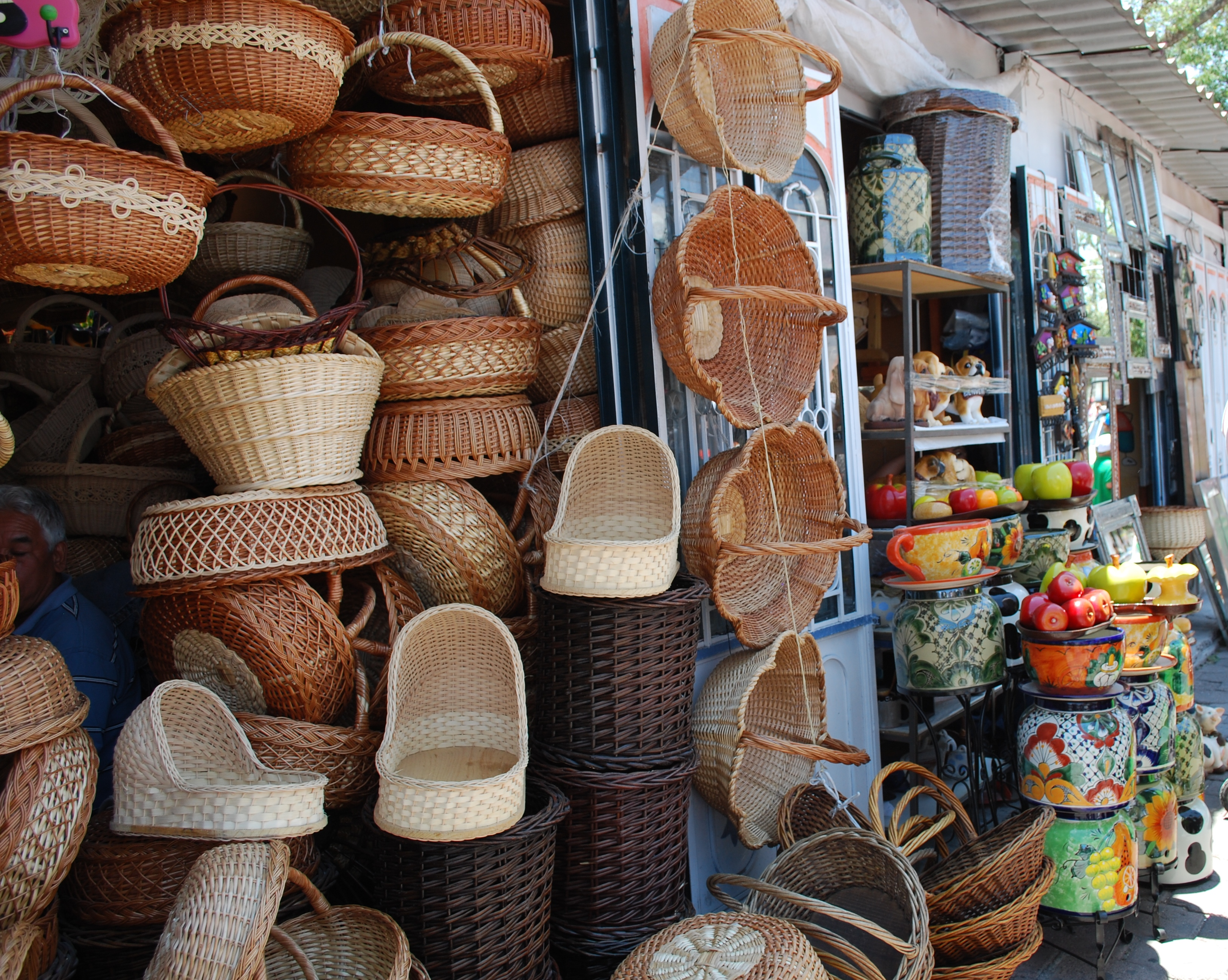
Baskets and other crafts for sale

Another attraction of the town is shopping, especially for handcrafts and folk art. The two most traditional crafts of the area are baskets and furniture made from wood, wicker, rattan and other materials. However, crafts from many parts of Mexico are available for sale as well. The main markets, which are the municipal market and the handcrafts markets are located on Ezequiel Montes Street near Salvador Carrizal. In addition to these markets there are a number of street vendors who sell from stalls or by walking around the streets. One common type of merchandise, especially in the main square are sweet breads, dried fruit, fruits in syrup and other sweets. One unique sweet of the town is crystallized nopal cactus. Otomi women can be seen in the main plaza and other locations selling their crafts. Most of these vendors are from the neighboring municipality of Amealco. These crafts generally consist of embroidered napkins and other textiles, rag dolls, ceramics and baskets.

The most important park in the municipality is La Pila, which is located just north of the main town square. It contains fresh water springs and large areas of trees and grass for picnicking and other activities. The park was the site of an old water mill. Its namesake, a reservoir to store water built in 1567, can still be seen. It is said that there was an indigenous temazcal at the La Pila site. Before it became a park, it was the site of a commercial water park for children. Today, it is an area filled with Montezuma cypress and ash trees and is the site of the annual Feria Nacional del Queso y el Vino. Other parks include El Portón, La Recámara and El Salitrillo.

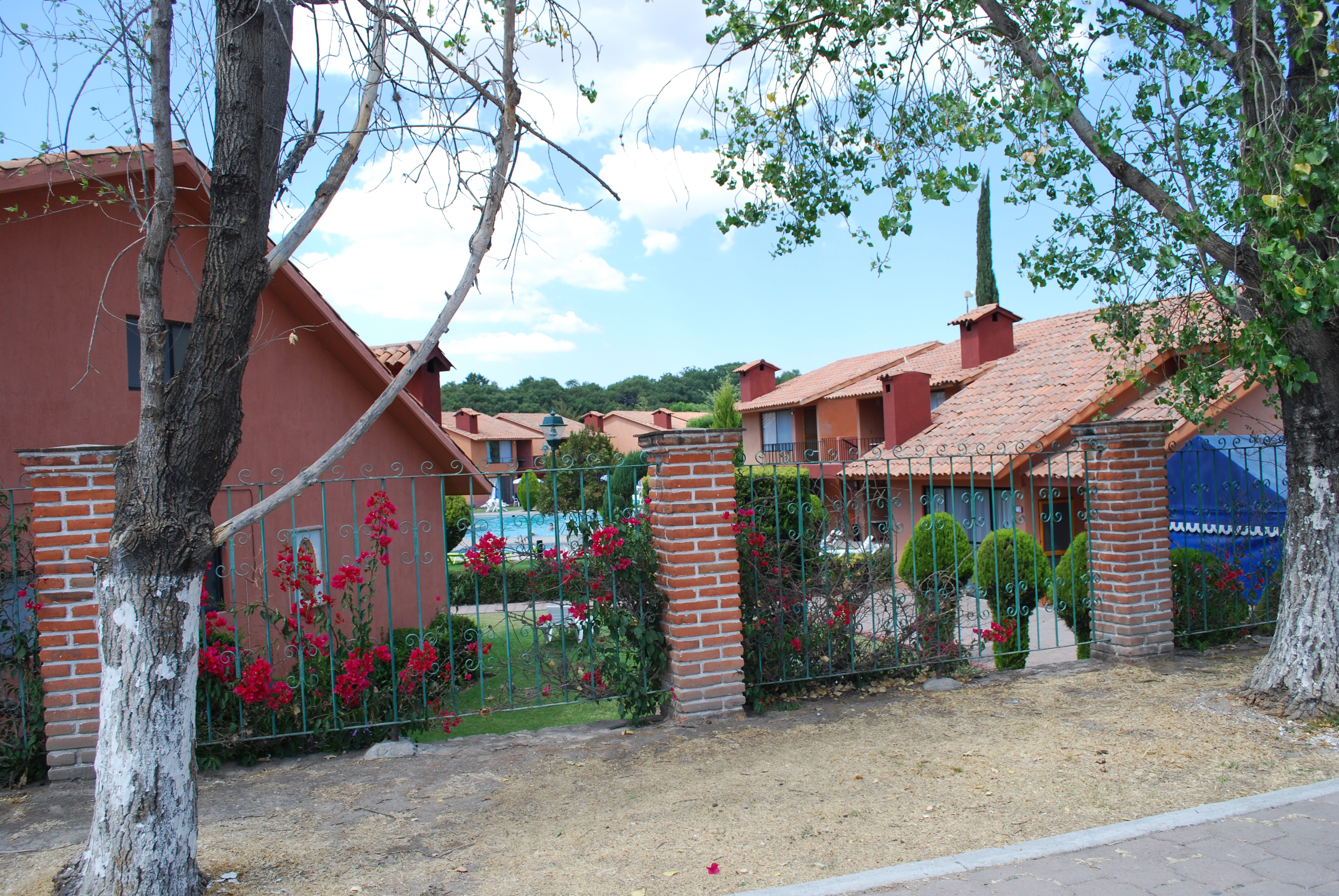
Subdivision of newer homes in the town

The Callejón del Piojo (lit. Louse Alley) is a historic street in the town which was recently renovated to promote fine arts and handcrafts as well as to serve as a venue for cultural and recreational events.

The Centro Cultural or Cultural Center hosts expositions of painting and crafts as well as concerts and workshops. It also has an extensive library.

In the early 20th century, Mexican president Venustiano Carranza passed through Tequisquiapan on his way to the city of Querétaro. He issued a decree announcing that the town was the “geographical center of the country.” However, today that distinction is widely considered to be in Zacatecas. However, there is a monument in the town at Centenario and 5 de Mayo Streets to commemorate the decree.

The two oldest neighborhoods of the town are the Barrio de la Magdalena and San Juan, where many of the chapels built for the indigenous population of the colonial era were built. The main chapel of the Barrio de la Magdalena has a large mesquite tree in its atrium where it is said that the mass celebrated to found the town occurred. This founding is re-enacted here each year in June.

The town contains a bullring which hosts bullfights as well as exhibitions of flamenco dance and concerts. There is a Bullfight Fair in March.

The old Bernal railroad station is located on Avenida Juarez. It was built when the rail line was constructed through the municipality. Today, it served as a viewpoint to see much of the city. It also conserves a locomotive from the beginning of the 20th century.

The Casa de Caballo is located near the river and offers horseback riding in the Barrio de la Magdalena.

Intercity bus service operates out of the town's main terminal, which is served by Flecha azul, Transportes Tequis; Flecha Blanca; Flecha Amarilla; Autotransportes Queretanos and Enlaces Terrestres Nacionales. Two rail lines pass through here connecting Mexico City with Guadalajara and Nuevo Laredo.

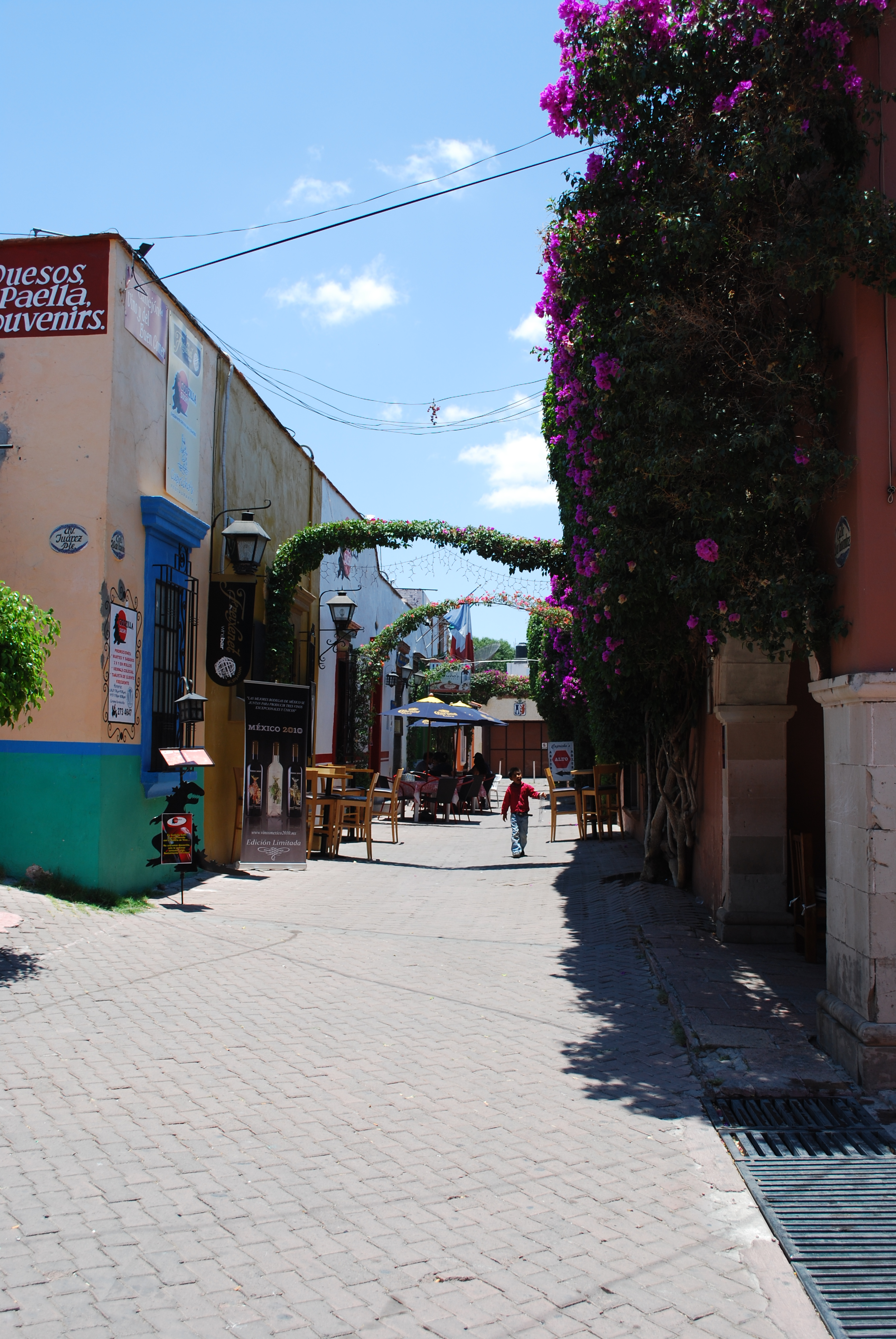
Guillermo Prieto Street, near the main square

The town has a number of festivals and traditions which are especially important or unique to it. The festival of the Holy Cross on May 3 is particularly important in the San Juan neighborhood with the dance of Moors and Christians as the highlight. Preparations for this event begin months in advance.

The feast day for the patroness of the town, Our Lady of the Assumption, occurs on August 15. This day is observed by all in the municipality, many of which come to the parish church in the center of town for the festivities. These festivities include traditional dances, which last from early and through the day. This is also a popular day for confirmations, first communions and other similar ceremonies. The day ends with a large frame called a castillo (castle ) filled with fireworks which is set alight.

For Holy Week, the town holds an annual Passion Play. This event begins in the main square in front of the Santa María de la Asunción Temple and passes through the streets of the town to a site called Monte Calvario, named after the place where Jesus was crucified. Here the crucifixion of Christ is re-enacted. Afterwards, an image of the deceased Jesus is carried from the area in a glass coffin. On Holy Saturday, images of Judas are burned along with those of devils and other disliked figures.

The founding of the town is celebrated each year in the Barrio de la Magdalena neighborhood on June 24, where the founding mass took place. This commemoration includes a re-enactment of the founding with actors in 16th century clothing.

The annual pilgrimage to the chapel on the Cerro Grande occurs on September 13. This procession climbs the hill where the chapel is located the day before and spends the night there. The following day, after mass, there is picnicking and spending the day in the countryside. It is not known how or when this tradition started, but it attracts not only those from Tequisquiapan, but those from Santa Rosa Xajay, El Cerrito, Bordo Blanco and San Nicolás.

The feast of Isidore the Laborer on May 15 is important in the town which is centered on a procession from the Santa María de la Asunción church to the El Llano chapel. The purpose of the feast is to ask for good crops for that growing season. The El Llano chapel is located in the agricultural center of the area.

The feast of Mary Magdalene, patroness of the Barrio de la Magdalena is celebrated on September 8. The feast of the Apostle John, patron of the San Juan neighborhood, takes place on December 27. One Christmas tradition in the town is to have a parade through the town on Christmas Eve. This parade features floats with Biblical scenes.

One local tradition is the creation of “cruces de animas” (crosses of encouragement) which can be seen on family altars or in family shrines. These crosses represent loved ones who have died and can be very elaborate although most are simple. These are most common in the former Indian neighborhoods of San Juan and Barrio de la Magdalena where they can be seen in the local chapels.

== Feria Nacional del Queso y el Vino ==
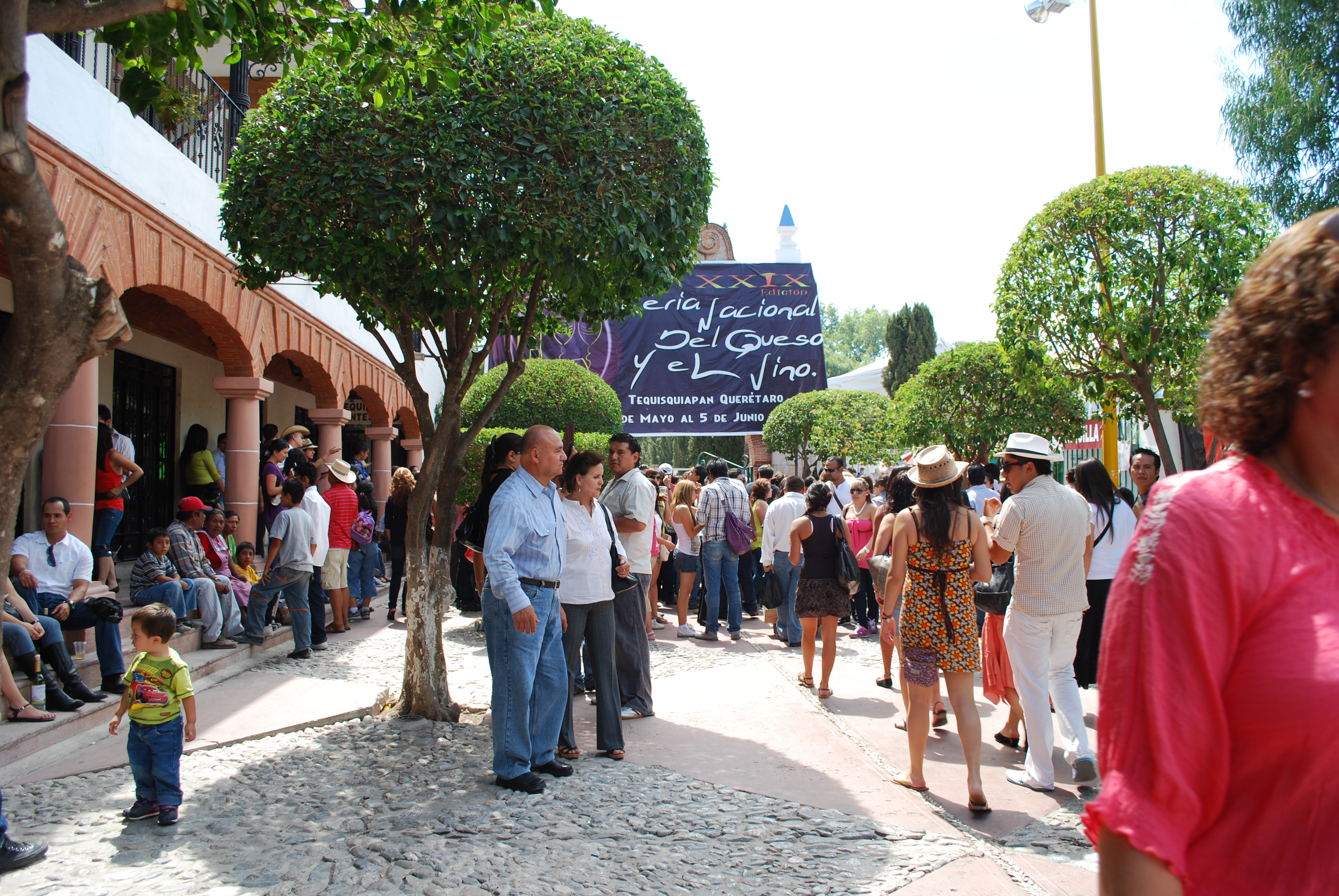
Scene at the Feria

The Feria Nacional del Queso y el Vino began in the 1980s as a means to promote the region's wine and cheese production. The fair promotes the 1,200,000 million bottles of wine and 400,000 kilograms of cheese the state produces each year. Most of the activity occurs at the La Pila Park, in the town center, but there are also cultural events, conferences, contests, charreadas, concerts and more associated with it. The main tent contains wine and cheese producers from the local area as well as the rest of Mexico and international companies. The event crowns a festival queen, who is crowned by the municipal president.

The fair is sponsored with money from the municipality, the state of Querétaro and the federal Secretary of Tourism. Artists who have played at the event include de Paco Rentería, Sonora Dinamita, Playa Limbo, Titanes de Durango, Grupo Mediterráneo, Guitarras de América, Carlos Eduardo Rico, Jorge Falcón, Sandoval, Pambo and singer María José .

The 2011 fair resulted in 100 percent hotel occupancy and an economic impact of forty million pesos for the town. However, the fair has had problems with the uncontrolled sale of alcoholic beverages, which has led to incidents of fighting and other illegal behavior. There have also been cases of alcohol intoxication requiring medical attention.

== The Municipality ==
Extension of the municipality

As municipal seat, the town of Tequisquiapan is the local governing authority for about two hundred other communities, which together cover a territory of 343.6 km. However, over 77% of the population is concentrated in five communities, with about 51% in the town of Tequisquiapan alone. The other major population centers are San Nicolás, La Fuente, Fuentezuelas and El Tejocote. The main economic activity of San Nicolás is the production of cinderblock, followed by agriculture. La Fuente's main economic activity is agriculture with chili peppers, corn, tomatoes and beans as principle crops. La Trinidad is the center of opal mining in the municipality, but it also cultivates corn and beans.

The town and municipality are located in the far southeast of the state of Querétaro, just north of the small industrial city of San Juan del Río, and within one hour driving distance from the city of Querétaro and two hours from Mexico City. This is one reason why it is a popular place to visit on weekends and many second homes have been constructed here. The municipality borders the municipalities of Colón, Ezequiel Montes, San Juan del Río and Pedro Escobedo with the state of Hidalgo to the east. The municipal government consists of a municipal president and thirteen officials called “regidors” to represent the various communities of the municipality.

The overwhelming majority of the population is Catholic, with a small but growing number in Evangelical groups and Jehovah's Witnesses.

There is one special education school which serves 160 students with sixteen teachers. There are sixteen preschools serving over two thousand young children between four and six years of age. There are thirty-six primary schools. Middle school education is offered through two modes, distance education called “telesecundaria” and a general middle school system. Most attend the latter which are located in the larger population centers near the municipal seat. The telesecundarias are located in the communities of La Fuente, Los Cerritos, Fuentezuelas, El Tejocote, San José la Laja, Santillán, El Sauz, La Trinidad and San Nicolás. High school and vocational school education is offered on five sites.

Almost all residences in the municipality are occupied by their owners, with an average of 4.9 occupants per household. Basic municipal services such as running water, garbage and other services are available to 90% or more of the population with the exception of street lighting, which is available to only 60%. Residential construction has changed significantly since the mid 20th century with the introduction of concrete and cinderblock, which is now used in almost all new construction. This is common in Mexico but there is a local variation on roofing which is a vault with a ridgeline in two styles. Constructions dating from before the 1950s are now considered to be “rustic.” These are mostly found in the historic center of Tequisquiapan and a number of the oldest communities in the municipality. New constructions tend to imitate this style.

The main highway for the municipal is Federal Highway 120, which connects it south to San Juan del Río and north to the Sierra Gorda region of Querétaro into Xilitla in San Luis Potosí. Other important roads include State Highway 200 which connects it with Galeras, Huichapan and the city of Querétaro, and State Highway 126, connecting it to Tecozautla. Almost all of the municipality's roads are paved with only 2.3% left as dirt or paved with stone. There are also roads that connect the eighteen communities of the municipalities as well as to the state of Hidalgo.

La Trinidad has an archeological site. The site was excavated in 2009 and 2010 and dates from 750 to 900 CE., around the time of the fall of Teotihuacan. It has been proposed to make it an ecotourism site called Dö Mëkuni. In addition to conserving the areas flora and fauna, it proposes to offer activities such as rappelling, zip-lines, rock climbing, fishing and more, along with a museum dedicated to the archeological site.

The municipality sponsors the annual Rally de Tequisquiapan, which is affiliated with the PAC auto championships. The rally begins in the town and winds its way along the highways of Querétaro in the mountain areas of the state.

== History ==
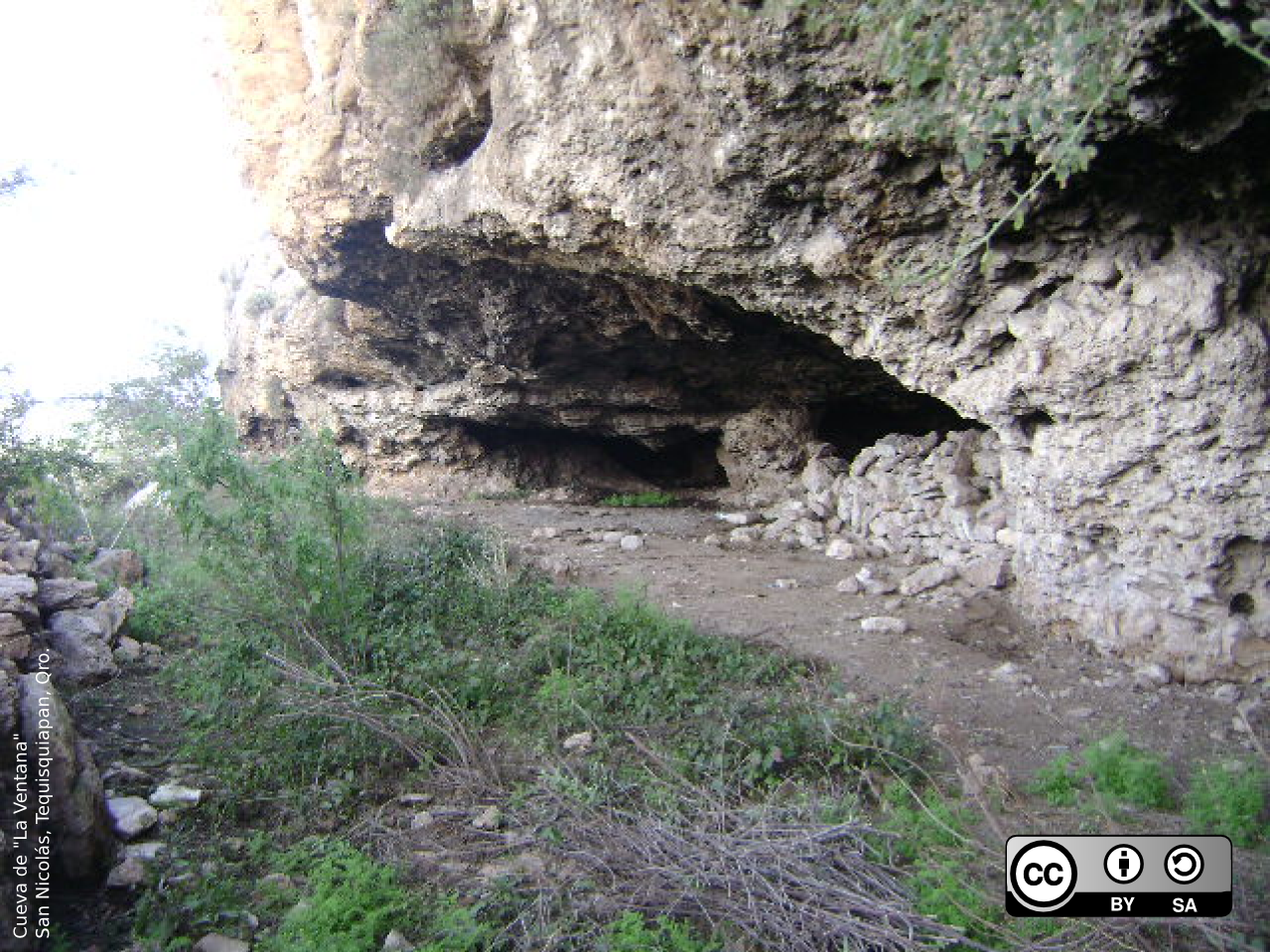
La Ventana cave in San Nicolás

The name comes from Nahuatl and means “place of tequesquite (potassium nitrate)” a type of natural salt used to flavor food since pre Hispanic times. The municipality's seal was adopted in 1989 at a contest held in conjunction with the annual Feria Nacional del Queso y el Vino. This seal contains elements related to the area such as the sun, grapes, the Tequisquiapan River and the parish church of Santa María de la Asunción.

The presence of humans in the modern state of Querétaro is estimated at between 1500 and 2500 BCE, with the oldest human remains found at a cave in the San Nicolás community. This site gives no indication that these early humans had either agriculture or pottery. Much later human remains in the same cave indicate the presence of both and perhaps influence from the Las Ranas site to the north. This would put the area within the sphere of influence of this culture, which was Huastec and part of the early Pre Classic period.

By the Post Classic period, the area was dominated by the Otomi people in the east near the Hidalgo border and by the Chichimeca in the rest. The main Chichimeca settlements were just south and west of the modern municipal seat, where fresh water springs were most abundant and the land was the most fertile. Around this same time, the area had a reputation for its fresh water and thermal springs for medicinal purposes. The area did not have any major cities during the pre Hispanic period but a number of important trade routes ran through it. By the time the Spanish arrived, most of the area was allied with the Otomi at Xilotepec, itself a tributary of the Aztec Empire. The Otomi outnumbered the Chichimecas but both lived in the area peacefully. The area around Tequisquiapan was taken over by the Spanish relatively peacefully, but the Chichimecas did resist. This resistance remained sporadic until the last battle of the Chichimecas in Querétaro against the Spanish called the Battle of Media Luna which occurred to the north in the Sierra Gorda.

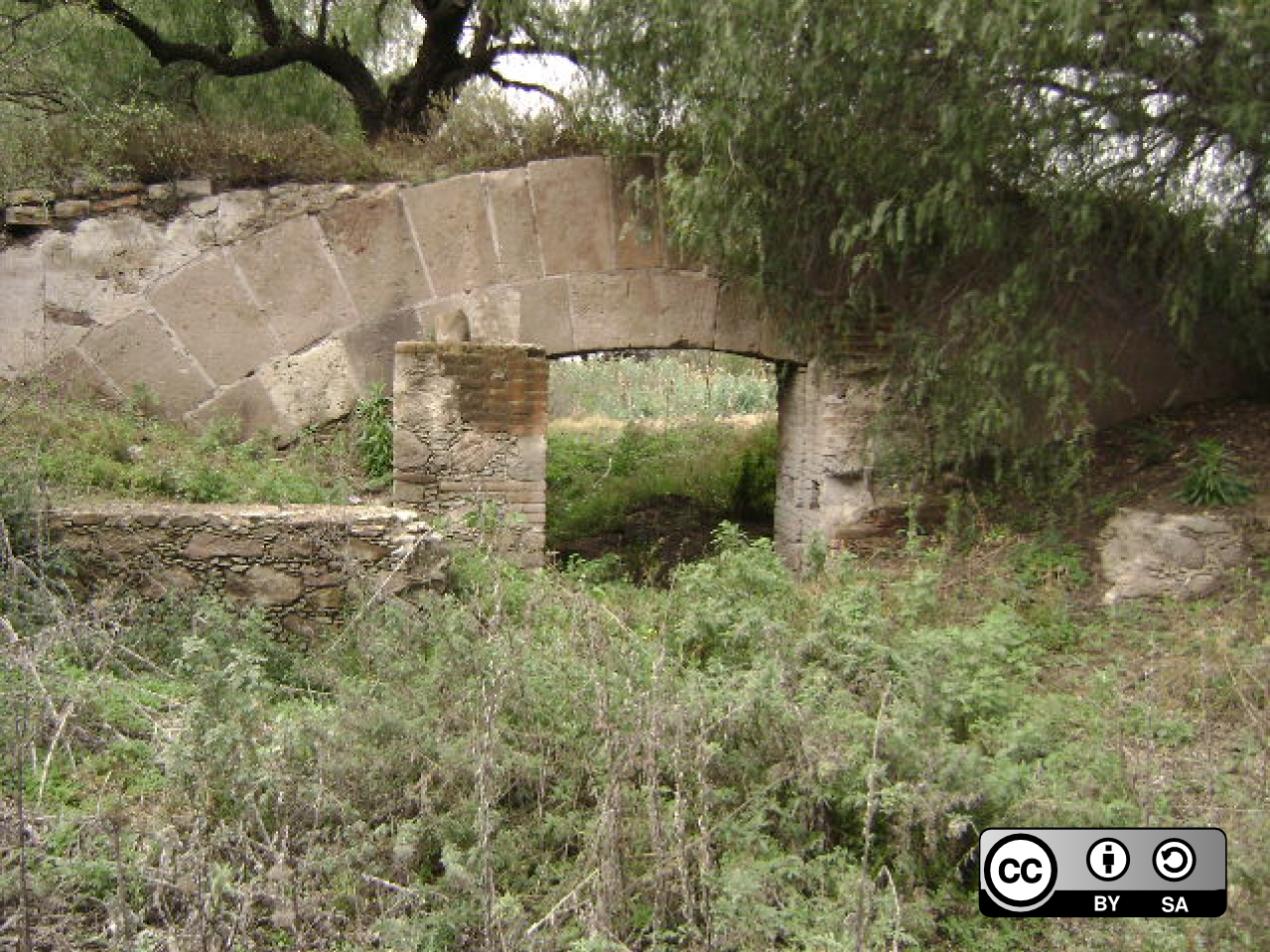
Early colonial era bridge in the San Nicolás community

The official founding date for the city is 1551 by indigenous cacique Nicolás de San Luis Montañez, who was allied with the Spanish. The settlement received its royal seal founded as Santa María de la Asuncón y de las Aguas Calientes. The foundation grouped local Chichimecas and Otomí onto the site and the foundation was celebrated with a Mass. With the pacification of southern Querétaro, lands in the area were redistributed among the Spanish and the evangelized Otomi, leading to three hundred years of intense agricultural development. However, much of this came at the expense of most of the indigenous population. By 1656, it had been definitively named Tequisquiapan.

Despite the exploitation, the population of the town and municipal area remained mostly indigenous. For this reason, the town has kept much of its rustic architecture.

In the decades before the Mexican War of Independence, Tequisquiapan experienced a number of small rebellions on area haciendas, by indigenous people whose socioeconomic status was still serf-like. However, during Independence and other major conflicts of the 19th century, there were no major battles in the area and little information as to how this area was affected. It was officially declared a town in 1861, with the name of Villa de Mateos Tequisquiapan.

During the Mexican Revolution, army loyal to Villa, Carranza and Obregón passed through but no battles were fought in the municipality. However, these armies did sack area haciendas and other locations, mostly for supplies. The Centenario Dam was inaugurated in 1910. Venustiano Carranza visited the thermal springs of the area before heading to the city of Querétaro to sign the 1917 Constitution. This Mexican president also declared the town as the “geographic center of the country.” There is a monument in the town to this effect; however, today the geographic center is considered to be in Zacatecas .

Shortly after the end of the Revolution, there was political instability in the state and Tequisquiapan was designated as the provisional capital in 1920.

Although its first municipal status was gained in 1861, but its current municipal organization was not formalized until 1939.

The growing of grapes in the municipality begin in the early 1960s, with the planting of 120,000 vines for wine grapes in the community of San José Buenavista by the Sofimar enterprise, affiliated with Martelli in France. Initial varieties were ugni blanc (used for brandy), cabernet sauvignon and Grenache, for reds, whites and rosés.

The latter 20th century saw significant population growth, as the town transformed from a small traditional farming village to a popular weekend getaway. This growth has also been spurred by the growth of the nearby industrial city of San Juan del Río. Since 1950, the population of the municipality has grown from 10,877 to 54,929 in 2005. However, the indigenous population has severely decline, from an indigenous majority in the 19th century to only 120 people speaking an indigenous language in the entity as of 2005.

In 2007, the PRD municipal president Noé Zárraga, was shot twice by unknown persons.

== Geography ==
The territory is located in the Mexican Plateau on the southeast side of the Sierra Gorda. The land is relatively flat with rolling hills and small valleys which are mostly farmland. The terrain contains both volcanic and sedimentary rock due to its geological history. The elevations in the area are small with mostly porous rock. In some areas there are quartz and opal deposits. In other areas, there are deposits of rhyolite and pearlite. The highest elevations in the east and are formed by volcanic basalt. This rock varies in color between black and red.

The San Juan/Tequisquiapan River crosses the municipality in the south on which are the Centenario Dam, near the town of Tequisquiapan and the Paso de Tablas Dam near the border with Hidalgo. The latter has an inactive hydroelectric plant. There are subsurface currents of water which feed a number of freshwater springs on either side of the San Juan River. Near the river a number of fruit and nut trees are grown such as walnuts, peaches, pomegranate, avocado, apricots, limes, guavas and fig. There is also vineyards which have not yet reached peak potential.

The main dam for the municipality is the El Centenario Dam, located just south of the town of Tequisquiapan. Although its reservoir is important for water storage, it has had serious problems with pollution from industrial waste. The first major disaster occurred in 1999, when over 2,000 wild ducks died from the contaminated water. A more recent spill, traced to a textile plant in San Juan del Río killed more than 6,000 fish in 2005. This incident also caused health concerns for those living near the water. The area around the dam is subject to flooding during the rainy season, which at times has affected the hotels and restaurants which are nearby. The flooding and contamination problems have had a negative effect on tourism in general.

=== Climate ===
The climate is temperate with two well-defined seasons each year. Most rain falls between June and October, with the dry season extending from November to April. Annual precipitation is 511.8mm. Summers are hot and winters are moderately cold leading to an average annual temperature of 17.5C. The coldest months are October to February, and freezes are not uncommon, occurring an average of 18 days per year. Dominant winds flow from the northeast to the southwest.

=== Flora and fauna ===
Natural vegetation is suited for temperate and relatively dry climates. In the higher elevations, there are forests of low and medium height. In the hotter, dryer lowlands vegetation such as pirul (Schinus molle), mesquite, palo bobo (Tessaria integrifolia), various types of cactus and arid land scrub.

Population growth since the Conquest, and especially in the 20th century has had a negative impact on wildlife in the municipality and other parts of Querétaro. A number of species have already disappeared, such as the jaguarondi and the puma with others in danger of extinction. Species such as deer, coyotes, owls, eagles and foxes have diminished in part due to the contamination of the waters of the Centenario Dam. The most common species of the area are the rabbit, skunk, squirrel, opossum, doves, other species of birds, rattlesnakes and coral snakes.

== Economy ==
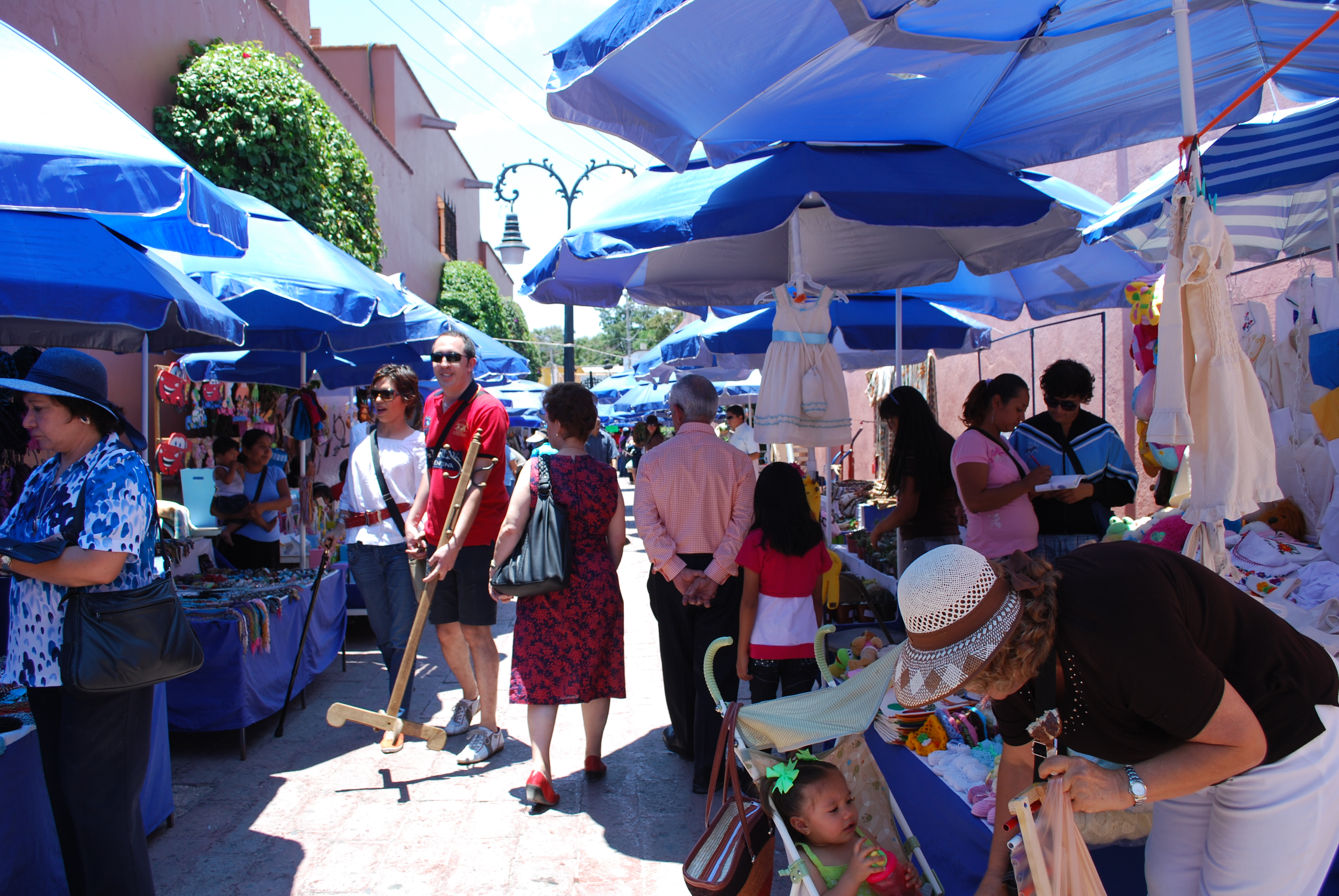
Outdoor crafts market along the parish church

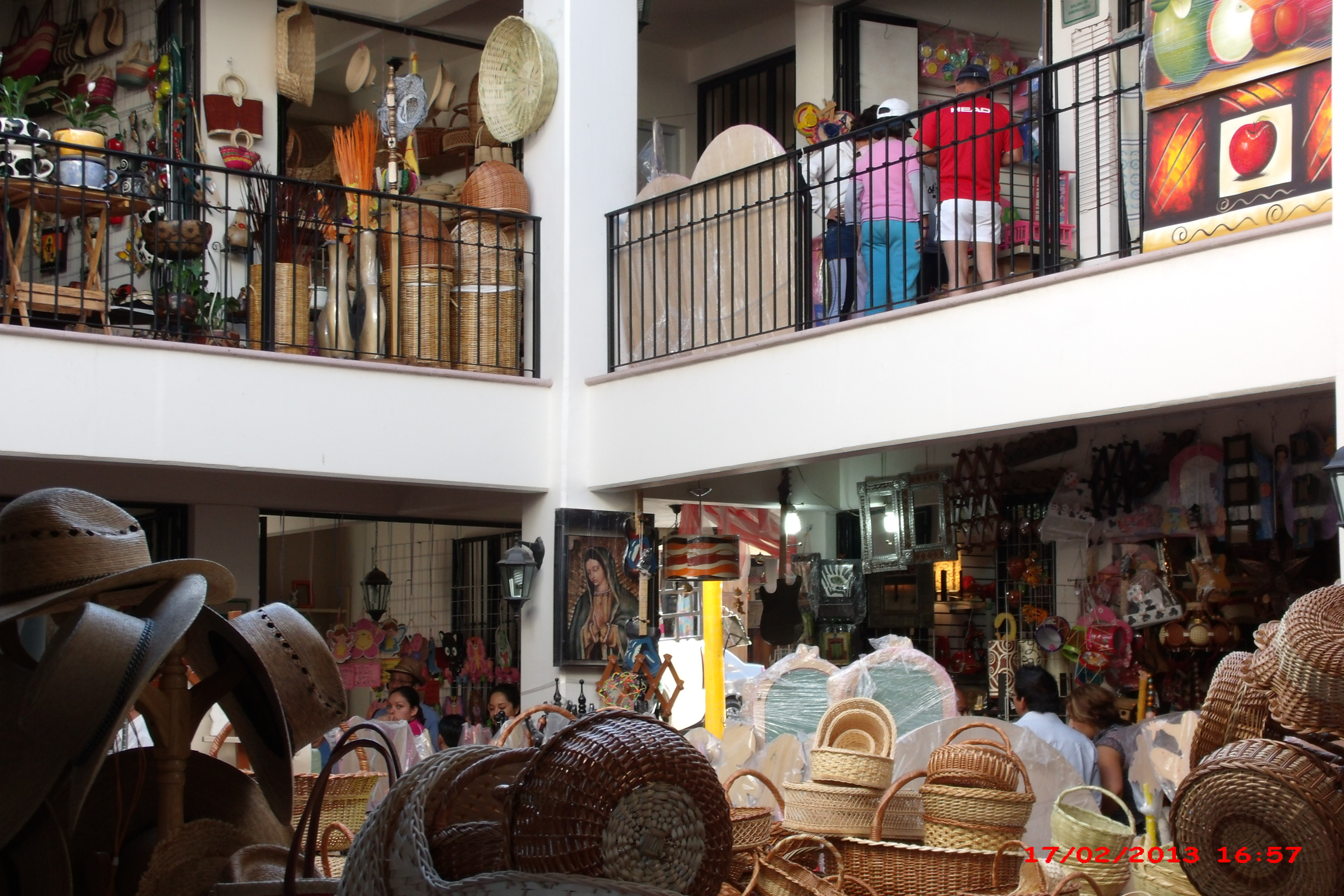
Central Market

After tourism, agriculture and livestock is the most important economic activity of the municipality, employing just under fifteen percent of the working population. This is despite the fact that it is not very profitable due to the high operating costs, obsolete technology, insufficient credit and inadequate commercialization. The main crops are corn, beans, sorghum, alfalfa, grapes, chili peppers, tomatoes and tomatillos. Tequisquiapan is the largest producer of pasilla chili peppers in Mexico, but this production is under pressure due to imports of a similar chili pepper from Peru and China, and sold as pasilla. The municipality is asking for a registration to mark authentic pasilla chili peppers from the imported variety.

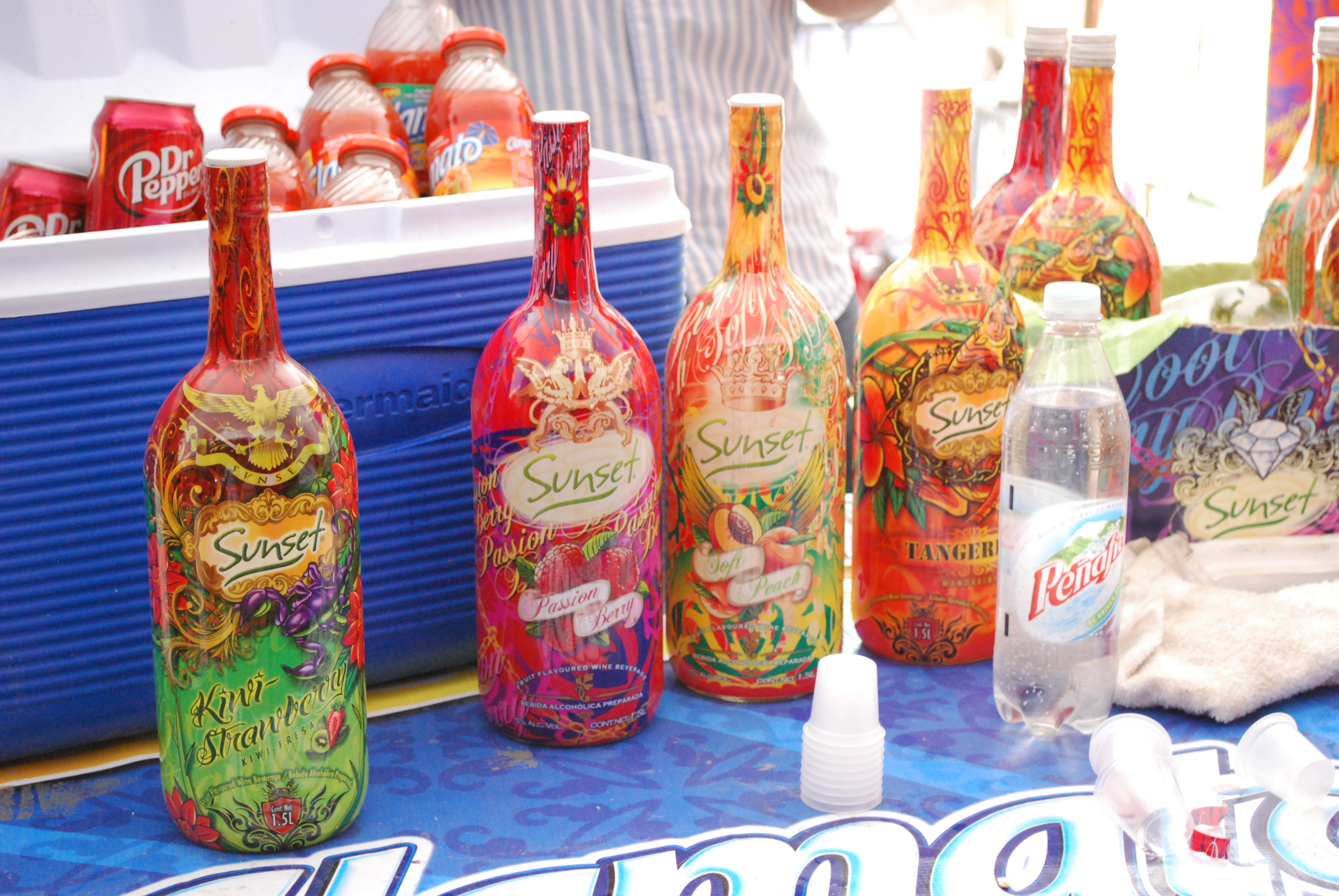
Wine coolers for sale at the Wine Fair

19,703 hectares of the municipality is ejido or other communally owned property. These are owned by thirteen ejidos and one agricultural and livestock cooperative. 11,078 hectares of the municipality are used for agriculture, with 4,867 irrigated and the rest planted during the rainy season.

Livestock mostly consists of the raising of bulls for bullfights. Some of the better known ranches for this include Xajay, La Gloria, San Martín and Fernando de la Mora. Outside of this, the municipality is not especially dependent on the raising of livestock although cattle, pigs, sheep, goats and horses can be found. The town contains a bullring which hosts bullfights as well as exhibitions of flamenco dance and concerts. There is a Bullfight Fair in March.

The growing of grapes in the municipality began with wine grapes in the early 1960s and has grown to be one of the most important agricultural products, featured on Tequisquiapan's municipal seal. Reds, whites and rosés are produced but most are sparkling wines. The major producer in the municipality is Viñedos La Redonda, about twelve km outside of the town proper. The vineyards are mostly planted with vines of French origin such as Merlot, Cabernet Sauvignon and Malbec for reds and Chenin blanc and Trebbiano for whites. It has guided tours for visitors, especially at harvest time. One major producer of table grapes is Rancho San Miguel. The ranch extends over forty hectares and primarily produces Red Globe and Ribier Negra grapes. The ranch also raises 1,200 sheep which helps the ranch maintain an ecological balance through the production of fertilizer. The ranch produces 3,200 crates of the fruit daily during harvest.

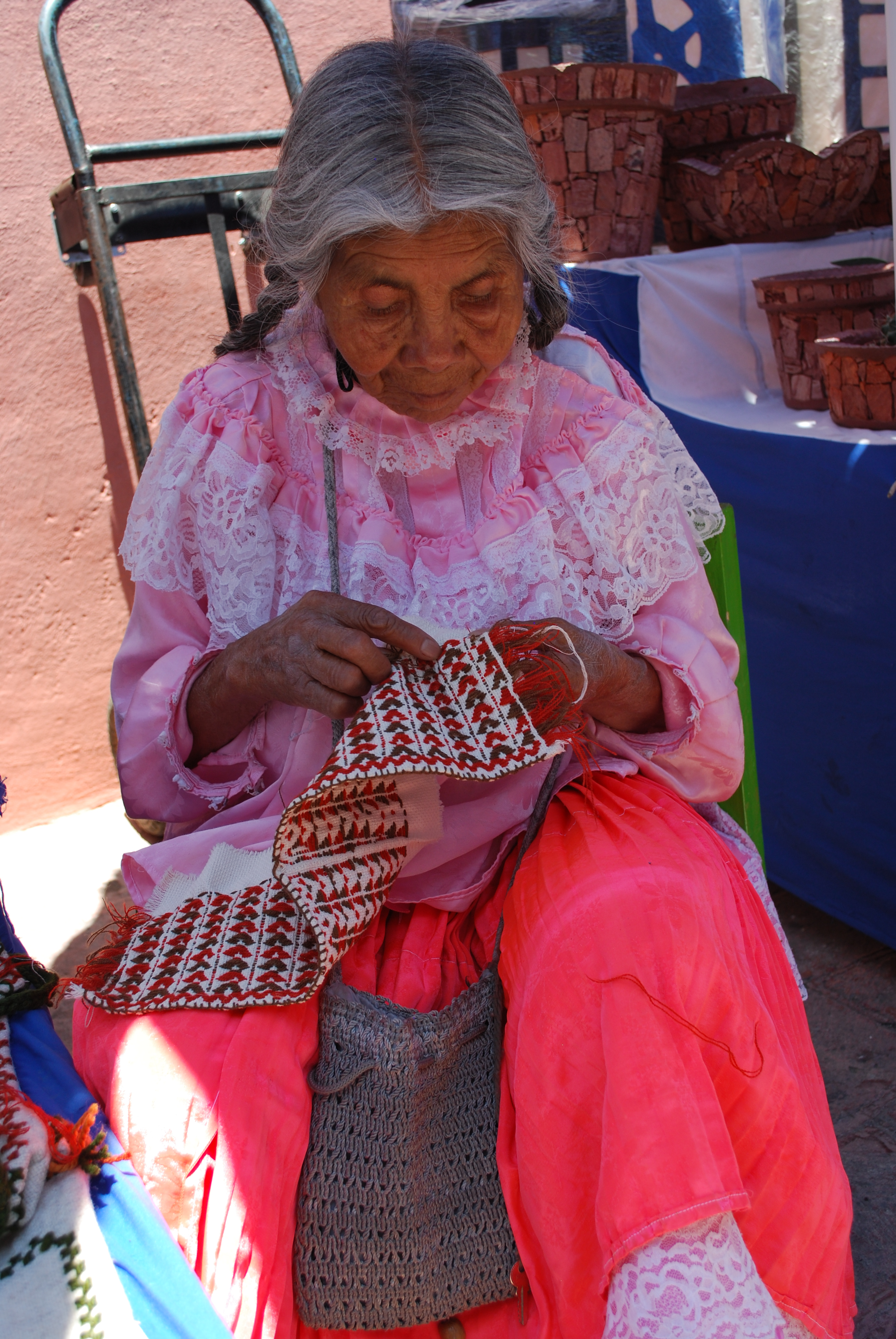
Otomi woman embroidering at one of the crafts markets

Just under fifty percent are employed in industry, construction, and the making of handcrafts. The production and sale of rustic furniture and other handcrafts is an important part of the municipality's economy. Furniture is made with wood, rattan, wicker and willow and pine branches, mostly in colonial or “rustic” style. Basketry is the other traditional craft, mostly woven from willow branches and wicker for household use. The commercialization of these baskets began after the railroad was constructed through here in the early 20th century, with baskets going to Mexico City. Later the train was substituted by buses. The space that baskets would normally take on a transport led to a system of semi construction in the town, with final assembly taking place in the place of sale. The most traditional baskets are still made of willow, but other materials have been adapted such as synthetic, rattan, fabric and more. The town's reputation for handcrafts is part of its attraction for tourism. Tourism has impacted the production of crafts with greater quantity and variety. The most common types to the area are basketry and the making of furniture with willow branches, as well as wood. There are also artisans producing wool items, ceramics, opal items and clothing. There are several textile factories Confecciones San Nicolás S.A. de C.V., Confecciones 1910 S.A. de C.V., Piel GI S.A. de C.V. and Maklo S.A. de C.V.

Quesos Vai is the largest cheese producer in the region, with their main ranch on the Querétaro-Tequisquiapan highway and stores in the town itself. The main cheeses are Oaxaca and manchego, with the latter often containing epazote or chipotle .

Mining is focused on non-metallic minerals with opals and kaolin the most important products. The most important opal deposits are located in the southwest of the municipality in small mountain chain near the community of La Trinidad. The most productive mines include El Iris, La Carbonera, La Esperanza and El Rendón producing gems of size, quality and a variety of colors. Most kaolin deposits are found in northeast near the communities of El Sombrerete and Los Charcos. La Carbonera is an opal mine open to the public. Tours include miners telling stories about mining in the area and visitors are encouraged to look for the stones.

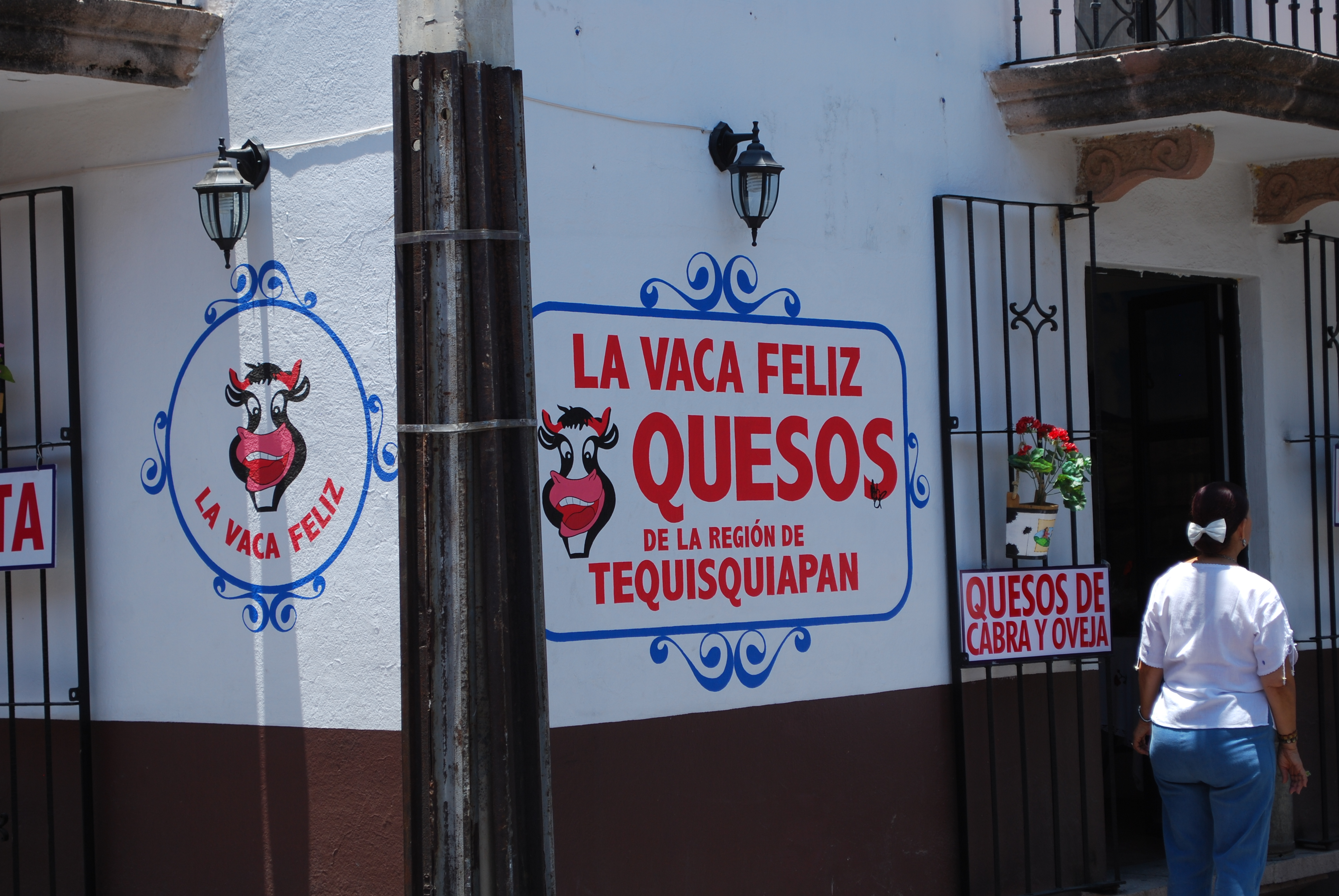
Specialty cheese shop in the town

Just over thirty three percent are employed in commerce and services, including tourism. The tourism and service sector of the town employs about four hundred people directly, along with 200 more during the busy seasons and 450 jobs indirectly depend on it. The municipality has forty one hotels and thirty eight large restaurants. Retail commercial establishment include those catering to tourists and those catering to the local population. The municipality contains one wholesale food market, a crafts market, an open-air market for crafts, three warehouses for grain and over 2100 small retail businesses. The main market for groceries remains the municipal market.

Tequisquiapan is the second most important tourist destination in the state of Querétaro. The major tourist attractions for the town and municipality include the food, the hot springs, the crafts and the climate. It has had a reputation as a place to visit for its thermal and fresh water springs since the pre Hispanic era. However, many of these springs have dried up due to the pumping of groundwater, requiring spas and hotels to pump the spring and thermal water from below ground as well. Today, other attractions of the town include its climate, the layout of its streets, the traditional facades of its houses and the variety of handcrafts and folk art available in its markets. Spas and water parks include Balneario La Vega, Parque Acuático El Oasis, Parque Acuático Termas del Rey, Fantasía Acuática and Balneario San Joaquín. Some of the water parks feature thermal springs and other have water slides and other rides for children.

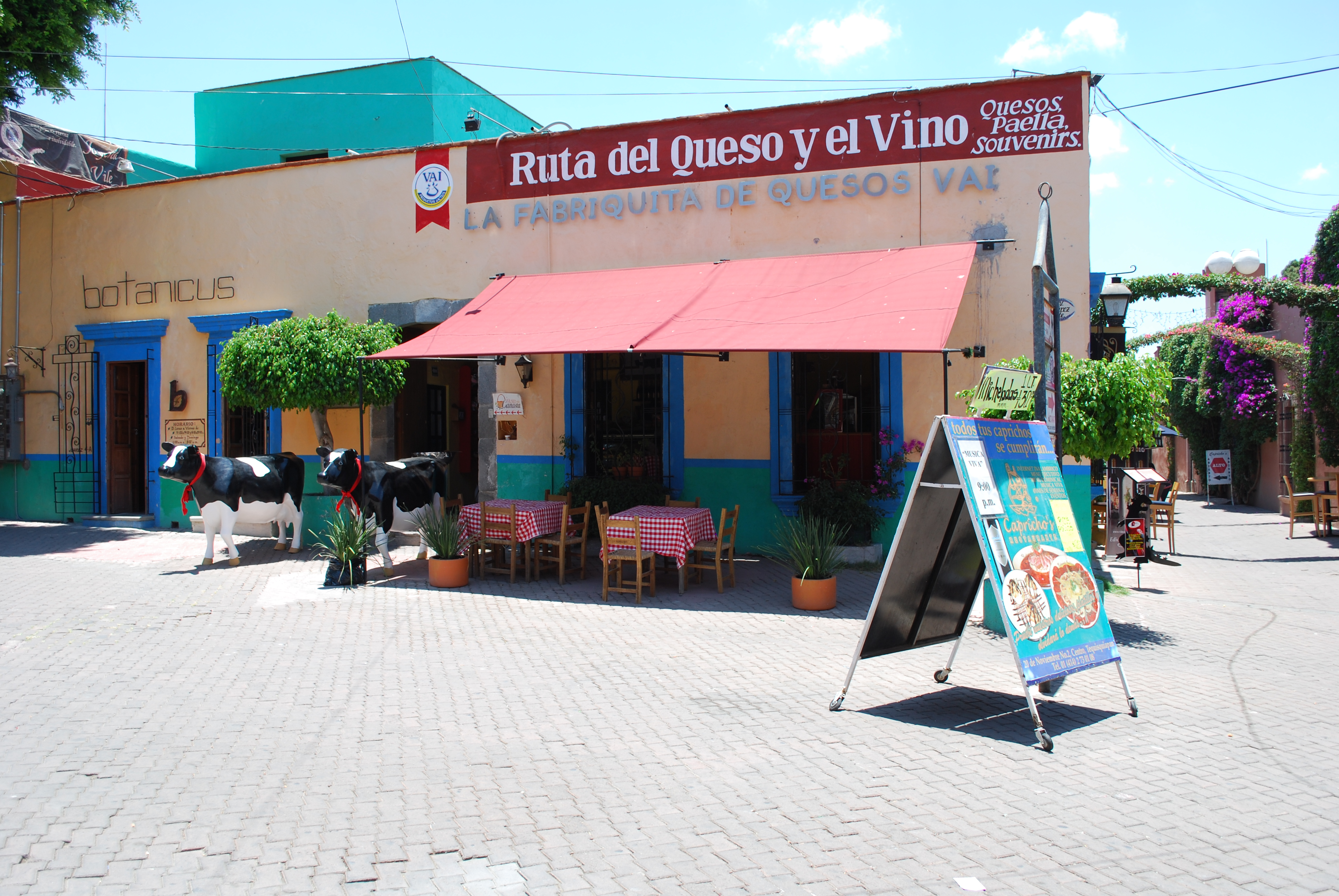
Quesos Vai wine and cheese shop

The town is part of the Ruta de Vino (Wine Route), a tourist route dedicated to the state's wine and cheese production as well as the Peña de Bernal.

Hotels range from the inexpensive to five star accommodations. The town contains twenty nine hotels with a total of 792 rooms. Restaurants have increased in number and size as tourism grows, offering national and international cuisine. However, economical eateries including those in the Santa Cecilia tianguis market are still readily available. The cuisine of the area maintains is pre Hispanic base of corn, nopal cactus and chili peppers. Typical dishes in the municipality include barbacoa made from goat, menudo, a type of blood pudding, mole Querétaro style, rice with the viscera of chicken or turkey, quesadillas with squash flowers or huitlacoche, carnitas, tamales and gorditas. Bread is an important staple as well, where bakeries such as La Charamusca sometimes have lines of people waiting to buy sweet bread and cookies. Beverages include atole, pulque and aguardiente (a liquor made from sugar cane from the Sierra Gorda region). Although there is wine production here, it is generally not consumed by the local populace.

There are hot air balloon flights for tourists, conducted by the Club Aerostático Nacional. Balloon rides are offered only in the mornings due to wind speed.

Despite its long history of being a place to visit for its hot springs and proximity to Mexico City, hotel occupancy is only around twenty to twenty five percent during the year. One reason for this is that many of the visitors stay for only a day or weekend. Most visitors to the municipality are from Mexico City and the city of Querétaro, as these are within easy driving distance of the town for weekend visits. The municipality tried to gain a line of credit with the government finance agency Banobras in order to improve the area's tourism infrastructure.

== Notable person ==
- Kajsa Rothman, first Swedish volunteer in the Spanish Civil War, fled to Mexico after the Nationalist victory and settled in Tequisquiapan, opened a bar with another woman and ran a school for the children of Indigenous people
