= Ezequiel Montes Municipality =

Ezequiel Montes
- Municipality
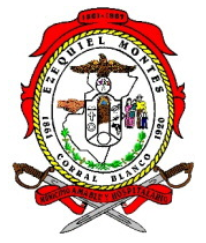
- Coat of arms

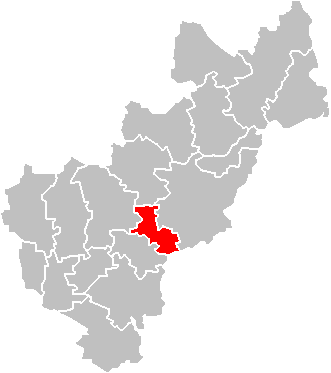
- Location of the municipality in Querétaro
- Coordinates: 20°40′N 99°54′W
- Country: Mexico
- State: Querétaro
- Municipal seat: Ezequiel Montes
- Time zone: UTC-6 (Central)

Ezequiel Montes is a municipality in the central Mexican state of Querétaro. The municipal seat is at Ezequiel Montes.
