= Municipalities of Querétaro =

List of municipalities of Mexican state

Map of Mexico with Querétaro highlighted

Querétaro is a state in central Mexico, divided into 18 municipalities. According to the 2020 INEGI census, it is the twenty-first most populated state out of thirty-two with 2,368,467 inhabitants and the sixth smallest by land area spanning 11,690.6 square kilometres (4,513.8 sq mi). The largest municipality by population is Querétaro, with 1,049,777 residents (44.32% of the state's total), while the smallest is San Joaquín with 8,359 residents. The largest municipality by land area is Cadereyta de Montes, with an area of 1,347.40 km^{2} (520.23 sq mi), and the smallest is Corregidora with 234.90 km^{2} (90.70 sq mi). The newest municipalities are Ezequiel Montes, Pedro Escobedo and San Joaquín, established in 1941.

Municipalities in Querétaro are administratively autonomous of the state government according to the 115th article of the 1917 Constitution of Mexico. Every three years, citizens elect a municipal president (Spanish: presidente municipal) by a plurality voting system who heads a concurrently elected municipal council (ayuntamiento) responsible for providing all the public services for their constituents. The municipal council consists of a variable number of trustees and councillors (regidores y síndicos). Municipalities are responsible for public services (such as water and sewerage), street lighting, public safety, traffic, and the maintenance of public parks, gardens and cemeteries. They may also assist the state and federal governments in education, emergency fire and medical services, environmental protection and maintenance of monuments and historical landmarks. Since 1984, they have had the power to collect property taxes and user fees, although more funds are obtained from the state and federal governments than from their own income.

== Municipalities ==
Largest municipalities in Querétaro by population

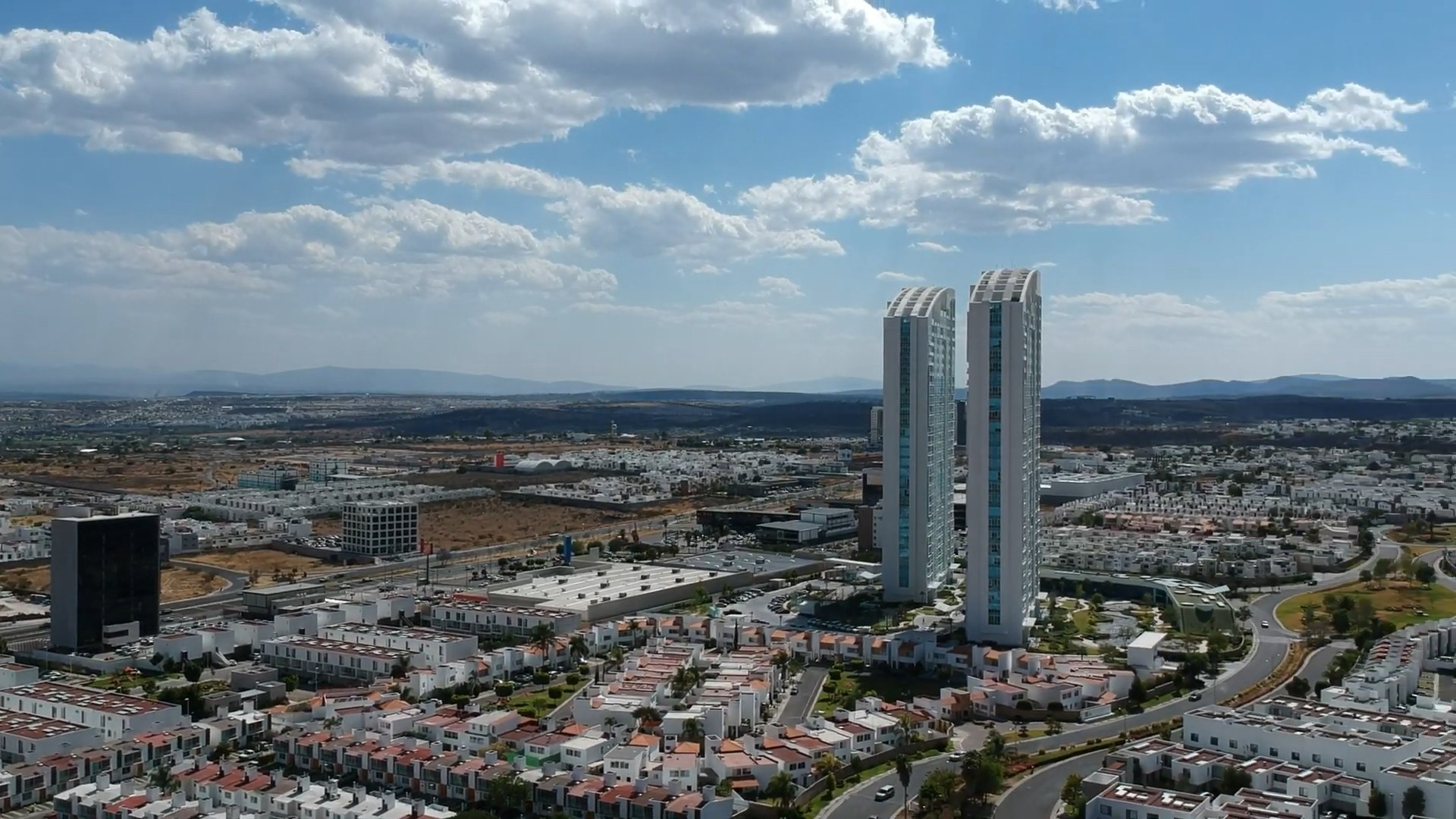
Quéretaro, whose seat is the capital of the state, is the largest municipality by population in Querétaro.

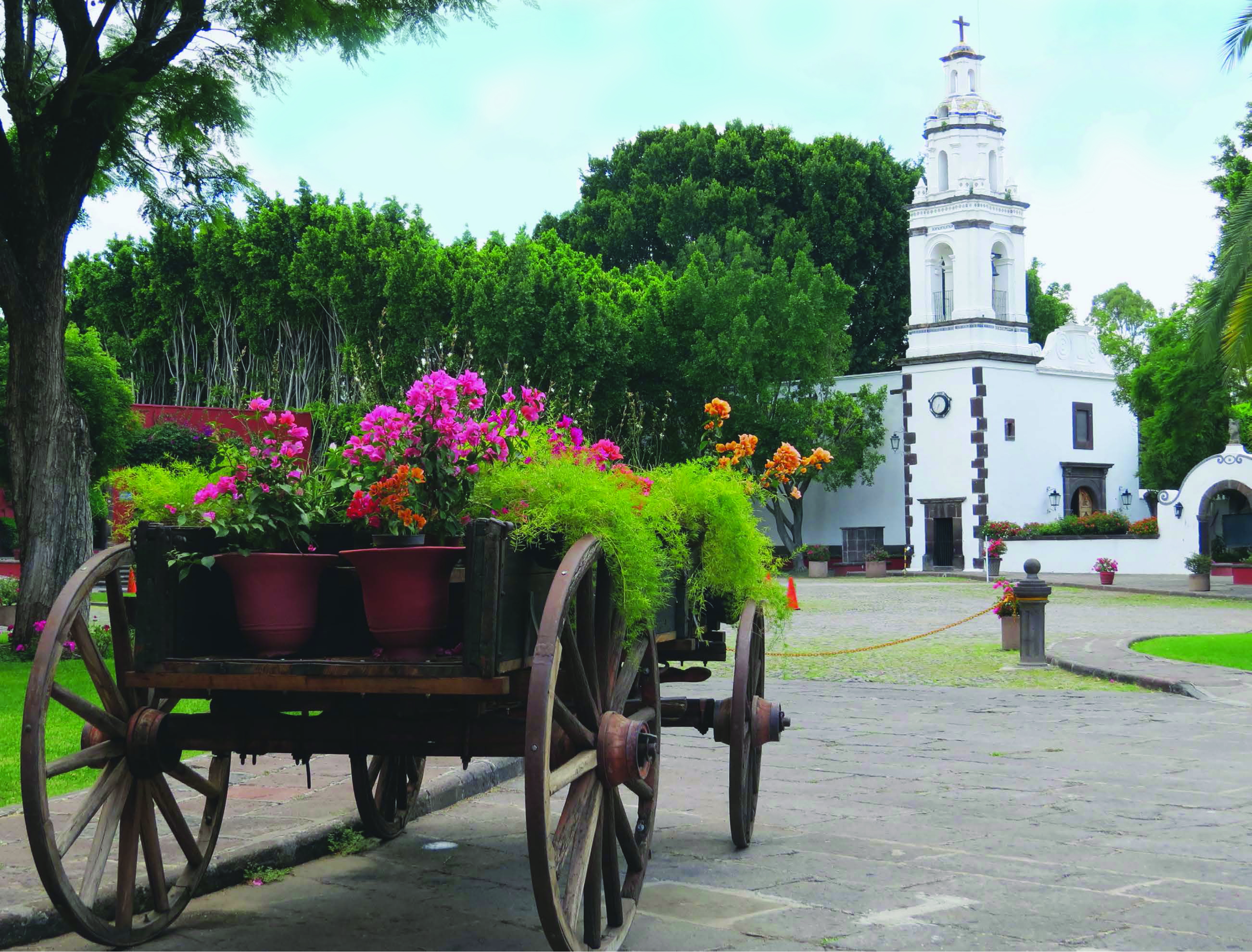
San Juan del Río, the second largest municipality by population

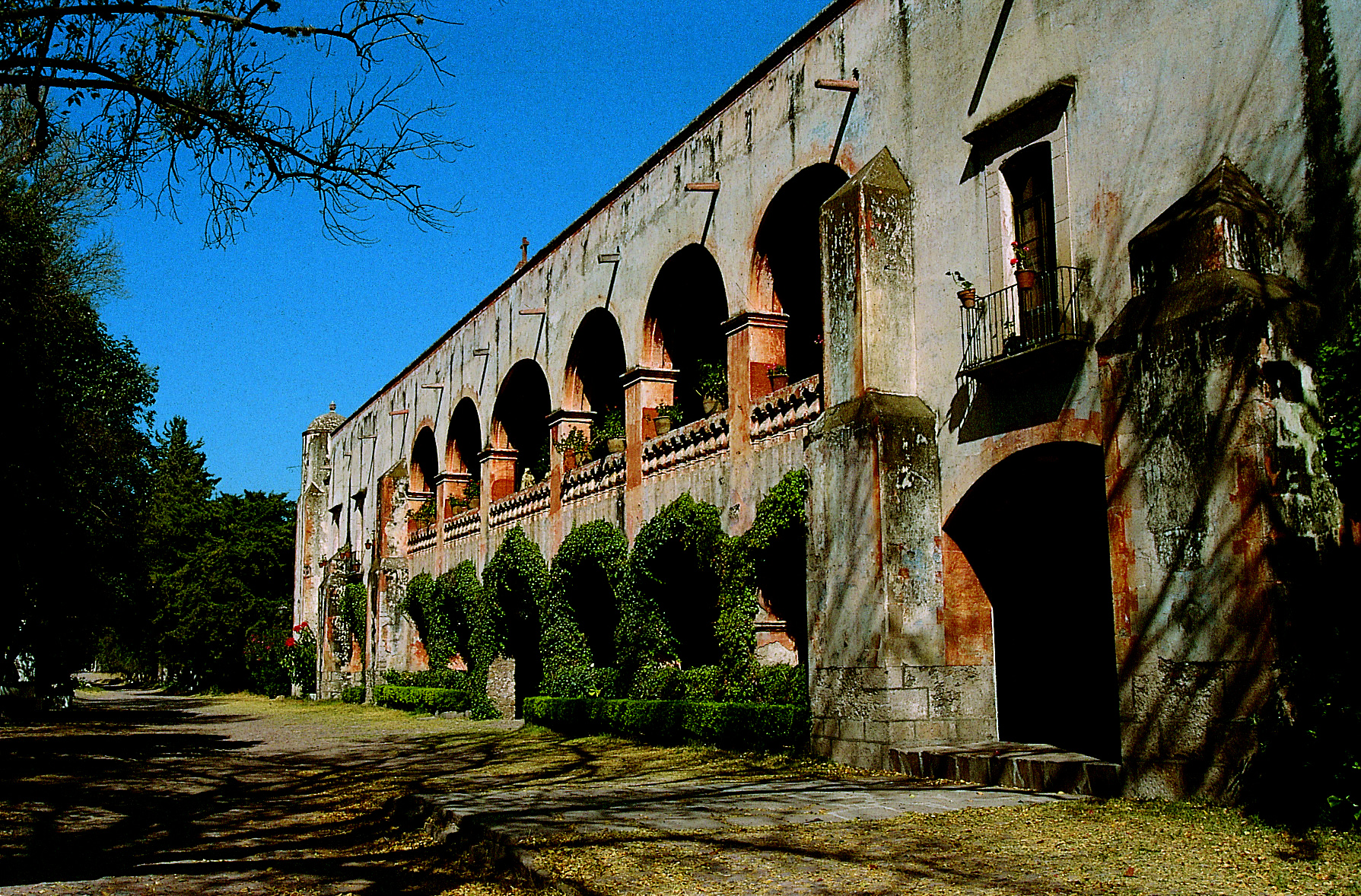
El Marqués, a suburb of the capital city, is the fastest growing and third largest municipality by population in Querétaro.

† State capital

Municipalities of Querétaro
Name	Municipal seat	Population (2020)	Population (2010)	Change	Land area		Population density (2020)	Incorporation date
Name	Municipal seat	Population (2020)	Population (2010)	Change	km^{2}	sq mi	Population density (2020)	Incorporation date
Amealco de Bonfil	Amealco de Bonfil	66,841	62,197	+7.5%	713.3	275.4	93.7/km^{2} (242.7/sq mi)	August 12, 1825
Arroyo Seco	Arroyo Seco	13,142	12,910	+1.8%	732.1	282.7	18.0/km^{2} (46.5/sq mi)	August 12, 1825
Cadereyta de Montes	Cadereyta	69,075	64,183	+7.6%	1,347.4	520.2	51.3/km^{2} (132.8/sq mi)	August 22, 1823
Colón	Colón	67,121	58,171	+15.4%	810.3	312.9	82.8/km^{2} (214.5/sq mi)	June 23, 1882
Corregidora (Note: Corregidora was originally incorporated as San Francisco Galileo, changing its name on May 28, 1931.)	El Pueblito	212,567	143,073	+48.6%	234.9	90.7	904.9/km^{2} (2,343.7/sq mi)	August 12, 1825
El Marqués (Note: El Marqués was originally incorporated as San Pedro de la Cañada, changing its name on May 28, 1931.)	La Cañada	231,668	116,458	+98.9%	747.6	288.6	309.9/km^{2} (802.6/sq mi)	August 12, 1825
Ezequiel Montes	Ezequiel Montes	45,141	38,123	+18.4%	300.2	115.9	150.4/km^{2} (389.5/sq mi)	April 24, 1941
Huimilpan	Huimilpan	36,808	35,554	+3.5%	388.1	149.8	94.8/km^{2} (245.6/sq mi)	August 12, 1825
Jalpan	Jalpan de Serra	27,343	25,550	+7.0%	1,186.2	458.0	23.1/km^{2} (59.7/sq mi)	August 12, 1825
Landa	Landa de Matamoros	18,794	19,929	−5.7%	719.4	277.8	26.1/km^{2} (67.7/sq mi)	August 12, 1825
Pedro Escobedo	Pedro Escobedo	77,404	63,966	+21.0%	323.2	124.8	239.5/km^{2} (620.3/sq mi)	April 24, 1941
Peñamiller (Note: Peñamiller was originally incorporated as Santa María Peñamillera, changing its name on April 24, 1941.)	Peñamiller	19,141	18,441	+3.8%	695.0	268.3	27.5/km^{2} (71.3/sq mi)	August 12, 1825
Pinal de Amoles (Note: Pinal de Amoles was originally incorporated as San José de los Amoles, changing its name on January 7, 1932.)	Pinal de Amoles	27,365	27,093	+1.0%	712.1	274.9	38.4/km^{2} (99.5/sq mi)	August 12, 1825
Querétaro	Santiago de Querétaro†	1,049,777	801,940	+30.9%	682.7	263.6	1,537.7/km^{2} (3,982.6/sq mi)	August 22, 1823
San Joaquín	San Joaquín	8,359	8,865	−5.7%	276.8	106.9	30.2/km^{2} (78.2/sq mi)	April 24, 1941
San Juan del Río	San Juan del Río	297,804	241,699	+23.2%	770.9	297.6	386.3/km^{2} (1,000.5/sq mi)	August 22, 1823
Tequisquiapan	Tequisquiapan	72,201	63,413	+13.9%	369.6	142.7	195.3/km^{2} (506.0/sq mi)	August 12, 1825
Tolimán (Note: Tolimán was originally incorporated as San Pedro Tolimán, changing its name on September 16, 1917.)	Tolimán	27,916	26,372	+5.9%	680.7	262.8	41.0/km^{2} (106.2/sq mi)	August 12, 1825
Querétaro	—	2,368,467	1,827,937	+29.6%	11,690.6	4,513.8	202.6/km^{2} (524.7/sq mi)	—
Mexico	—	126,014,024	112,336,538	+12.2%	1,960,646.7	757,010	64.3/km^{2} (166.5/sq mi)	—
