= Pinal de Amoles Municipality =

Pinal de Amoles
- Municipality
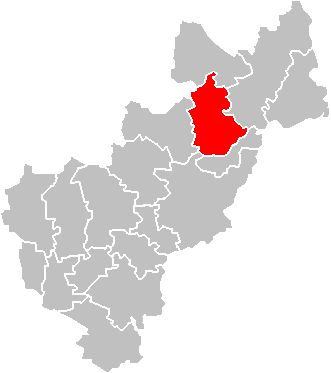
- Location of the municipality in Querétaro
- Coordinates: 21.1342°N 99.4586°W
- Country: Mexico
- State: Querétaro
- Municipal seat: Pinal de Amoles
- Time zone: UTC-6 (Central)

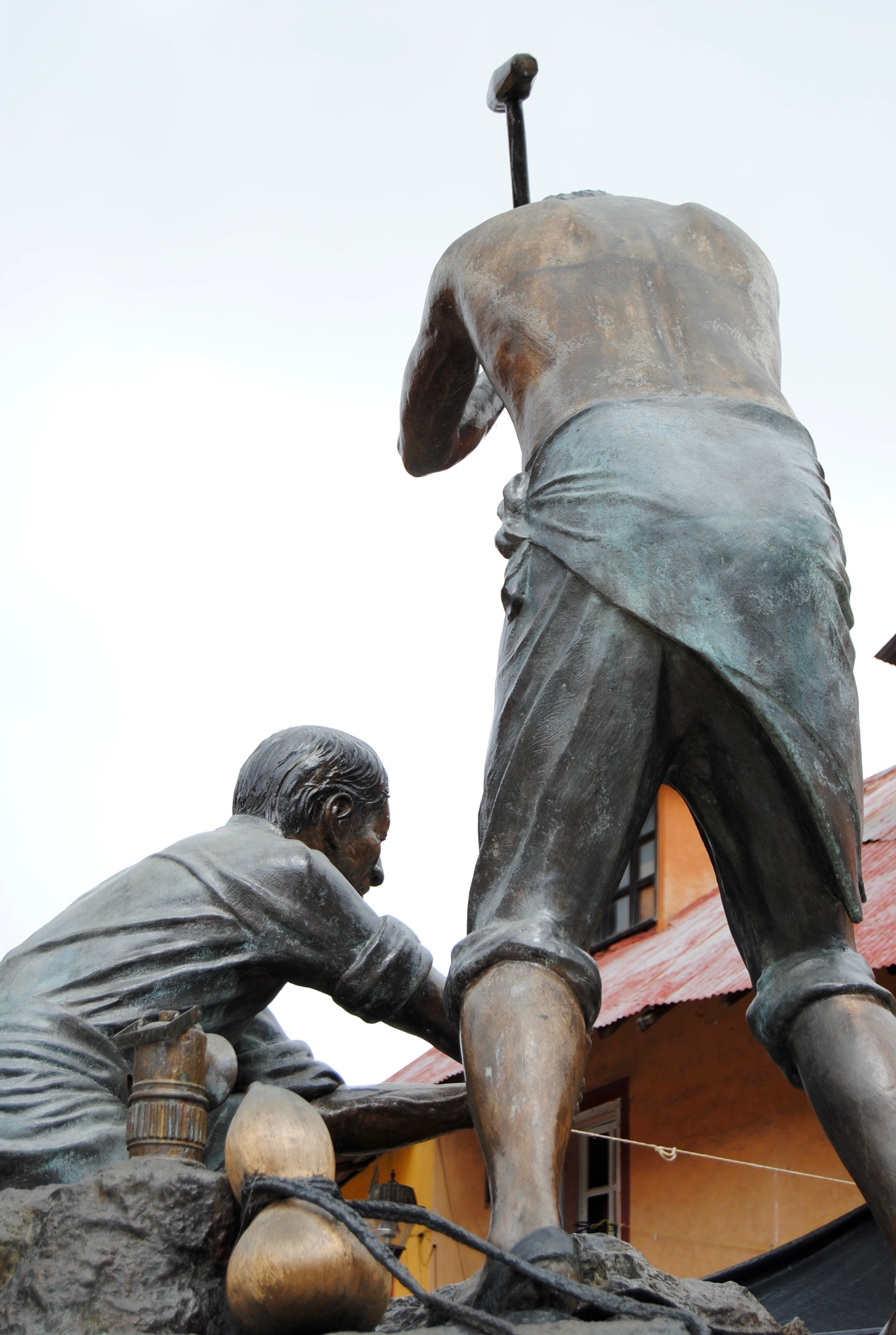

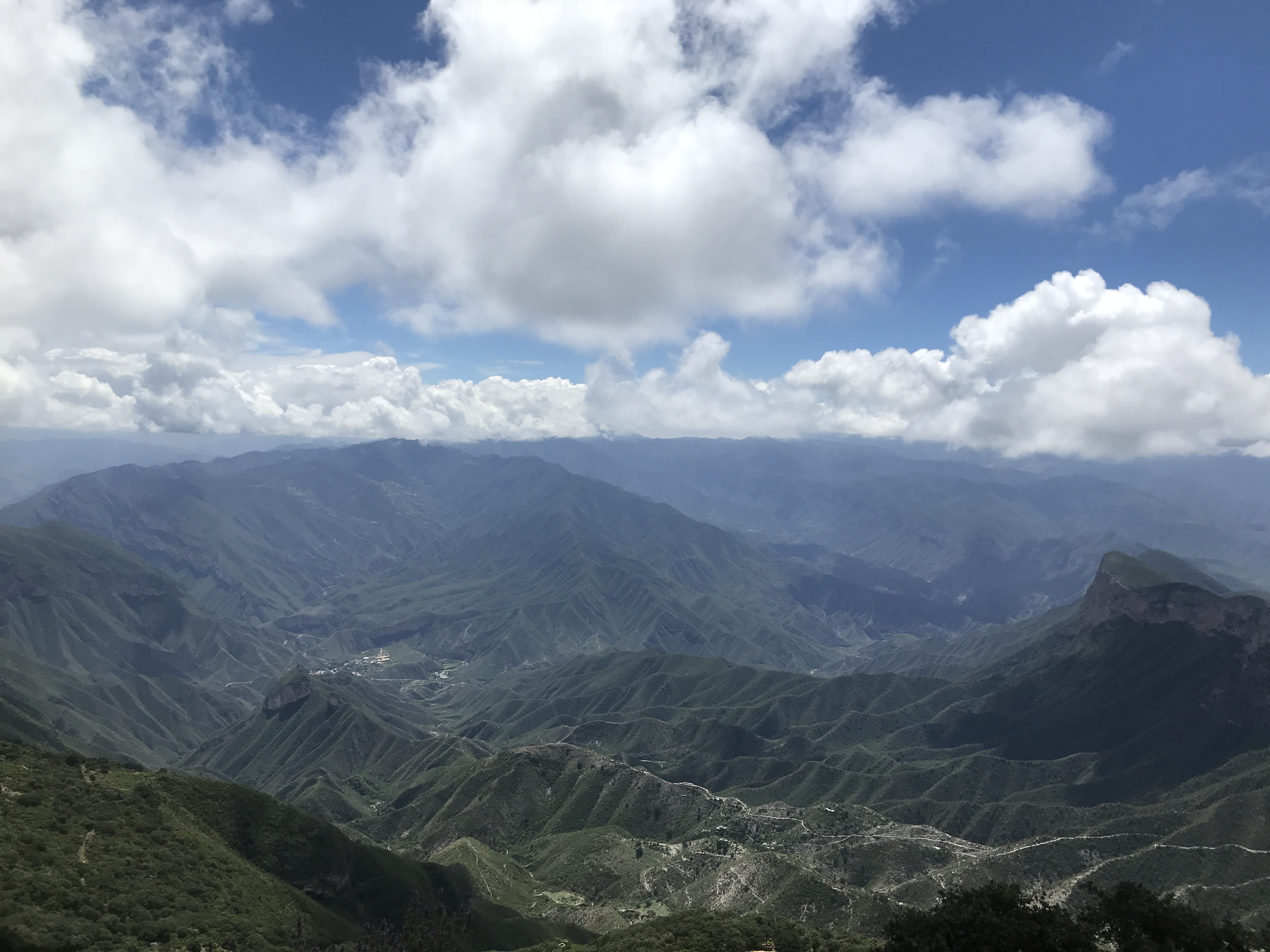
Panoramic view of the viewpoint "Cuatro Palos"

Pinal de Amoles is a municipality in the central Mexican state of Querétaro.

The seat is Pinal de Amoles.

The municipality has a total 198 communities which together make up a territory of 705.3698 km^{2}. The most important of these are Pinal de Amoles, Ahuacatlán de Guadalupe, San Pedro el Viejo, Santa Águeda, San Pedro Escanela and Bucareli. The municipality's government is formed by a municipal president, and nine officials called “regidors”. The municipality borders the municipalities of Arroyo Seco, San Joaquín, Cadereyta de Montes, Jalpan de Serra and Peñamiller with the state of Guanajuato on the west. The municipality has no indigenous communities and only 42 people who could speak an indigenous language as of 2005. Population growth from 2000 to 2005 was 0.26%. Of a total of 198 communities in the municipality, 72 have a population of under fifty residents, with 37 communities of less than 100 and 82 communities of less the 500. Only seven communities have a population of between 500 and 2000 people. There is a very high percentage of people who emigrate from the area to large cities in Mexico into the United States in order to find work. This is particularly true for the small communities in the delegations of San Pedro Escanela, Ahuacatlán de Guadalupe and Santa Águeda. For this reason, the rate of population growth for the municipality has been very low, even though birthrates are relatively high. As of 2005, the population stood at 25,325. Over 93% of residents are Catholic.

The municipality has 27 preschools, 96 primary schools, 17 middle schools, one main high school in the municipal seat and three distance learning centers for high school level studies in Ahuacatlán de Guadalupe, San Pedro Escanela and Santa Águeda. About 1,600 people over the age of 15 are illiterate. A new educational space in the municipality is called the Centro Comunitario de Aprendizaje (Community Learning Center) where computer labs with Internet have been installed in areas such as Ahuacatlán de Guadalupe, Bucareli, Pinal de Amoles and Santa Águeda. The Instituto Tecnológico de Querétaro has a small facility at Pinal de Amoles. The mass migration to the United States has caused school attendance, especially primary school attendance to fall.

As of 2005, the municipality had 5,160 homes, with almost all of these owned by residents instead of rented. Almost all of these homes are independent houses. However, as of 2000, only 30% had all basic services such as water, gas, electricity and telephone. Less than half have electricity. In many areas, telephone service is communal rather than individual. Ninety eight percent of the population of the municipality is rural and lacks a basic service such as running water, electricity, sewer or roads according to municipal president Jorge Enrique Reséndiz Martínez. Cuatro Palos has no running water or other basic services. To attend secondary school, youngsters have to go to the municipal seat. Mobile health units visit this village twice a month.

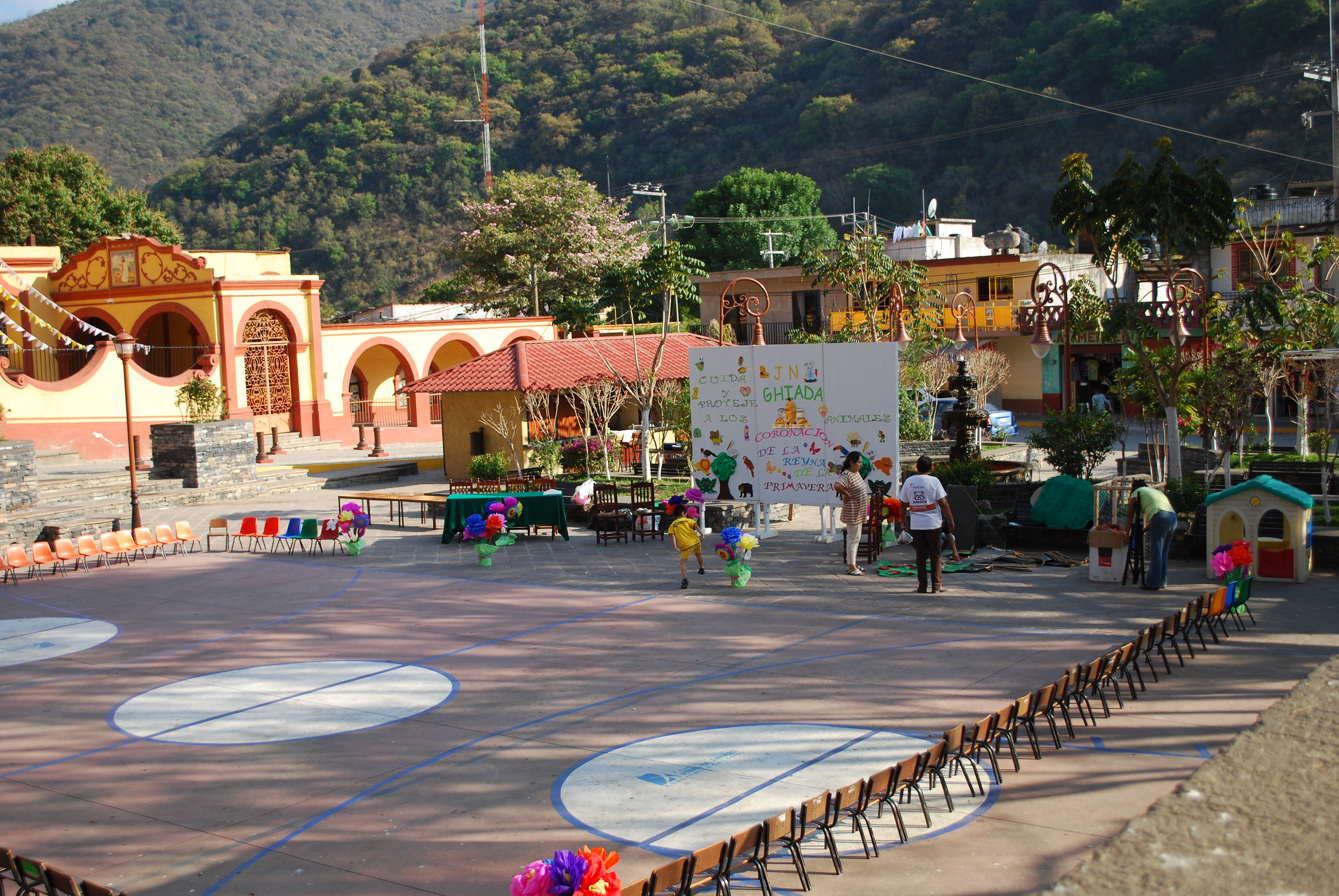
Main plaza in Ahuacatlán de Guadalupe

Ahuacatlán de Guadalupe is located next to the Escanela River. It is the second-largest community in the municipality with 1,366 residents. Its economy is based on services and commerce. Ahuacatlán also has several hotels and restaurants. The mission of Nuestra Señora de Guadalupe was founded in 1691 by Friar Felipe de Galindo of the Dominican order, and dedicated to the Virgin of Guadalupe. Its first missionary was Esteban López of the same order. It was handed over to regular clergy in 1756. The current building dates from 1886, sa the original one was destroyed while under repair, much like the church at San Pedro Escanela.

San Pedro el Viejo has 516 inhabitants and it is mostly dedicated to seasonal agriculture and orchards with fruits such as apples, plums, pine nuts and peaches. There is some forestry as well.

Santa Águeda has 491 inhabitants and has the least amount of natural resources in the municipality. The climate is semi-hot and dry, with mostly seasonal agriculture of corn, beans, chili peppers, squash, tomatoes and onions as its primary economic activity.

San Pedro Escanela has a population of 469, with agriculture as its main economic activity, including some fruit trees. However, it has the most important forests of the region with pines, cedars, oaks, oyamels and strawberry trees. San Pedro Escanela was founded as a mining camp called the Real de San Pedro Escanela. It was the head of a district called an Alcaldía Mayor from 1609 to 1675, when the depletion of local minerals cause the town to decline and the seat of government to move to Cadereyta. At its height, it had official jurisdiction over most of what is now the Sierra Gorda of Querétaro, making up about half of the territory that would become the state of Querétaro. Its original church was constructed in 1608 and originally manned by Franciscans, but these were withdrawn and replaced by Augustinians in 1609. Years after this, the monks were replaced by regular clergy. This church was destroyed as the roof was being replaced in 1877 and then rebuilt.

Bucareli has a population of 236, with mostly seasonal agriculture. There is only one museum in the municipality, which is the Community Museum of the Bucareli Delegation, but there are plans for a second in the municipal seat. The former monastery of Bucareli was begun in 1896, with a design similar to a medieval castle. It was founded by Ángelo Ruíz y Ruíz, Isidoro M. Ávila, Salvador Monroy, Domingo García and Pacífico Rendón, all Franciscans from Michoacán. The interior has two courtyards with arches and a fountain in the center, along with cells for the monks and a church which was never finished. There is also a chapel and sacristy, which were built later by Mariano Aguilera from Querétaro, along with three other rooms in a separate area locally known as “El Conventito” (The Little Monastery). These rooms contain 450 volumes on various topics in theology written in Latin.

The Bucareli Mission was named after viceroy Antonio María de Bucareli y Ursúa and founded by Brother Juan Guadalupe de Soriano, a Franciscan from San Diego de Acalá monastery in Mexico City. It had the objective of settling the local Chichimecas around it, including those which had escaped similar mission/settlements in Tolimán, Vizarrón and others. The architecture is square with a simple facade and interior.

The San Antonio Escanelilla church was constructed in 1775 under local priest Francisco José de Esquivel. It is a simple church with four pilasters on its facade, crowned by a pediment. Above the entrance there is an arch, and above this there are a niche and a choral window. It has one tower, which has small buttresses on its sides.

Cuatro Palos is a small village, whose main attraction is a lookout point over the various mountains of the area as well as the Bucareli Mission. The area also offers hiking and paths with signs, camping, birdwatching and tours of local apple farms. At the top of the village there is the iconic Cuatro Palos gazer from which you can see the whole Sierra Gorda landscape. Towns such as Bucarelli and Carricillo de Media Luna can be sighted from the top of the gazer.

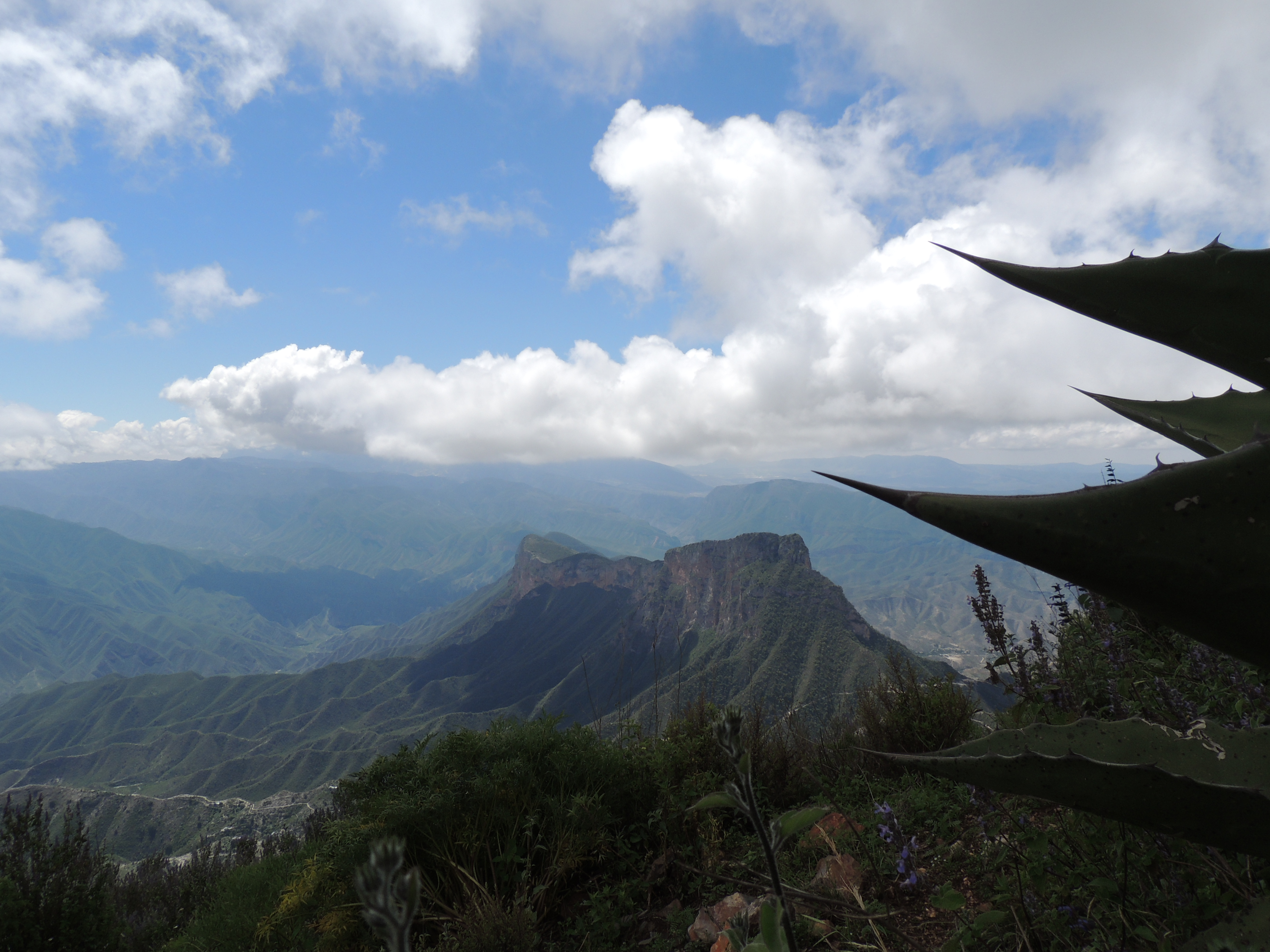
Gazer of Cuatro Palos view

The Puerta del Cielo (Door of Heaven) is an area just off Highway 120. The area is in forests of pine, cedar and white cedar. In the upper part, there is a chapel to the Virgin Mary with the inscription of “Virgen María Puerta del Cielo” (Virgin Mary Door of Heaven), from which the name is derived. This part of the highway has the highest altitude in Querétaro.

Tonatico is a valley on the east side of the municipality that has a number of houses and a church. The area has camping and hiking along its four small arroyos surrounded by trees.
