= Apapátaro =

Human settlement in Mexico

Coordinates: 20°28′00″N 100°22′00″W

Apapátaro is a village in the Mexican state of Querétaro. It is located in the municipality of Huimilpan. It has 1141 inhabitants, and is located at 1970 meters above sea level.
