= Colón Municipality, Querétaro =

Colón
- Municipality
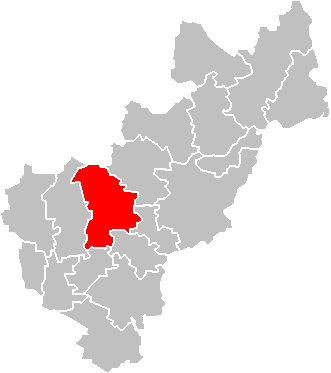
- Location of the municipality in Querétaro
- Coordinates: 20°47′N 100°03′W
- Country: Mexico
- State: Querétaro
- Municipal seat: Colón

Population (2020)
  - Total: 67,121
- Time zone: UTC-6 (Central)

Colón is a municipality in the central Mexican state of Querétaro. The municipal seat is at Colón, Querétaro.

== Recent municipal presidents ==
Name	Years	Party
Hugo Cabrera Ruíz	1991–1994	PRI
Leopoldo Bárcenas Uribe	1994–1997	PRI
Roberto de León Moreno	1997–2000	PRI
Juan Guevara Moreno	2000–2003	PRI
Leobardo Vázquez Briones	2003–2006	PRI
Alejandro Nieves Hernandez	2006–2009	PAN

== See also ==
- Urecho
