= Huimilpan Municipality =

Coordinates: 20.3752°N 100.2743°W

Huimilpan
- Municipality
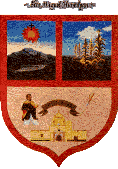
- Coat of arms
- Interactive map of Huimilpan
- Country: Mexico
- State: Querétaro

Population (2020)
  - Total: 36,808
  - Density: 94.83/km^{2} (245.6/sq mi)
- Time zone: UTC-6 (Central)

Huimilpan is a municipality in the central Mexican state of Querétaro. The municipal seat is at Huimilpan. Other populated places in Huimilpan include Apapátaro.
