= Urecho =

Coordinates: 20°39′15″N 100°04′28″W

Urecho is a village in the Mexican state of Querétaro. It is located in the municipality of Colón. It has 1,666 inhabitants, and is located at 2,100 meters above sea level.
