= Ezequiel Montes, Querétaro =

Municipality in Querétaro, Mexico

Ezequiel Montes, Querétaro, Mexico
Coat of Arms
Latitude	20.43° N
Longitude	99.59° W
Municipal president	Jorge Luis Vega Ocampo (PRI)
Municipal sindico	Ignacio Dorantes Esquivel (PAN)
Area	298.28 km^{2}
Population (2005)	34,729
HDI (2000)	0.7534
Time zone (UTC)	-6 UTC CST
GDP (per capita) (2000)	US$4.151,00
Official website: http://www.ezequielmontesenaccion.gob.mx http://www.villaprogresomx.com

Ezequiel Montes is a municipality in the Mexican state of Querétaro. Its seat is the town of the same name, founded in 1861 by Julián Velázquez Feregrino. Its original name was Corral Blanco.

Ezequiel Montes

The municipality was created in 1940, including the nearby towns of Bernal and Villa Progreso. As such, the municipality contains Saint Michael's temple, which was built from the 16th to the 18th centuries by the indigenous Otomies who lived in Querétaro and Jilotepec de Abasolo.

The main attractions are La Peña de Bernal, Freixenet vineyards and Villa Progreso.
