= San Joaquín Municipality, Querétaro =

San Joaquín
- City and Municipality
- Location within Querétaro Location within Mexico
- Coordinates: 20°59′N 99°30′W
- Country: Mexico
- State: Querétaro

Government
  - Federal electoral district: Querétaro's 1st

Area
  - Total: 275 km^{2} (106 sq mi)

Population (2020 census)
  - Total: 8,359
- (municipality)
- Time zone: UTC-6 (Central)
- Postal code: 76550

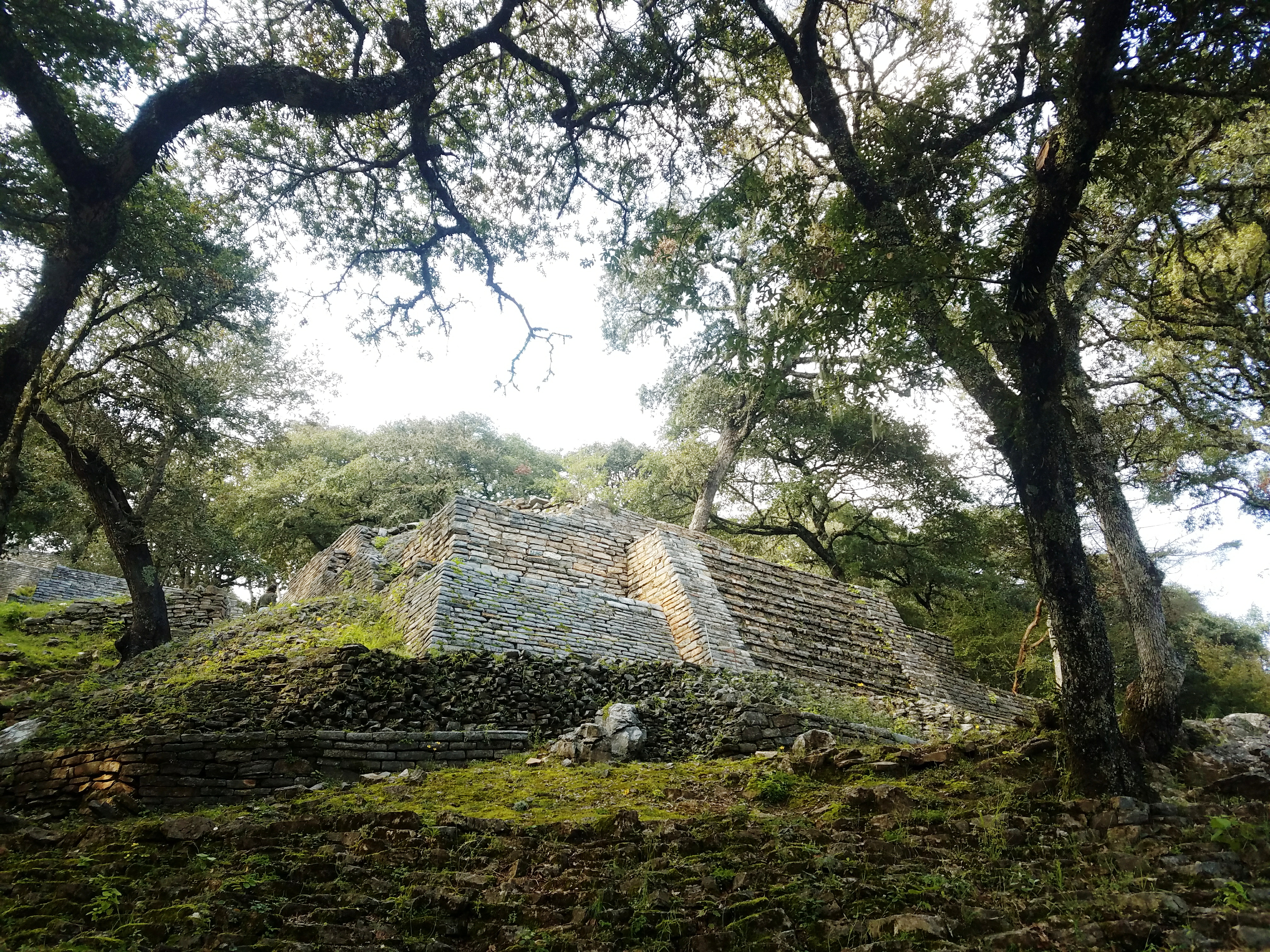
Las Ranas archaeological site

San Joaquín is a city in the central Mexican state of Querétaro. It serves as the municipal seat for the surrounding municipality of the same name.

San Joaquín was named a Pueblo Mágico by the federal Secretariat of Tourism (SECTUR) in 2015.

== History ==
Before the Spanish, the site at "Ranas" was a mining center, principally for cinnabar which was used as a pigment. The "Ranas" site was first mined about 400C.E. In 1622 the village of "San Nicolás Tolentino en el Paraje de las Rana" was founded. In 1682 the community of Ojo de Agua de Ranas was founded.

In 1724 Viceroy Juan de Acuña, 2nd Marquis of Casa Fuerte, granted the first land in the municipality. In 1728 the first Spanish mine was opened at San Juan Nepomuceno.

In 1864 the name "San Joaquín" was first used on a map.

== Geography ==
The municipality of San Joaquín covers an area of 275 km^{2} (106 sq mi), and is located between 99° 22' and 99° 39' West longitude, and between 21° 07' and 20° 53' North latitude. Altitude varies from a low of 600 meters to heights of 2,700 meters.

In the 2020 INEGI census, the municipality of San Joaquín reported a population of 8,359, down 5.71% from 2010.
