= Huimilpan =

Huimilpan, Querétaro, Mexico
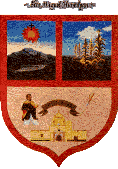
Coat of Arms
Latitude	20.22° N
Longitude	100.16° W
Municipal president	Jairo Ivan morales (pan)
Area	388.4 km²
Population (2005)	32,728
HDI (2000)	0.6824
Time zone (UTC)	-6 UTC CST
GDP (per capita) (2000)	US$2.187,00
Official website: http://www.huimilpanqro.gob.mx

Huimilpan is the seat of Huimilpan Municipality of the state of Querétaro. It is part of the Sierra Queretana, and sometimes included in the Metropolitan Area of Querétaro. It has an alpine weather, and is home to the Otomí people.
