= Pedro Escobedo Municipality =

Coordinates: 20.5000°N 100.1333°W

Pedro Escobedo
- Municipality
- Location of the municipality in Querétaro
- Country: Mexico
- State: Querétaro
- Seat: Pedro Escobedo

Population (2020)
  - Total: 77,404
- Time zone: UTC-6 (Central)
- Website: https://pedroescobedo.gob.mx/

Pedro Escobedo is a municipality in the central Mexican state of Querétaro. The municipal seat is at Pedro Escobedo.
