= Pedro Escobedo =

Pedro Escobedo, Querétaro, Mexico
Coat of Arms
Latitude	20.21° N
Longitude	100.19° W
Municipal president	Francisco Perrusquía Nieves
Area	290.9 km²
Population (2020)	13,390
HDI (2000)	0.7598
Time zone (UTC)	-6 UTC Central
GDP (per capita) (2000)	US$4.298,00
Official website: ?

Pedro Escobedo is the seat of the municipality of the same name in the Mexican state of Querétaro. It is part of the state's "industrial corridor".
