= Baquedano =

Baquedano may refer to:

== People ==
- Manuel Baquedano, Chilean military man during the War of the Pacific and provisional chief of government after the 1891 civil war
- Natalia Baquedano, Mexican photographer
- Fernando Baquedano, Chilean military man, father of Manuel Baquedano

== Places ==
- Baquedano, Antofagasta, a village in Chile.
- Baquedano metro station
- Plaza Baquedano
- Cordón Baquedano
- Baquedano Street
- Baquedano, Navarra, a town in Spain

== Ships ==
- Chilean frigate General Baquedano (PF-09)
- Chilean corvette Baquedano (1898)
