= Tlacote el Alto =

Town in Querétaro, Mexico

Coordinates: 20°41′N 100°32′W

Tlacote el Alto is a small town in Querétaro, Mexico. It is located at 1910 meters above sea level, and it has a population of 518 people. It is located near another town, Tlacote el Bajo.
