= Flag of Querétaro =

- Use: Civil and state flag
- Proportion: 4:7
- Adopted: September 22, 2015
- Design: Solid white with the Querétaro coat of arms in the center.

The Flag of Querétaro is the flag used by the Mexican state of Querétaro. The flag was adopted December 31, 2017. The State Flag consists of a white rectangle with a ratio of four to seven between the width and length; in the center it bears the State Coat of arms, placed in such a way that it occupies three-quarters of the width.

== History ==
The first flag of the state of Querétaro was officially adopted in September 22, 2015, it is a white banner with the entity's coat of arms.

== See also ==
- Flag of Mexico
- Coat of arms of Querétaro
