= Querétaro =

State of Mexico

Querétaro Ndämxei (Otomí)
- State
- Free and Sovereign State of Querétaro; Estado Libre y Soberano de Querétaro (Spanish); Hyodi Ndämxei (Otomí)
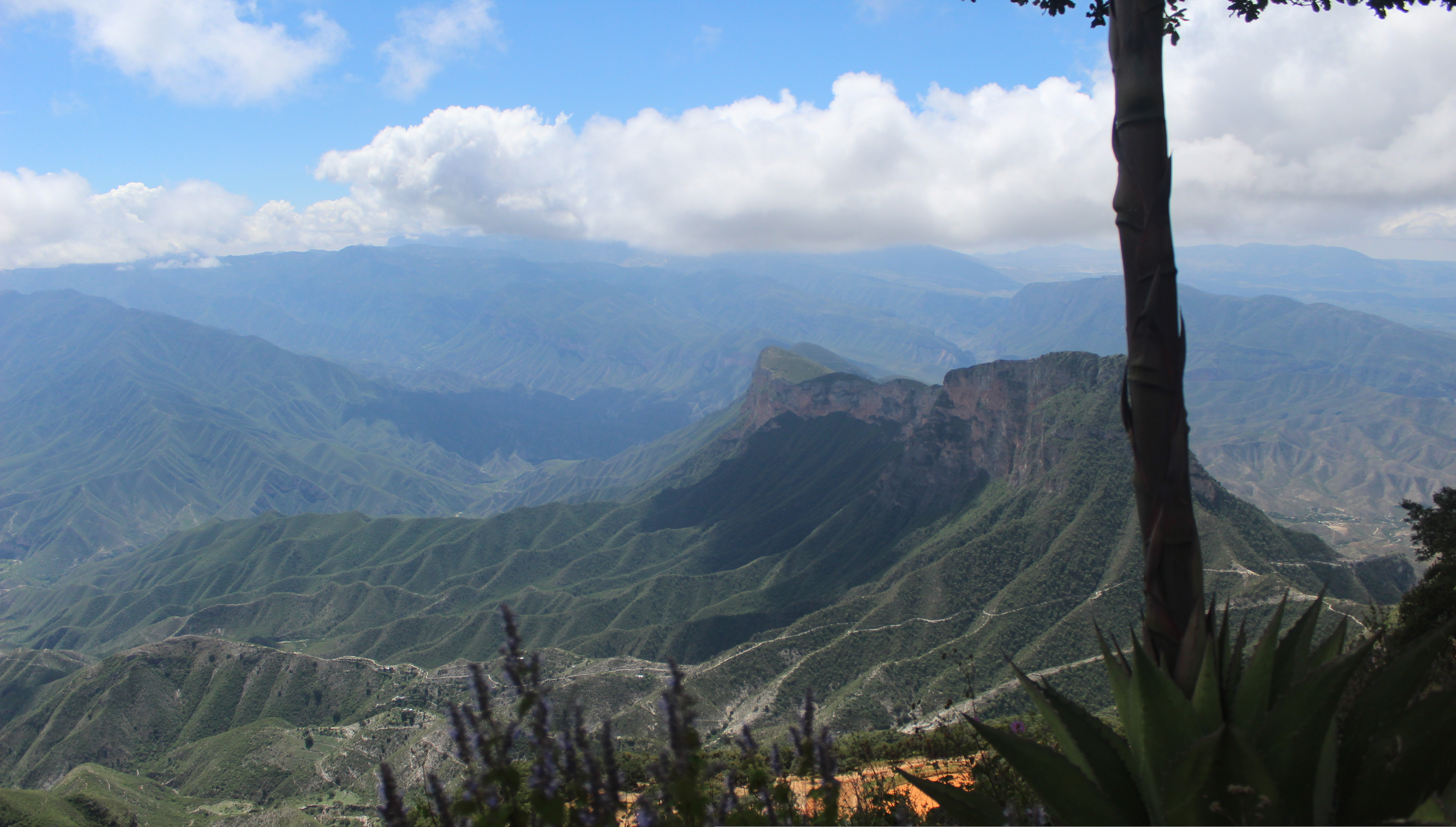
- The Sierra Gorda

- Flag Coat of arms

- State of Querétaro within Mexico
- Coordinates: 20°35′N 100°23′W
- Country: Mexico
- Capital and largest city: Santiago de Querétaro
- Largest metro: Greater Querétaro
- Municipalities: 18
- Admission: 23 December 1823
- Order: 11th

Government
  - Governor: Mauricio Kuri González
  - Senators: Agustín Dorantes Lámbarri; Guadalupe Murguía Gutiérrez; Beatriz Robles Gutiérrez
  - Deputies: Federal deputies: • Sonia Rocha Acosta (1st); • Marcia Solórzano Gallego (2nd); • Ignacio Loyola Vera (3rd); • Felipe Fernando Macías Olvera (4th); • Erika Díaz Villalón (5th)

Area
  - Total: 11,699 km^{2} (4,517 sq mi)
- Ranked 27th
- Highest elevation: 3,360 m (11,020 ft)

Population (2020)
  - Total: 2,368,467
  - Rank: 22nd
  - Density: 202.45/km^{2} (524.34/sq mi)
  - Rank: 7th out of 32
- Demonym: Queretano (a)

GDP (2022)
  - Total: MXN 656 billion (US$32.7 billion)
  - Per capita: US$13,266; 6th out of 32
- Time zone: UTC−6 (CST)
- Postal code: 76
- Area code: Area codes: • 414; • 419; • 427; • 441; • 442; • 448; • 487
- ISO 3166 code: MX-QUE
- HDI: ▲0.829 very high Ranked 6th of 32
- Website: Official Web Site

Querétaro, (Note: Spanish pronunciation: [keˈɾetaɾo]) officially the Free and Sovereign State of Querétaro, (Note: Spanish: Estado Libre y Soberano de Querétaro; Otomi: Hyodi Ndämxei) is one of the 32 federal entities of Mexico. It is divided into 18 municipalities. Its capital city is Santiago de Querétaro. It is located in north-central Mexico, in a region known as Bajío. It is bordered by the states of San Luis Potosí to the north, Guanajuato to the west, Hidalgo to the east, México to the southeast and Michoacán to the southwest.

The state is one of the smallest in Mexico, but also one of the most heterogeneous geographically, with ecosystems varying from deserts to tropical rainforest, especially in the Sierra Gorda, which is filled with microecosystems. The area of the state was located on the northern edge of Mesoamerica, with both the Purépecha Empire and Aztec Empire having influence in the extreme south, but neither really dominating it. The area, especially the Sierra Gorda, had a number of small city-states, but by the time the Spanish arrived, the area was independent from imperial powers. Small agricultural villages and seminomadic peoples lived in the area. Spanish conquest was focused on the establishment of Santiago de Querétaro, which still dominates the state culturally, economically and educationally.

For many years, the official name of the state was Querétaro Arteaga, (Note: For 19th-century governor José María Arteaga.) but in 2008 the State Legislature approved the adoption of the simpler name Querétaro.

== Geography ==
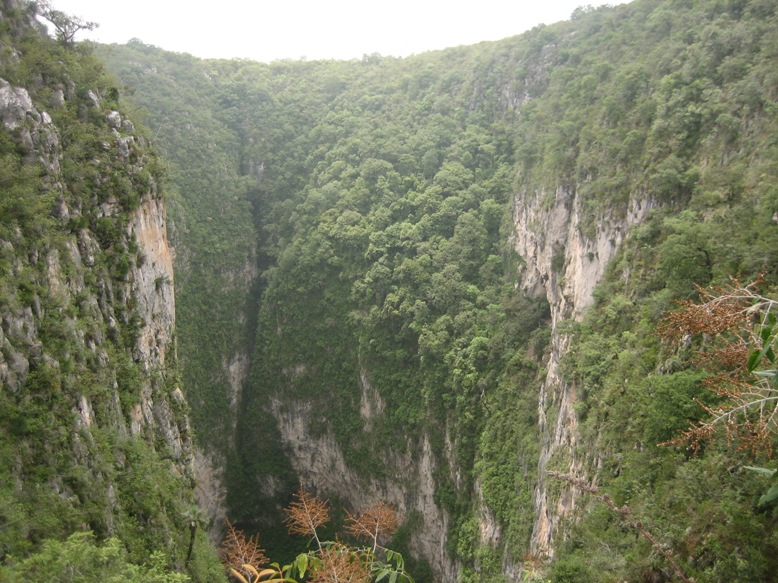
Sótano del Barro in the Sierra Gorda

Querétaro is located in the north-central area of Mexico, or the Sierra Madre Oriental, connecting the wetter climes of the south with the drier deserts of the north. The state is divided into 18 municipalities: Amealco de Bonfil, Arroyo Seco, Cadereyta de Montes, Colón, Corregidora, El Marqués, Ezequiel Montes, Huimilpan, Jalpan de Serra, Landa de Matamoros, Pedro Escobedo Municipality, Peñamiller, Pinal de Amoles, Querétaro, San Joaquín, San Juan del Río, Tequisquiapan and Tolimán.

Three of Mexico's geographic zones cover parts of the state. The Mesa del Centro is in the center-west of the state, and mostly consists of small mesas with an average altitude of 2,000 meters (6,562 feet) above sea level (ASL). A few elevations reach over 3,000 meters (9,843 feet). The Sierra Madre Oriental occupies the northeast of the state and includes the cities of Huasteca area. The topography of this area is rugged, with long mountain chains and narrow valleys. Elevations here range between 900 m (2,953 ft) and 3,000 m (9,843 ft) m ASL. The Trans-Mexican Volcanic Belt occupies about half of the state in the center and south. The area is mostly volcanic rock with peaks and mesas between 200 m (656 ft) and 3,000 m (9,843 ft) and valleys between 1,800 m (5,906 ft) and 1,900 m (6,234 ft) ASL.

The state is divided into five geographical regions: The Sierra Gorda, El Semidesierto Queretano, Los Valles Centrales, El Bajío Queretano and La Sierra Queretana. The Sierra Gorda is located in the north of the state and is part of the Sierra Madre Oriental, specifically in a subprovince called the Huasteco Karst. It is found in the municipalities of Arroyo Seco, Jalpan de Serra, Landa de Matamoros, Pinal de Amoles and San Joaquín and covers an area of 3,789km2 or 32.2% of the state. The topography is rugged, with high elevations and steep valleys. It is a conjunction of mountains and hills formed mostly by limestone, with wide contrasts in climates and vegetation. They range from near desert conditions to forests of pine and holm oak to the tropical rainforests of the Huasteca area in the state of San Luis Potosí. The Sierra Gorda was made a biosphere reserve in 1997, the Reserva de la Biosfera de la Sierra Gorda, to protect its abundance of species and ecosystems. In 2001, the area was registered with the Man and the Biosphere Programme of UNESCO. This area is managed by la Comisión Nacional de Áreas Naturales Protegidas of the Secretariat of Environment and Natural Resources federal agency.

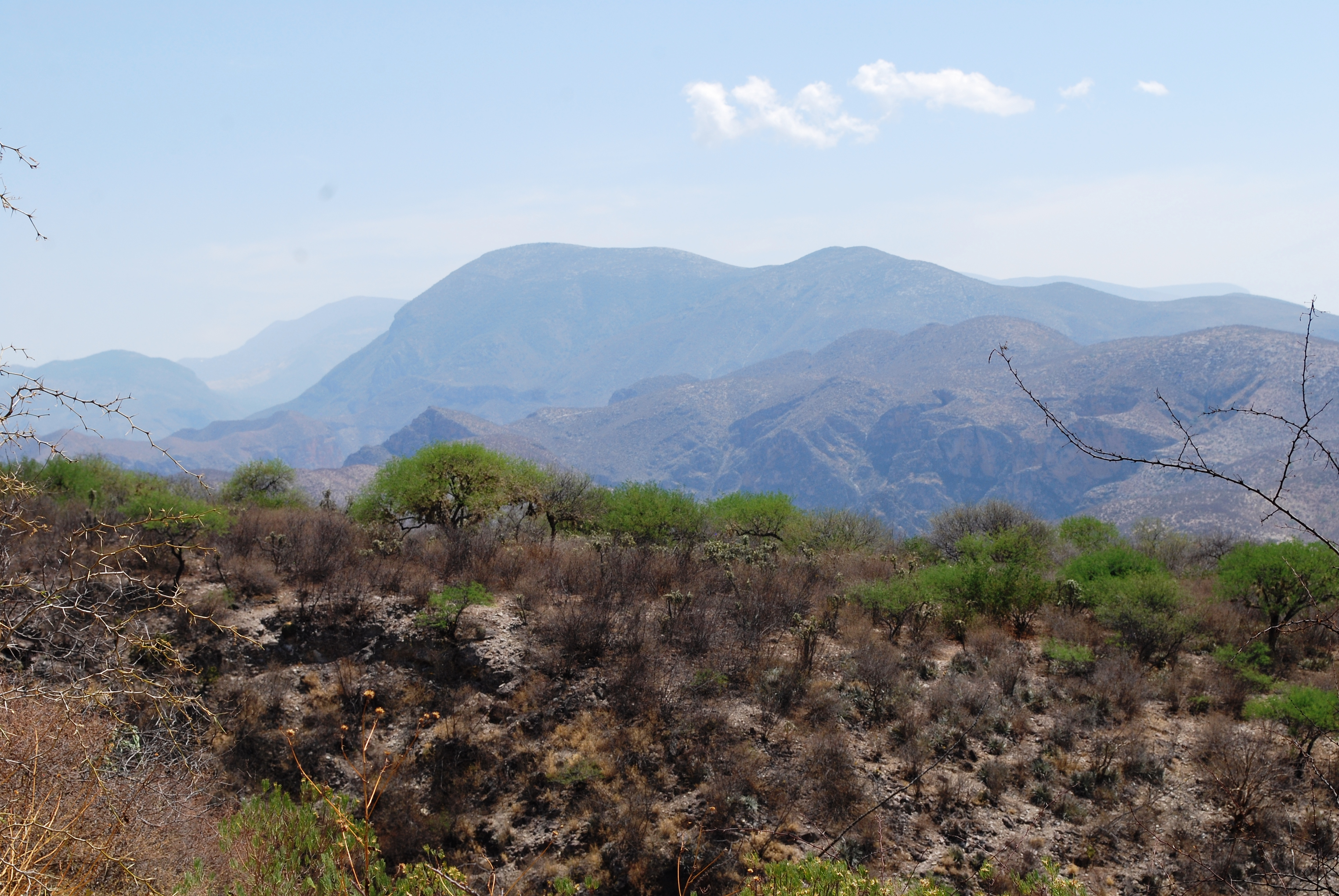
Semidesert area in the municipality of Peñamiller

El Semidesierto Queretano (Querétaro Semidesert) is a wide strip that crosses the state from east to west, which is dry due to the blocking of moist air from the Gulf by the Sierra Madre Oriental. The area is found in the municipalities of Cadereyta de Montes, Colón, Peñamiller and Tolimán, with an area of 3,415.6km2 or 29% of the state. As it is near the mountain range, its topography is relatively rugged. Los Valles Centrales (Central Valleys) is in the center of the state, overlapping almost all of the area formed by the Trans-Mexican Volcanic Belt, with the exception of the north of the El Marqués municipality, which is in the Mesa del Centro. The continental divide runs through here marked by the Sierra Queretana, the El Macizo and El Zamoarano mountain chains. This area occupies the municipalities of Ezequiel Montes, El Marqués, Pedro Escobedo and San Juan del Río with an extension of 2,480.2kmw or 21.1% of the state. El Bajío Queretano is in the western part of the state, which is a low elevation area that extends into neighboring Guanajuato. This area covers 1,005.7km2 or 8.5% of the state, and contains low hills and small mountain chains that are part of the Trans Mexican Volcanic Belt. La Sierra Queretana (Querétaro Sierra Mountains) is in the extreme south of the state, and also part of the Trans-Mexican Volcanic Belt. It is mostly found in the municipalities of Amealco de Bonfil and Huimilpan, covering an area of 1,078.3 km or 9.2% of the state. The area has high peaks and plains that narrow into valleys and canyons. Some of the flat areas border the Lerma River.

The state contains two river basins: the Lerma/Santiago and the Pánuco. The first is represented by the Lerma and La Laja Rivers and the second is represented by the Tamuín and Moctezuma Rivers. Other important rivers include the Santa María and the San Juan. These rivers contain 16 dams, including the Santa Catarina, El Batán, Constitution de 1917 and the San Ildefonso.

Most of the state is dry, with the exception of the north, which is temperate and rainy. The average temperature is 18 °C (64 °F). Three well-defined climate areas are in the state. The south has a temperate and fairly wet climate. Temperatures are relatively stable through the year, ranging from an average of between 12 and 18 °C (64 °F), with most rain falling in the summer. This region includes the municipalities of Amealco, Huimilpan, Pedro Escobedo, San Juan del Río and Corregidora. The center and west have drier and hotter climates, especially in areas under 2,000 m ASL. Here, the Sierra Madre Oriental and parts of the Trans Mexican Volcanic Belt impede moist air from arriving. This dry area includes the municipalities of Querétaro, Corregidora, El Marqués, Peñamiller, Esequiel Montes, Cadereyta, San Juan del Río, Tolimán and Tequisquiapan. The Sierra Madre Oriental area has climates that range from temperate to cold, varying significantly from north to south and even more due to altitude. The north tends to be warmer than the south, but average temperatures can range from 18 to 28 °C (64 to 82 °F) in lower elevations and between 14 and 20 °C (57 and 68 °F) in higher elevations.

The state's ecosystems have 18 different classifications ranging from tropical rainforest to arid scrub brush. Deciduous rainforest is found in parts of the north, center and west of the state such as Jalpan de Serra, Arroyo Seco and Landa de Matamoros. Small deciduous forests are found in Jalpan de Serra and Landa de Matamoros. Oyamel forests are found in the highest elevations of El Zamorano in the municipalities of El Marqués and Colón. Pure pine forests are found in Cadereyta de Montes, Pinal de Amoles, San Joaquín and Landa de Matamoros. Mixed pine and holm oak forests are found in the Sierra de El Zamorano and the El Lobo region, opposite the Sierra Madre Oriental. Deciduous oak forests are found in the municipalities of Amealco de Bonfil, Landa de Matamoros, El Marqués, and a number of others, but only at altitudes between 1,600 and 2,800 m ASL. Juniper and cedar forests are found in Pinal de Amoles, Landa de Matamoros, San Joaquín and Cadereyta de Montes at altitudes of between 1,390 and 2,500 m, generally on low hills. Mesquite forests are scarce given that they tend to grow on land suitable for agriculture, but some can still be found in Pedro Escobedo, San Juan del Río, Cadereyta de Montes and other municipalities. The two types of grasslands are those with some trees and those with none. The latter is much more common and found in various parts of the south of the state. Grasslands dotted with trees are found only in the municipality of Querétaro. The other five ecosystems are dominated by various types of arid scrub brush, ranging from those dominated by thorns, without thorns and intermixed with various types of cactus.

The Cerro del Cimatario, on the borders of the municipalities of Corregidora, Querétaro and El Marqués, has been declared a national park and biosphere reserve due to its forests.

Quakes are not uncommon in the state, so there are monitoring stations in Peñamiller, Extoraz, Peña Blanca and 10 in the Sierra Gorda, including Jalpan de Serra, Landa de Matamoros, Arroyo Seco, Pinal de Amoles and San Joaquín. More are planned for Tolimán and Cadereyta. In January 2011, about 70 small quakes caused some damage in the Peñamiller area, in the north, causing a certain amount of panic in the area with an average strength of 3.5 on the Richter magnitude scale; this is not normal for this area. The quakes are believed to be related to mining in the area, but the government denies this.

== Demographics ==
Largest cities or towns in Querétaro Source:
Rank		Municipality	Pop.
1	Santiago de Querétaro	Querétaro	794,789
2	San Juan del Río	San Juan del Río	177,719
3	El Pueblito	Corregidora	115,264
4	Juriquilla	Querétaro	39,244
5	Tequisquiapan	Tequisquiapan	34,955
6	San Pedro Mártir	Querétaro	31,677
7	San José el Alto	Querétaro	29,758
8	Santa Rosa Jáuregui	Querétaro	22,168
9	Saldarriaga	El Marqués	21,516
10	Venceremos	Corregidora	21,352

Historical population
Year	Pop.	±%
1895	232,305	—
1900	232,389	+0.0%
1910	244,663	+5.3%
1921	220,231	−10.0%
1930	234,058	+6.3%
1940	244,737	+4.6%
1950	286,238	+17.0%
1960	355,045	+24.0%
1970	485,523	+36.7%
1980	739,605	+52.3%
1990	1,051,235	+42.1%
1995	1,250,476	+19.0%
2000	1,404,306	+12.3%
2005	1,598,139	+13.8%
2010	1,827,937	+14.4%
2015	2,038,372	+11.5%
2020	2,368,467	+16.2%

As of 2020, the state had a population of 2,368,467 and a population density of 137 inhabitants per square kilometer. Over the 20th century, from 1900 to 2005, the state's population has grown from 232,389 to the current figure. Growth rates were highest in the 1970s at over 4%, but since have come down to 1.9%. The fastest rates of population growth in the state now are in Querétaro and San Juan del Río at about 4%. Two, Arroyo Seco and Peñamiller, have lost population in the previous decades. The capital city of Santiago de Querétaro has nearly half of the state's population. Other major cities include San Juan del Río (208,462), Corregidora (104,218), El Marqués (231,668) and Cadereyta de Montes (57,204). About 37% lives in the 1420 communities with between 1 and 1,999 inhabitants, and 16% in communities of between 2,000 and 14,999. The population of the state is sparse in most areas, concentrated in only one true urban center and some smaller communities. Living standards are higher than average for Mexico in and around the city of Querétaro, but diminish significantly in the rural areas.

One important factor in the population growth has been migration into the state from other parts of Mexico due to the state's industry, low crime rate and other factors. One recent phenomenon has been the influx of families from northern border states migrating south to escape drug-related violence. An estimated 49 new families move into the state every 24 hours, on average. This has made attendance at private universities climb 11% especially at ITESM-Querétaro, Universidad Anáhuac and the Universidad del Valle de México. Most of the families are moving to the area in and around the capital.

Over 96% of the population is Catholic, with very small percentages reporting as Protestant or Evangelical. The state is not culturally or socially homogenous. The first large distinction is between those who live in the mountains and those who live in the valleys. Those in the mountains are closer culturally to those living on the Gulf Coast, with the latter having more in common with cultures found in the west of Mexico and the central highlands .

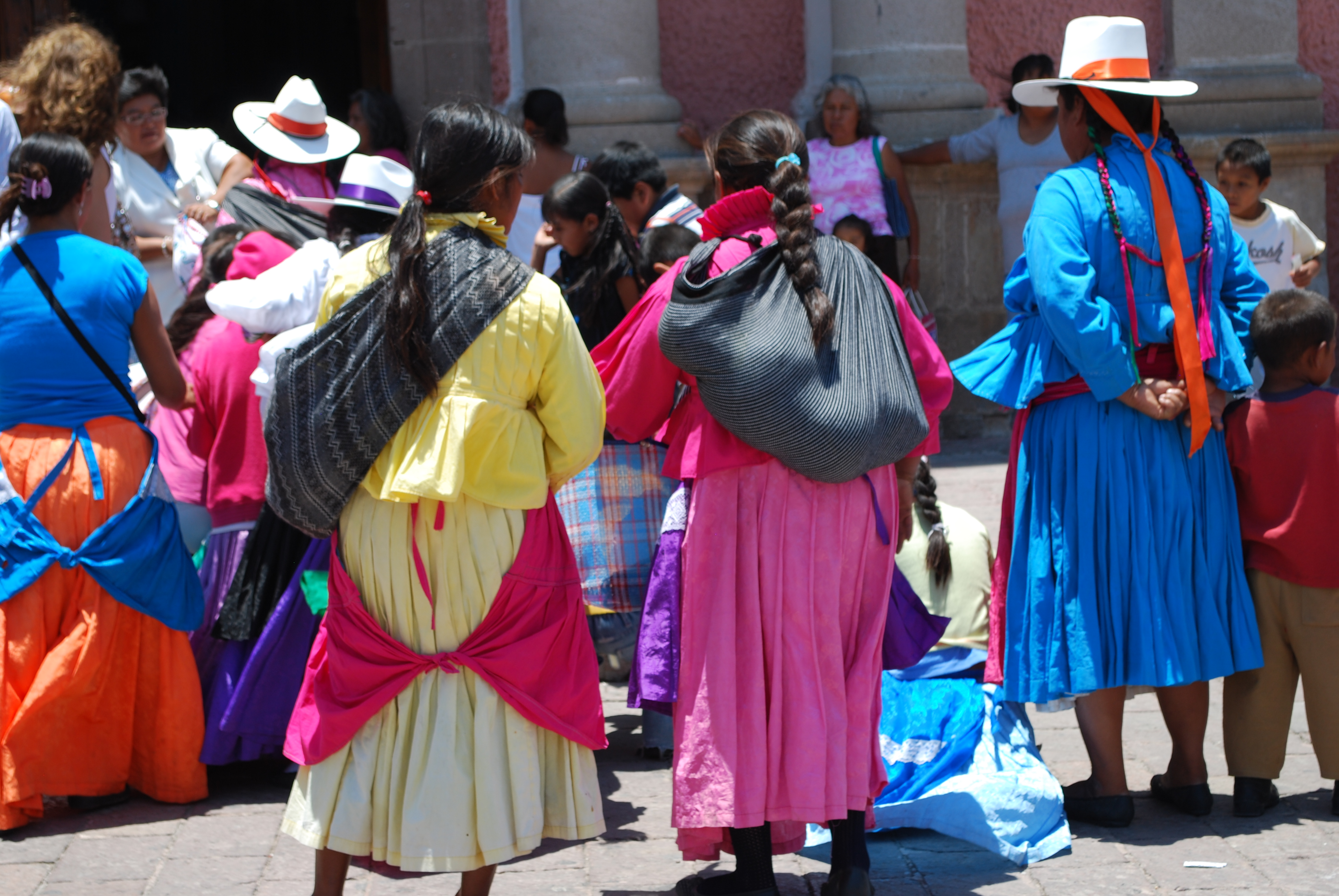
Otomi women in Tequisquiapan

There are indigenous communities in seven of the 18 municipalities of the state, mostly Otomi and Pame. These communities are divided into three regions: South, Arid Center and Sierra Madre Oriental, with the Otomis dominating in the first two and the Pames in the last. The most important indigenous group in the state is the Otomi. These people have inhabited central Mexico for over 5,000 years and were part of cities and empires such as Cuicuilco, Teotihuacan and Tula. Their language is part of the Oto-Manguean family, which includes Pame, Mazahua, Matlatzinca and the Chichimeca-Jonaz languages. They have maintained their language, which is called hñahñu, which literally means to speak with nasal sounds. However, most Otomi speakers are bilingual. Their name for themselves varies in the different areas of central Mexico where they live, but in southern part of Querétaro, they call themselves the Ñano. Otomi communities in the state have their own authorities, in addition to Mexican ones, in both the civil and religious arenas, who are elected annually. Most profess the Catholic faith, but it is influenced by indigenous beliefs. The trading of goods is still an important part of the economy of many Otomi communities, and they are known for their abilities with herbal medicines. A number who live in rural areas can still be seen in traditional dress. For women, this includes a hand-embroidered blouse and skirt, a garment called a quexquemetl and huaraches. For men, this includes shirts and pants of undyed or white cotton, tied with an embroidered belt, huaraches and a hat made with palm fronds. These communities are located in south in Amealco de Bonfil. Here, over 25,000 people live in 31 communities, such as San Ildefonso, Tultepec, Santiago Mexquititlán, Chitejé de la Cruz and San Miguel Tlaxcatltepec. In the arid parts of the center of the state, indigenous communities are found in the municipalities of Tolimán, Cadereyta, Colón and Ezequiel Montes, with about 21,500 Otomis in 56 different communities. In the Sierra Madre Oriental, about 3,775 people, mostly Pame with an important group of Huastecas are found in three communities in the municipalities of Jalpan de Serra and Arroyo Seco. However, of all the people in these indigenous communities, only a total of 23,363 spoke an indigenous language, primarily Otomi, as of 2005. Most (94.8%) of these were also speakers of Spanish.

According to the 2020 Census, 1.83% of Querétaro's population identified as Black, Afro-Mexican, or of African descent.

== Culture ==
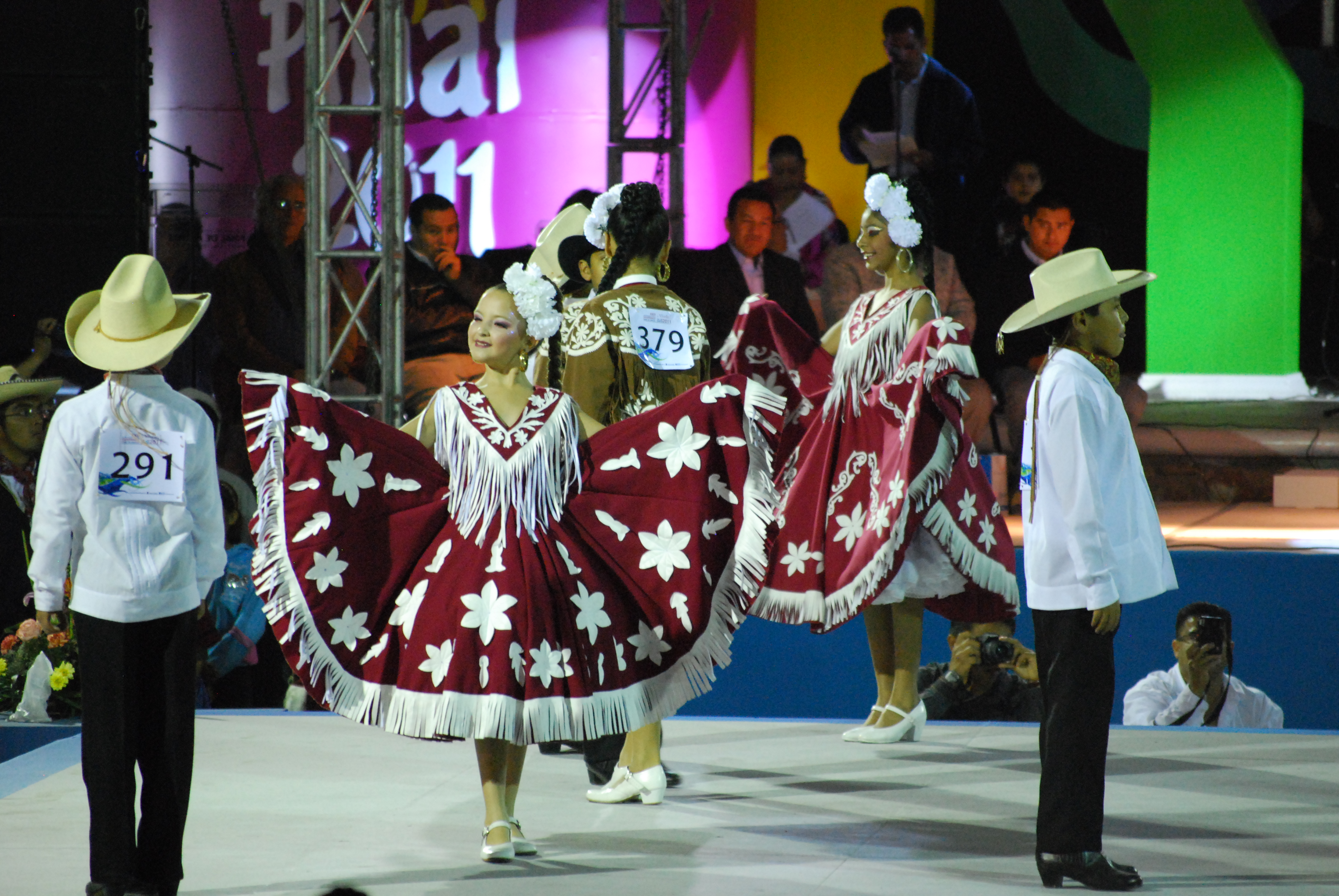
Scene at the 2011 National Huapango Dance Competition in Pinal de Amoles

Western painting developed in the state during the colonial period, when artists such as Pedro de Rojas López, Tomás Noriega and Diego Sanabria produced primarily religious art. More diverse production came into being in the 19th century forward; José Mariano Perrusquia y Rubio, Mariano Montenegro and Germán Patiño Díaz produced paintings and even photography. Patiño Díaz was the director of the old Academia de Dibujo y Pintura de San Fernando, which trained more artists in the state such as Agustín Rivera Ugalde. The 20th century produced artists such as Braulio Rodríguez Granda, Jesús Rodríguez de la Vega, Jesús Águila Herrera and Restituto Rodríguez Camacho. The current generation of Querétaro artists includes Rafael Rodríguez, Virginia Ledesma, Ramsés de la Cruz and Juan Eduardo Muñoz. In the field of photography, Natalia Baquedano was one of the first women to open a photographic studio in Mexico. She began her training in Querétaro, before moving to Mexico city.

The state has produced a large number of writers. Major writers from the 19th century include poet and journalist Juan María Wenceslao Sánchez de la Barquera y Morales, poet and short story writer Néstora Téllez Rendón, poet and orator Celestino Díaz Domínguez, journalist and playwright Luis Frías Hernández, writer and doctor Hilarión Frías y Soto and poet and academic Juan B. Delgado. The early 20th century produced poet and translator Francisco Cervantes, arguably the most important literary figure from Querétaro internationally; poet and journalist José Dolores Frías Rodríguez, songwriter Carlos Cabrera Pedraza, novelist Alfredo Coéllar Gómez and poet Carlos Septién García. The current generation of writers includes poets Román Luján, Luis Alberto Arellano, Benjamín Moreno, César Cano and Tadeus Argüeyo.

Indigenous music can be found in Otomi areas, such as in the municipalities of Amealco and the arid central areas of the state. Often this includes trios consisting of two flutes or two violins with a drum, most often played for community celebrations. The Otomi of Tolimán have a variant of Otomi music called viñuetes, which is played with one large drum, one small drum and a violin. Huapango is a dominant musical form in the Sierra Gorda and some of the arid areas of the center of the state. Two types are generally played: Huasteco and Arribeño. Huasteco is played in trios with two guitars called huapanguera and the smaller jarana huasteca and a violin. The songs consist of stanzas of four to six verses sung in falsetto, often with improvisation. The Arribeño is most common in the mountains areas bordering the states of San Luis Potosí and Guanajuato. It is played in groups of four with a huapanguera, a vihuela and two violins. Lyrics tend to be poetic and sung from memory or improvised. Some are religious in nature. Another indigenous form of music, called comesolos, played with a flute and drum has almost completely died out. In the mountain village of San Joaquín in April is the Concurso Nacional de Huapango Huasteco (National Huasteca Huapango Contest). This event attracts thousands of visitors and participants each year, as it is the most important Huapango contests in the country.

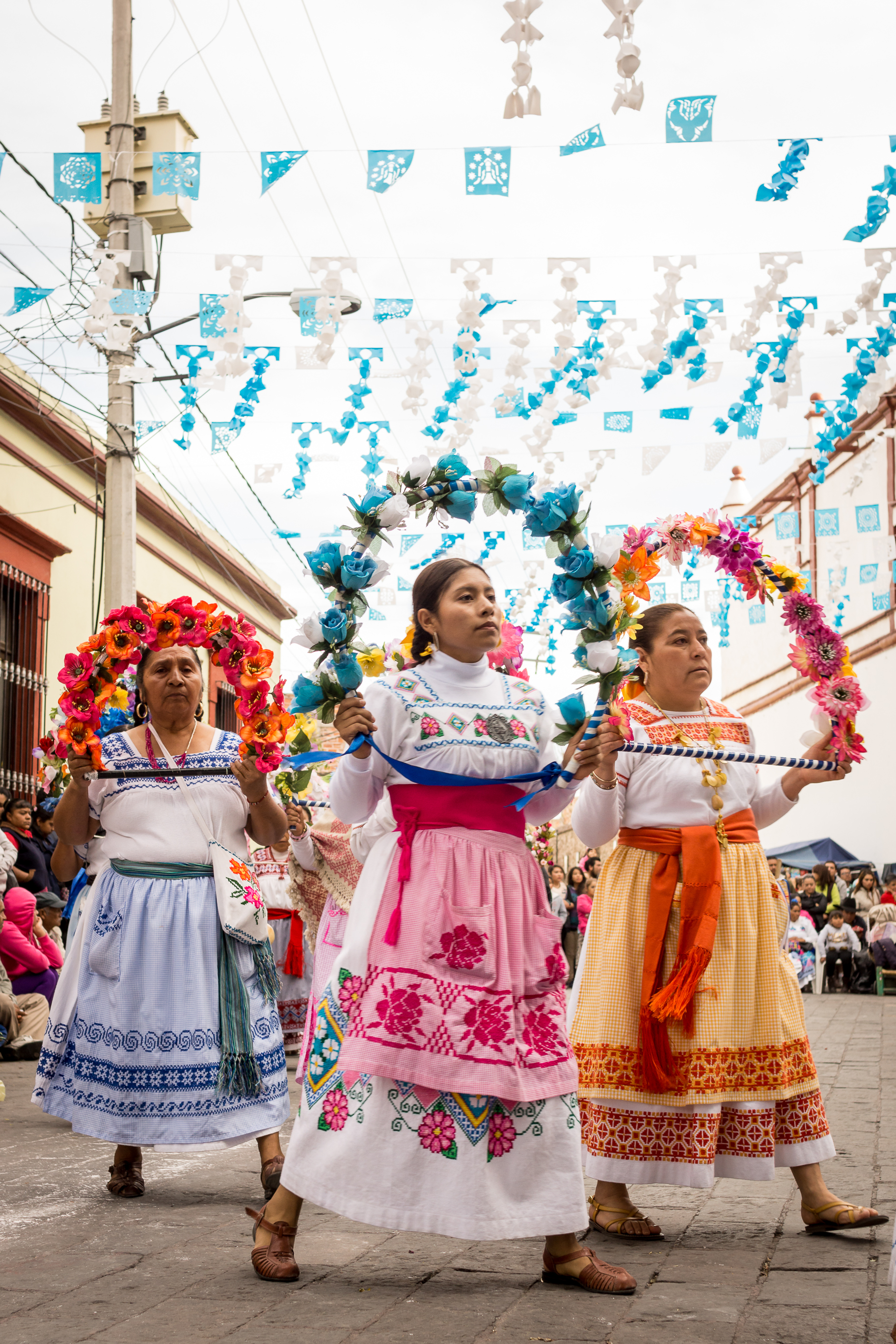
Baile de las inditas in El Pueblito, Corregidora Municipality. The dances are performed during the fiesta patronal of the Virgen of El Pueblito

Most traditional festivals are tied to the Catholic religion, with some of the most important being La Candelaria (Candlemas), Holy Week and Day of the Dead. Locally important are the myriad of festivals to patron saints of towns, villages and municipalities. In addition, ta number of civic and economic festivals and fairs include celebrations of the founding of the various cities, regional fairs in Cadereyta, El Marqués, Jalpan de Serra and others to showcase local products and culture.

México Folklórico is a dance group created in 1990 within the Academia de la Cultura of the state teachers' union. It consists of teachers' children, who are studying high school or above, as an extracurricular activity. Its repertoire includes dances and other traditions from various parts of Mexico. It has performed in many parts of Mexico, as well as in the rest of the Americas and Europe.

The cooking of the Sierra Gorda region is strongly influenced by the Huasteca cuisine of neighboring Hidalgo and San Luis Potosí states. One notable dish is sacahuil, which is a large tamal wrapped in the leaves of a plant called a papatla. This dish is most prevalent in Landa de Matamoros and Jalpan de Serra. During festivals in San Miguel Tolimán, the main dish is chickpeas with saffron accompanied by tortillas in a number of colors. In Peñamiller, they celebrate with goat meat, accompanied by pulque. Another common dish in this areas is a variety of tostadas called arriero (donkey handler) . Simichol is a fermented corn drink prepared in Santiago Mexquititlán. In San Joaquín, the drink is called charape, made with piloncillo. In this and other central municipalities, gorditas de migajas (literally crumb gorditas) is a common dish.

Traditional food products include a candy made of guava fruit and sugar, jams, and sweets made from pulque, milk candies from Bernal, a hard bread called mezquitamal, which is made by the Otomis, and various types of mole sauces made in Amealco. In the Sierra Gorda area, gorditas can be prepared with sugar, cheese, and piloncillo. The zacahuil, a large type of tamale, is filled with chicken, turkey or pork with dried chili pepper. A number of insects are used, especially in indigenous dishes such as tantárreas (ants from a type of mesquite tree) and escamoles, often cooked with cactus flowers. One native beverage, called mejengue, is made with piloncillo (a type of sugar derived from the cane plant), banana, pulque and corn.

== History ==
The official name of the state is "Estado Libre y Soberano de Querétaro" (Free and Sovereign State of Querétaro). The formal name of the capital is Santiago de Querétaro. However, both are commonly referred to simply as Querétaro. The most likely origin of the name is from the Purépecha word "Créttaro" which means "place with crags". However, there have been other explanations of the name including that it comes from Nahuatl and means Mesoamerican ball court, or even "island of the blue salamanders". Nevertheless, other scholars suggest that it can mean "place of the reptiles" or "place of the giant rocks". The city received the title of Noble y Leal Ciudad de Santiago de Querétaro in 1656, but after Independence, it was changed to simply Querétaro. It was returned to Santiago de Querétaro in 1996, when it was named a World Heritage Site. The ending of "de Arteaga" was added to the state's name in 1867 in honor of General José María Arteaga. Originally from Mexico City, Arteaga became governor of Querétaro and distinguished himself as a soldier in the middle of the 19th century. It was removed in 2008.

Agricultural settlements dated to about 500 BCE have been found in the San Juan del Río and Huimilpan areas, which was during the Teotihuacan era. The ancient city had interest and influence in the area because of its agriculture, but did not dominate it. After the fall of this city, the Querétaro area had its highest rate of development of both agriculture and social structure. The area was inhabited early on by a number of ethnicities, including the Otomi, Toltecs, Chichimecas, Purépechas and Mexicas. In the 10th century, the area experienced population shifts which did not stabilize until the 12th century. Much of this migration moved south from the Querétaro area into the Valley of Mexico. Those who remained by the end of the 12th century were mostly in hunter-gatherer communities and small agricultural settlements. The region's agriculture and minerals continued to attract the interest of more powerful neighbors. In the 15th century, both the Aztec Empire and Purépecha Empire had strong influence parts of the state, especially in the south, but would never incorporate the area completely into either empire. The Aztec's interest in the area was mostly to use it as a bulwark against marauding northern Chichimeca tribes, and it never became a tributary state. During this time, as well, a number of new peoples entered the state, most likely from the north, primarily the Pames and the Chichimeca Jonaz. The first group practiced agriculture in the valleys and the latter in the mountain areas.

When the Spanish conquered the Aztec Empire in the early 16th century, the largest indigenous group in the state was the Otomi, many of whom were living more or less under Purépecha rule. This population would increase with Otomi refugees from Aztec lands fleeing the Spanish. Another significant group was the Chichimecas. With the fall of Tenochtitlán, then the Purépecha Empire, the Spanish gained some control over the southern portion of the state. However, the area was still very independent, filled with peoples who lived in small isolated villages or nomadically. There were no major cities, nor large societies there or north.

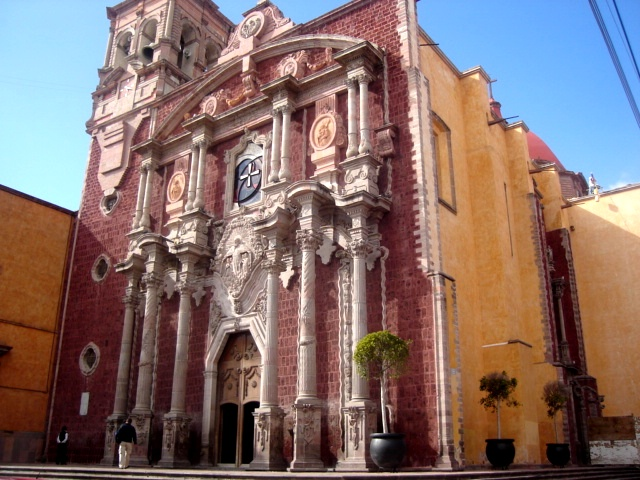
Cathedral of Querétaro

The conquest and colonization of Querétaro began with the Spanish settlements at San Juan del Río, Querétaro and Huimilpan between 1529 and 1531. Conquistador Hernán Pérez de Bocanegra joined forces with a local Otomi lord from Jilotepec named Conín, also known as Fernando de Tapia, to enter Otomi areas in what is now the city of Querétaro. There would be only one major battle as part of the conquest in 1531. The Spanish and their indigenous allies were battling the local Otomi and Chichimecas at a hill now known as Sangremal, which was then called Ynlotepeque, and considered sacred in pre-Hispanic times. Chronicles of this event, such as those written by Friar Isidro Félix de Espinoza, state that the natives were at the point of winning when a total eclipse of the sun occurred. This supposedly scared the natives and the Spanish claimed to have seen an image of Saint James (the patron saint of Spain) riding a white horse carrying a rose-colored cross. This event caused the natives to surrender. This event is why the city is called Santiago (Saint James) de Querétaro, with James as patron saint A stone cross imitating the one the Spanish supposedly saw was erected on the hill, which later was accompanied by a church and monastery.

During the rest of the 16th century, the Spanish city of Querétaro would form the northern extension of known lands to the Spanish conquerors. The Spanish initially shared power in the area with local indigenous leaders until well into the 17th century in many areas. Indigenous power waned over time, eventually disappearing completely. However, the Spanish would not subdue and evangelize the last of the resistant peoples, the Chichimec Jonaz until the end of the 18th century.

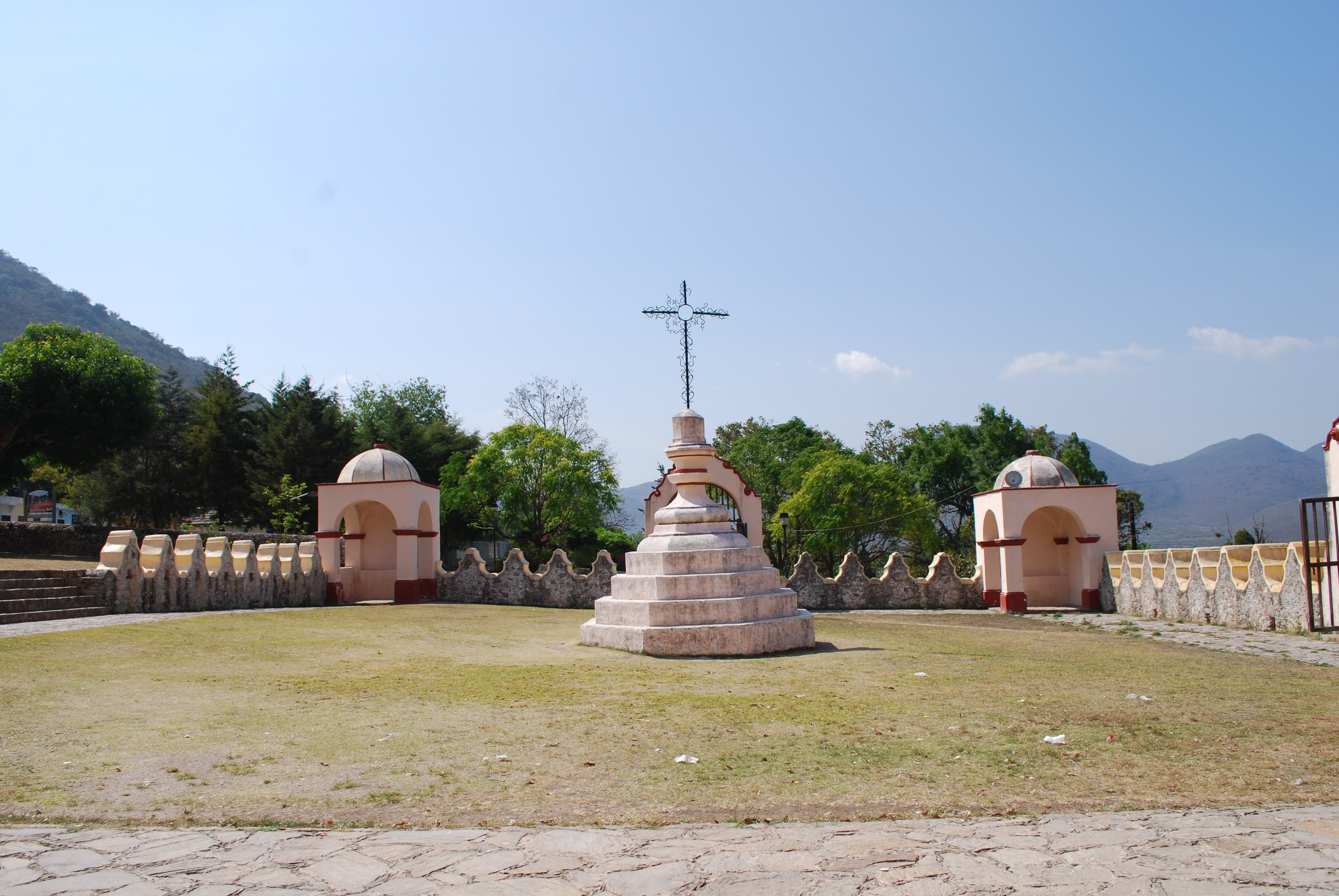
Atrim with cross at Tilaco, Landa de Matamoros, one of the five missions attributed to Junípero Serra

Most of the north of the state consists of an area known as the Sierra Gorda, which is an area of very rugged terrain, with widely varying climates. From the 16th to 19th centuries The Spanish would slowly dominate the lands around it, south in Querétaro, west in Guanajuato and east in Hidalgo, with only military and missionary incursions into the area's interior. This was due to the fierce resistance of the local native peoples. Unlike the Pames on the south, the Chichimeca Jonaz were mostly hunter gatherers, not city dwellers, and they were not used to a hierarchical governing system. Attempts to militarily pacify and evangelize the area had little success, with a number of missions never completed or destroyed shortly after they were built. In the mid 18th century, the colonial government in Mexico City decided to make a concerted effort to bring this territory into submission, as it contained important routes to mining areas such as Zacatecas and Guanajuato. José de Escandón was sent in 1727 to pacified a revolt of Pames in Celaya, and was promoted to sergeant mayor of the regiment. In 1732, he subdued rebels at the mines in Guanajuato, and the following year he did the same at Irapuato. In 1734 he pacified 10,000 indigenous rebels at San Miguel el Grande. For these accomplishments, he was promoted to colonel and assigned as an aide to the captain general of the Sierra Gorda. However, it wasn't until 1748 that José de Escandón won the Battle of Media Luna, in which the Chichimecas were decisively defeated. The Sierra Gorda missions, some 90 miles north of Santiago de Querétaro, were nestled in a vast region of jagged mountains, home of the Pame people and a scattering of Spanish colonists. When Junípero Serra and Francisco Palóu arrived at the village of Jalpan, they found the mission in disarray: The parishioners, numbering fewer than a thousand, were attending neither confession nor Mass. Junípero Serra tackled the practical side of mission administration; working with the college of San Fernando, he had cattle, goats, sheep, and farming tools brought to the Sierra Gorda mission. Francisco Palóu supervised the farm labor of men of the mission, while the women learned spinning, sewing and knitting. Their products were collected and rationed to the mission residents, according to personal needs. Christian Pames sold their surplus products in nearby trading centers, under the friars' supervision to protect them from cheaters. Pames who adapted successfully to mission life received their own parcels of land to raise corn, beans and pumpkins, and sometimes received oxen and seeds as well. Today, those mission buildings are considered World Heritage Site. A district called an "alcaldía mayor" was established in San José de Escandón -today in the municipality of Pinal de Amoles- which governed what is now the northern half of the state. Decline of mining in the area would have this seat of government moved to Cadereyta in 1675, but this territory would be joined with the alcaldía mayor of the city of Querétaro to form the modern state.

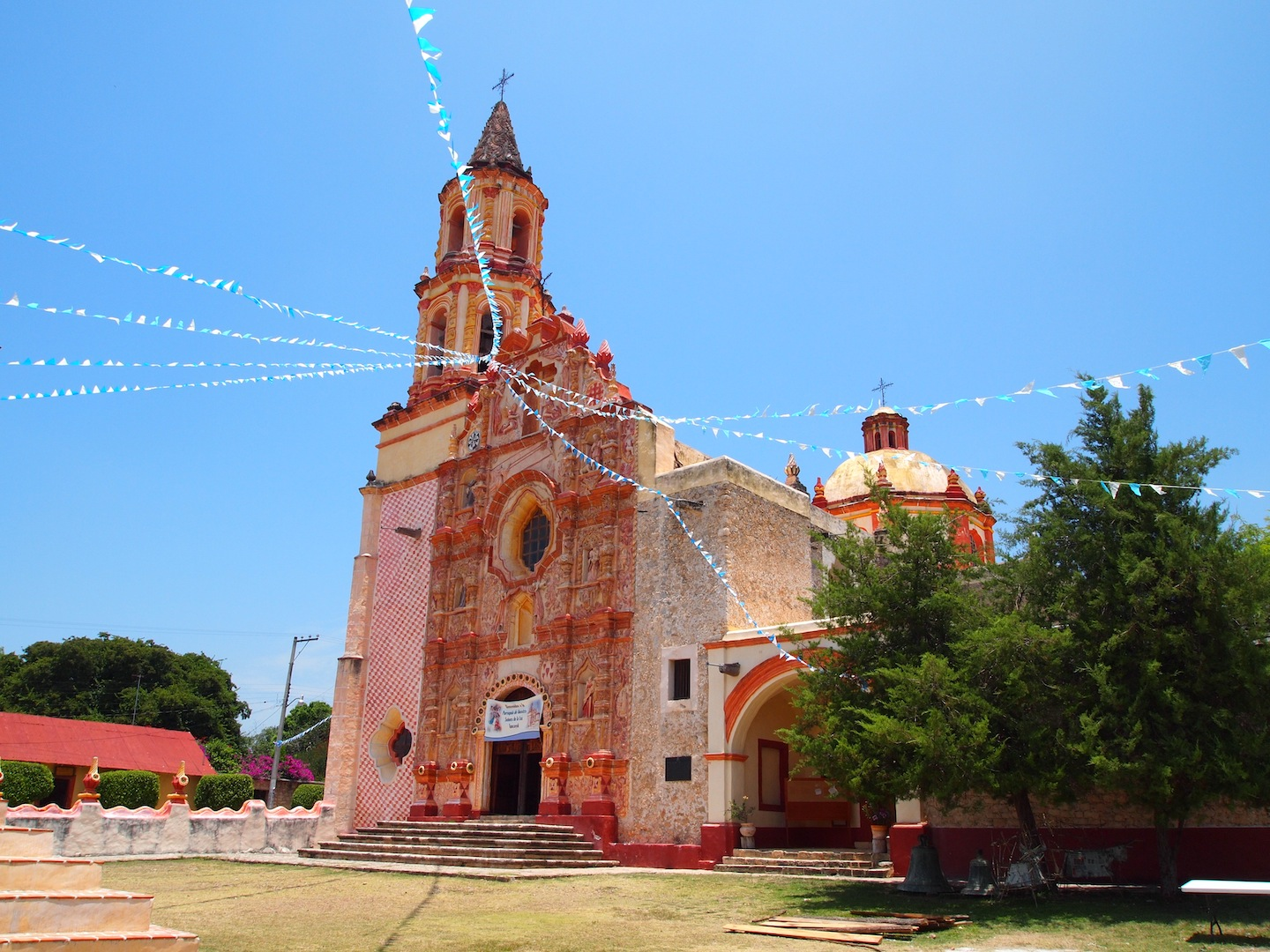
Mission church at Tancoyol

The territory of Querétaro was consolidated during the 17th century. Santiago de Querétaro was declared a city in 1655. The coat of arms granted to the capital city that year is now the state coat of arms, with the substitution of an eagle on a cactus to replace the section referring to the Spanish royalty. Over the colonial period, the Querétaro area became important strategically and economically as it connected the newly explored and conquered lands to the north and west to the center of New Spain in Mexico City. Various trade routes converged here and the city became a cultural crossroads. The activities of Franciscan missionaries were a decisive factor in building the economic, social, political and religious institutions of the state. They were also mostly responsible for the building of most of the religious buildings and the acquisition of paintings and sculptures that can still be seen. These works gave the city an image of richness. The buildings from this era of the city's history include the Plaza de Armas, The Casa de Ecala, the Casa de los Septién, the Cassa de los Samaniego, the Casa de los Fernández de Jáuregui, the Palacio de la Corregiduría de Legres de Querétaro as well as the Congregación and San Antonio churches. However, the most important structure from the time is the Aqueduct of Querétaro. Much of the evangelization efforts in the Sierra Gorda area was done by Junípero Serra. These efforts left behind a number of missions which exist to this day in Jalpan de Serra, Tancoyol, Concá, Tilaco and Landa de Matamoros.

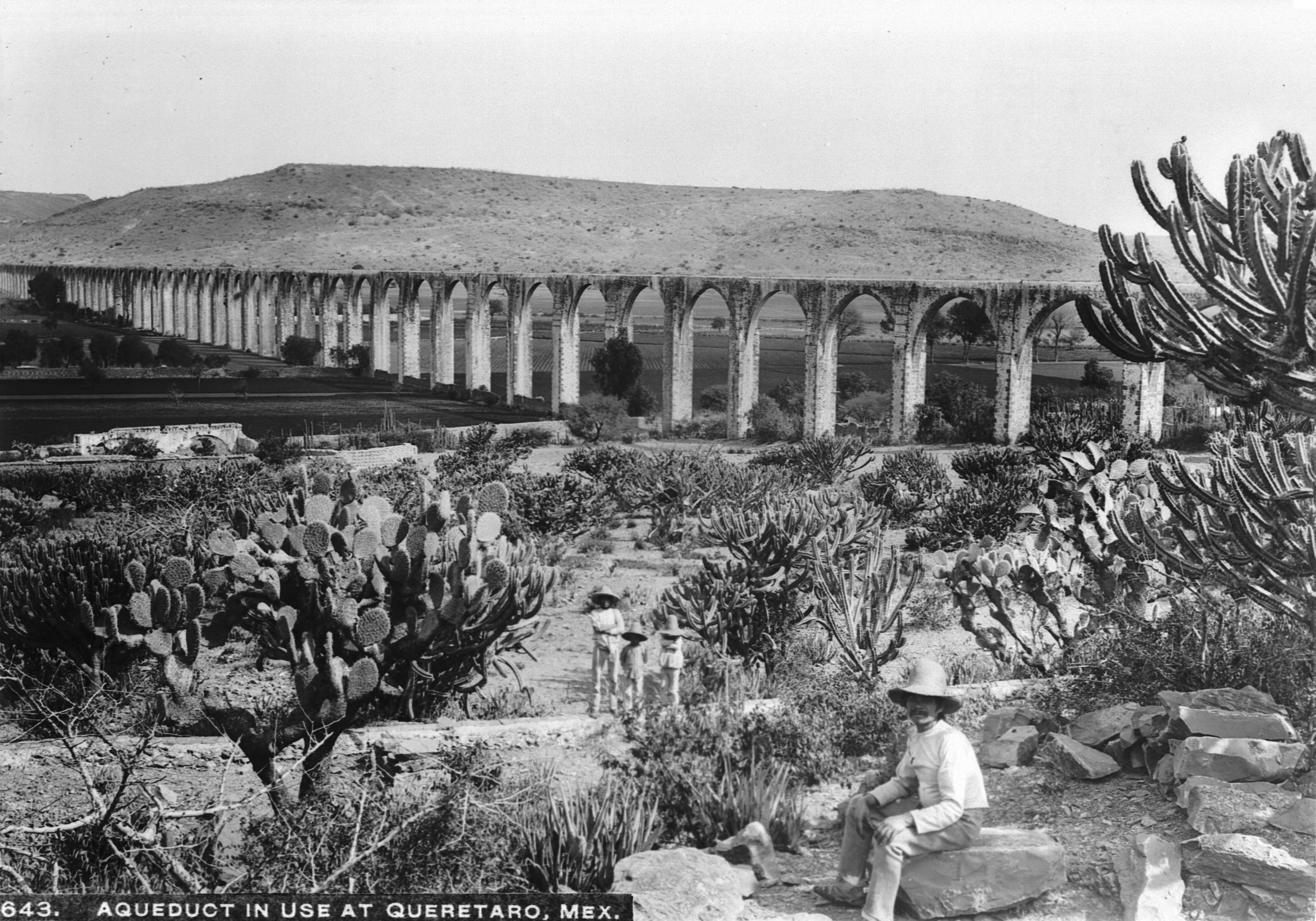
Aqueduct at Querétaro, ca.1905–1910 (CHS-643)

This development made the city wealthy for the rest of the colonial period. Querétaro reached its height of the colonial period during the 18th century due to its strategic position with the northern territories and because of its livestock production. There was also a significant textile industry for local and regional markets. Querétaro was the first major producer of wool cloth in New Spain. At the end of the century, The Real Fabrica de Tabaco (Royal Tobacco Factory) was established, the second most important of its type in New Spain. There was also some mineral production, especially silver in an area called El Doctor.

The city of Querétaro was strategic in the development of events just before the start of the Mexican War of Independence. It was the site of the conspiracy among Miguel Hidalgo y Costilla, Ignacio Allende, Josefa Ortiz de Domínguez and her husband the Corregidor of Querétaro Miguel Domínguez. The plot was uncovered when another conspirator, Epigmenio González, was caught with a stockpile of weapons to start the war. Ortiz de Dominguez sent word to Miguel Hidalgo y Costilla in Dolores, Guanajuato (now Dolores Hidalgo, Guanajuato) that the plot was discovered. At that point, Hidalgo decided to begin the revolt against colonial rule in on 15 September, rather than in December as planned. Gonzalez was imprisoned in the Philippines from 1810 to 1838 for his role. The Corregidor and his wife were caught and imprisoned for their parts as well. Soon after, the city of Querétaro was taken by royalist forces and would stay that way for much of the war. The only fighting in the state were skirmishes fought in the mountain areas. The city of Querétaro would be one of the last royalist bastions to fall.

After the war, Querétaro was made a state with the 1824 Constitution. However, the city and state would lose the economic and cultural prominence that both had enjoyed during the colonial period. The political instability of the 19th century took its toll on commerce, which made the area's economy suffer. The status of Querétaro would change between state and department, depending on whether Liberals or Conservatives were in power nationally. Within the state, battles for power between the two groups would lead to the state having twenty five governors between 1824 and 1855.

During the century, the capital city was the scene of a number of important events. During the Mexican–American War, the capital was moved from Mexico City to Querétaro. At the end of that war, the Treaty of Guadalupe Hidalgo was signed here. The southernmost raids of the Comanche from the plains and prairies of Texas, Oklahoma, and Kansas far to the north (along with Kiowas and some Apaches) occurred here in the middle of the 1800s. The 1857 Constitution was published in the city as well and a coalition of states including Querétaro, Jalisco, Aguascalientes, Zacatecas, Guanajuato and Michoacán formed a coalition to defend this constitution against the Plan of Tacubaya. During the short reign of Maximilian I, there were battles between Liberals and Conservatives (with the latter supporting the emperor) in Querétaro. However, Maximilian lost the military support provided by Napoleon III, leaving only four states loyal to the emperor. Querétaro was one of them. Maximilian still resisted Liberal forces which eventually surrounded him at Cerro de Campanas, then outside the city of Querétaro. The emperor was caught and executed on 19 June 1867. Afterwards, the state wrote a new constitution based on Liberal principles. Another new state constitution would be written at the beginning of the Porfiriato in 1879. Despite the turmoil, there was still economic progress in the state, with the establishment of textile mills such as Hércules, Casa Rubio and two other factories in San Antonio and La Purísima. There was also some mining, especially in El Doctor, Río Blando, Maconí and Escanelilla with a total of 216 mines producing silver with some producing gold, copper, lead and more.

Before the end of the century, modern infrastructure such as electricity, telegraph and telephones began to appear. Industry grew and modernized, with El Hércules becoming the largest textile factory in the country. Haciendas and agricultural production also grew, especially in the north of the state. The capital was modified and expanded, and it was linked to the rest of the country via rail in 1882. Public education began in the state at the beginning of the 20th century with fifty-four primary schools and the first graduates of the state's first teachers' college.

At the same time, strikes and other movements against the Diaz regime had begun in the state and elsewhere in the country. The largest strike in the state was against the El Hércules factory in 1909. At the start of the Mexican Revolution, there were revolts in Jalpan de Serra and Cadereyta along with protests in the capital. Governor González de Cosío resigned in 1911, replaced by Joaquín F. Chicarro, who was allied with Victoriano Huerta and more authoritarian. In 1916 and 1917, the federal government of Venustiano Carranza had to abandon Mexico City, moving the country's capital to Querétaro. The country's current constitution was promulgated from Teatro de la República in the city of Querétaro.

After the war, the economy of the state recovered slowly. Between 1940 and 1960, economic progress came more rapidly, with the industrial infrastructure growing and modernizing. During the same period, the population grew substantially as well. Much of industrial growth from then to the present can be seen in the various industrial parks located north of the capital city. In the following thirty years, the city grew to over four times its previous size. However, the state conserved the city's historic center, which was declared a World Heritage Site in 1996. The city's official name, which had been changed simply to "Querétaro", was restored to "Santiago de Querétaro" the same year.

In 1997, the National Action Party (PAN) won the gubernatorial elections and Ignacio Loyola Vera became the first non PRI governor of the state since the Revolution. In 2008, the state's constitution was amended to make Querétaro the official state name. The aqueduct Acueducto II was inaugurated in 2011 by President Felipe Calderón and state governor José Calzada Rovirosa. It transports water over 122 km from springs in El Infiernillo to the city of Querétaro. This is to supplement local water sources which are no longer able to meet the city's needs.

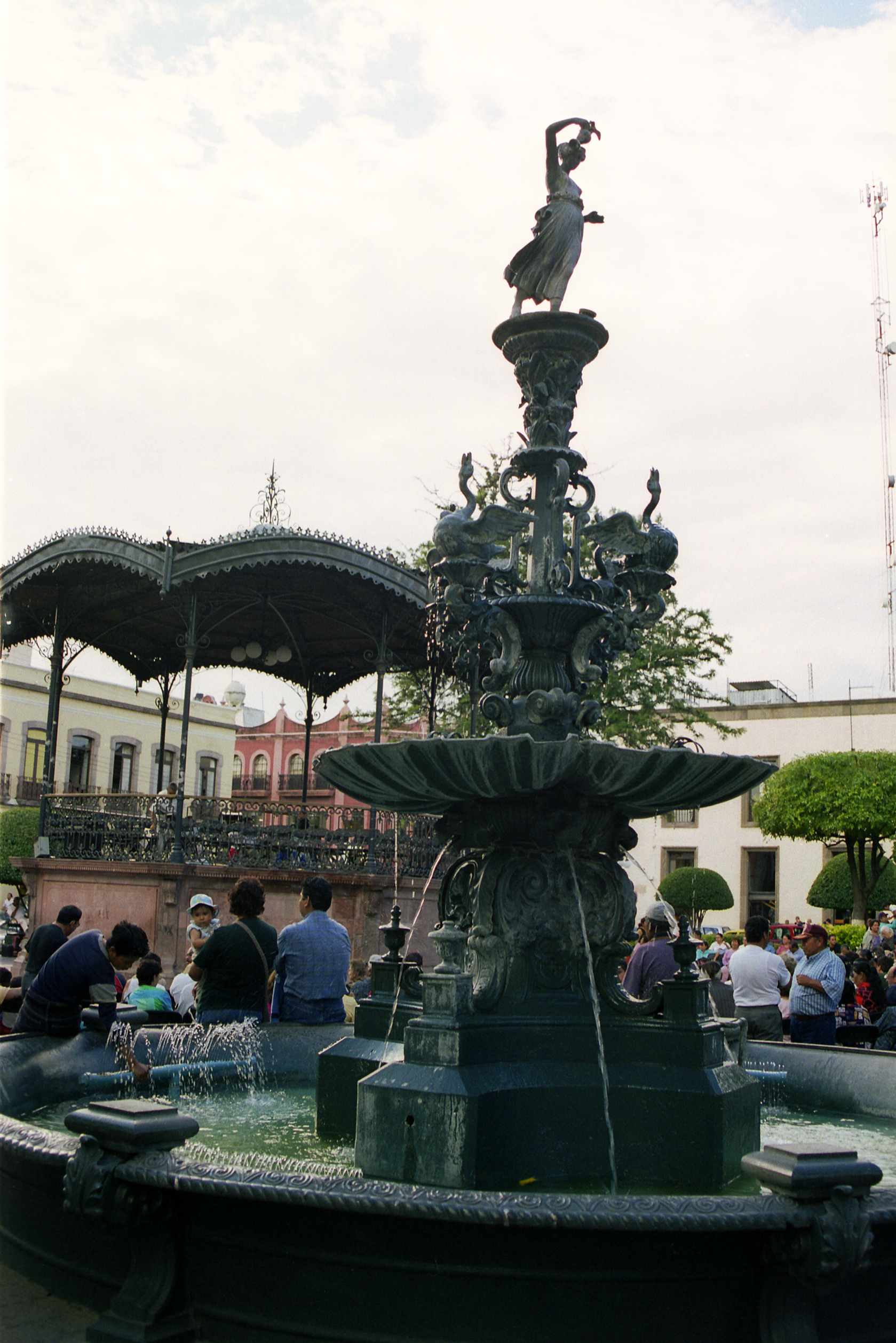
A fountain in Querétaro zocalo designed by Gustav Eiffel

== Economy ==
=== General description ===
Economic activity in the state is closely tied to trends at the national level. This includes the declining contribution to GDP of the agricultural sector and an increase in manufacturing and commerce/services. The city of Querétaro is by far the most important economic center in the state, followed by San Juan del Río. Not only is Querétaro the population center of the state, it has high-quality soil for irrigation farming and cattle. It is directly connected by highway to Mexico City, the country's largest market, as well as the north of the country and the United States. This makes the city an almost obligatory stop for most people and goods traveling north and south. This geographical advantage has spurred industrial development in the state, especially since the 1970s. Another advantage the state has is its stable social and political situation. It has a low crime rate and also noted by NGO Transparencia Mexicana as having the lowest levels of corruption among all of Mexico's states. Of the three main sectors of the economy: agriculture, mining/industry and commerce/services, the percentage each employs and contributes to the GDP varies significantly from municipality to municipality, with agriculture making up a higher percentage of local employment and GDP in rural municipalities than in the Querétaro metropolitan area. However, overall, the state has one of the country's strongest economies. Government authorities report an increase of 4,602 jobs in the state for January 2011, accounting for a quarter of the gain for the country. Some related to Bombardier.

The municipalities of the state are grouped into five economic regions centered on Amealco de Bonfil, Cadereyta de Montes, Jalpan de Serra, Querétaro and San Juan del Río. The Amealco region includes this municipality and the municipality of Huimilpan. Most of its economy is based on cereal production with only minor industry such as maquiladoras and textiles. There are also handcrafts produced by indigenous groups.

The Cadereyta región includes this municipality, Colón, Peñamiller and Tolimán. Agriculture is limited to the rainy season, but there is significant production of livestock such as goats. There is also some forestry activity. Industry is not common, but some technically advanced factories exist. There are also maquiladoras, textile and recycling operations which primarily employ women.

The Jalpan de Serra region includes this municipality and Arroyo Seco, Pinal de Amoles, Landa de Matamoros and San Joaquín. Agriculture is limited, mostly producing fruits such as citrus, mangos, coffee, peaches and apples. Fish farming is a growing and promising enterprise for the areas. Industry is also very limited.

The Querétaro región includes the capital and the municipalities of Corregidora and El Marqués. This area has the second most productive farms in the state, much of which is irrigated. Crops include sorghum, wheat, barley, alfalfa, oats with some vegetables, corn and beans. This area is also an important producer of all kinds of livestock. Industry is limited to the industrial parks located just north of the capital, but they employ most of the industrial workers of the state.

The San Juan del Río region includes this municipality and Ezequiel Montes, Pedro Escobedo and Tequisquiapan. This is the most agriculturally production region of the state, with most farmland irrigated. There is intensive farming of sorghum, wheat, barley, alfalfa, and oats, with some vegetables, corn and beans. Large areas of natural pasture supports a large livestock industry. The region is second in industry behind Querétaro, concentrating on paper products and food processing. Most industry is located in San Juan del Río.

=== Agriculture and forestry ===
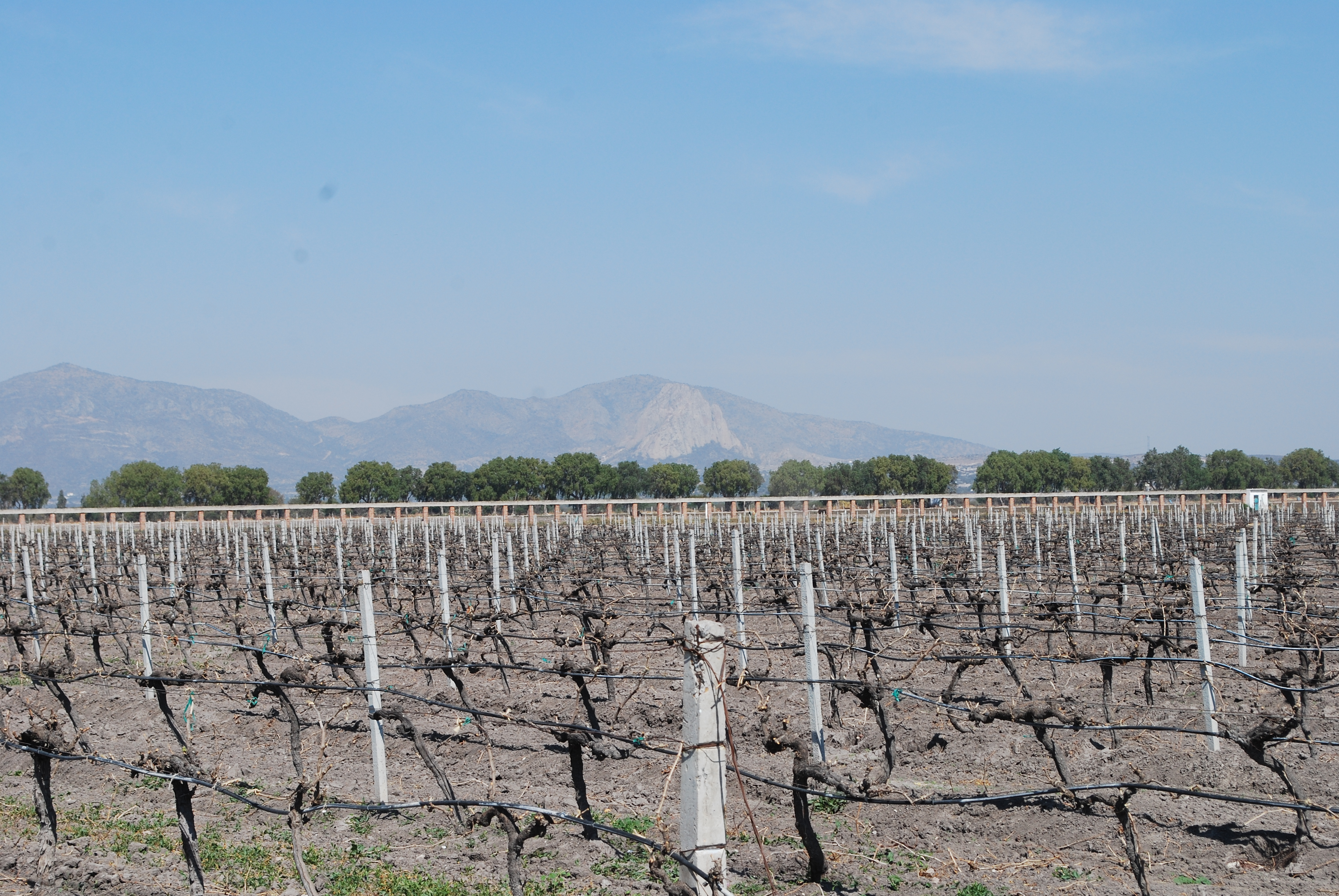
Vineyard belonging to Cavas Freixenet in Ezequiel Montes

Agriculture and livestock have been traditionally important for the state, and while it only provides about four percent of the state's GDP, down from eighteen percent in 1970, it employs a far larger percentage of the population, with it being the basis of the economy in many rural areas. 28.24% of state land is used for agriculture, mostly raising corn, wheat, alfalfa, sorghum and squash. There is also intensive farming in areas of a number of important crops. Much of the large scale farming is irrigated and is supported in part by the state government, with loans and help with infrastructure such as water and roads. However, most farmland is seasonal, meaning it is worked only during the rainy season. Grains such as barley, wheat, oats and alfalfa are almost exclusively planted on irrigated land along with certain vegetables such as broccoli, garlic, carrots, lettuce, onions and cauliflower. Most nonirrigated land is planted with corn, followed by beans mostly for auto or local consumption. Leading cash crops are beans, cabbage, alfalfa, onions, lettuce and sorghum.

Within agriculture, production of crops has decreased while the production of animal products has increased. Crops as a percentage of agricultural production dropped from 34% in 1988 to 25.8% in 1993. One of the leading milk producers in the country, Querétaro farms also breed livestock and dairy cows. Livestock production is important and growing, mostly consisting of cattle, pigs, sheep, goats, horses and domestic fowl. Querétaro is one of the top producers of chicken in Mexico. The largest producers of livestock in the state are Jalpan, Cadereyta, San Juan del Río and Querétaro.

Forest land is one of the state's two main natural resources. These forests contain commercial species such as pine, oak, cedar, juniper, mesquite and more. Most of these are found in and around the Sierra Gorda area. There is about 70,000 hectares of possible productive land but only 17,000 have been studied for management. Land actively involved in forestry operations equals 9,358m2, most of which is in the municipalities of Landa de Matamoros and Amealco de Bonfil. 20.7% is used for grazing. 24.22% is forest; 3.95% is rainforest and 40.62 is arid scrub brush.

=== Mining and industry ===
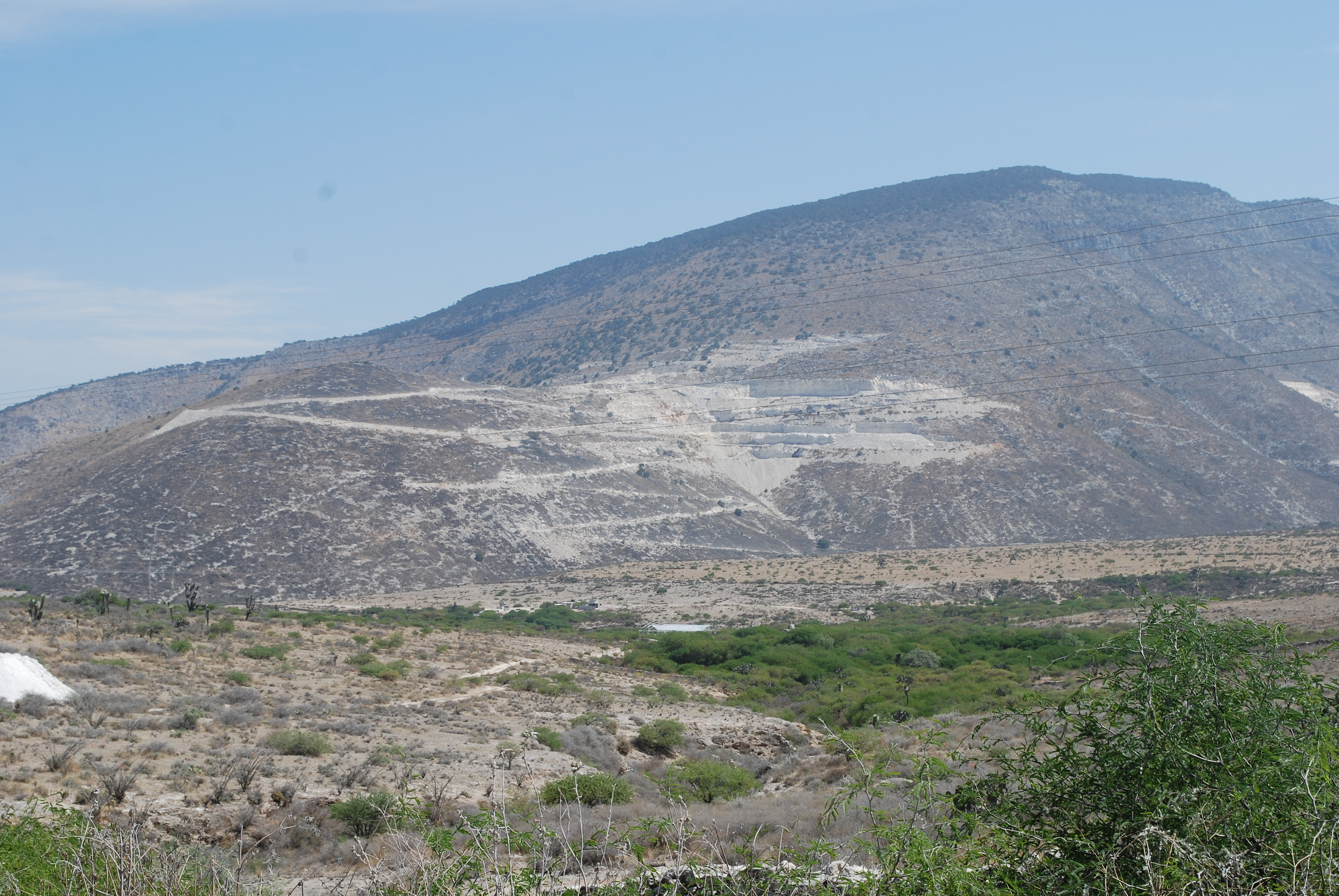
Mine in Vizarrón

Mining, manufacturing and construction accounts for about 39% of the GDP, with manufacturing alone accounting for 32%. This has remained steady for the past few decades. Minerals are one of the state's two main natural resources. Mining is a traditional economic activity for the state. There are ten mining districts in the Sierra Gorda alone producing lead, silver, zinc, copper, gold, mercury and antimony. Nonmetallic products include marble, kaolin, sandstone, and more. Opals are a distinctive state resource. State and local governments, in partnership with private industry, actively promote foreign investment into the region. The priority of the state government is to encourage industries which use low levels of water for environmental reasons. These have mostly been auto parts, food processing and electronics. Other major industries include chemicals, plastics, textiles, paper products and printing and wood products. Most are micro- and small-sized operations.

Querétaro's major cities are home to industrial complexes that produce machinery and other metallic products, chemicals and processed foods. However, most of the state's manufacturing companies are located in or around the city of Querétaro. Carnation and Purina are among the best-known food processing companies with facilities in the state, and numerous textile mills manufacture clothing made of wool, cotton and henequen. One of the biggest employers is Tremec, an auto parts manufacturer. Currently, there are 392 companies with direct foreign investment and 238 exporting companies that have located in the state. Exports in 2002 totaled US$3.35 billion, and direct investment in 2003 reached US$169 million. Many of these companies are headquartered in modern industrial parks, one of the newest and most technologically advanced being El Marques Industrial Park. This facility was inaugurated in 2003, with an initial investment of US$13 million. The park occupies a space of 274 acres (1.11 km^{2}) with international tenants from Italy, Germany, Spain, the US, Taiwan as well as Mexico representing real estate, automotive, carton packing, food processing and some high tech enterprises. One of these tenants is Siemens whose 4,000 sq ft (370 m^{2}) plant is dedicated to manufacturing equipment for high voltage systems.

The city of Querétaro has become the most advanced center of the aeronautics industry in Mexico, anchored by a plant belonging to Canadian conglomerate Bombardier, which opened in 2005. This plant manufactures fuselages and electrical systems, recently adding wing production for the Learjet 85, a nonmetallic plane. This plant is the largest of the 189 aeronautics facilities in Mexico, employing about 2,000 people. There are eight other aeronautics enterprises located in the state.

The state is known for dairy products and wine. Two of Querétaro's cities, San Juan del Río and Ezequiel Montes, have thriving vinicultures. Some of the best comes from the Rancho Santa Marina just to the south of the capital in the municipality of El Marqués. This ranch specializes in sheep milk cheese such as feta, ricotta, picodon and criollo/crottin. Rancho Hondonada is another reputable producer as well as Quesos Vai, which specializes in Mexican cheeses such as Oaxaca and panela. The best known winery is Freixenet which is on the highway between Tequisquiapan and San Juan del Río. The 45-hectare vineyard grows four varieties of grapes: Saint Emilion, Macabeu, Sauvignon Blanc and Pinot Noir. A cave 25 meters (82 ft) below ground maintains a constant and ideal climate for wine cellaring. Other producers include La Redonda and Rancho Los Azteca.

=== Traditional handcrafts ===
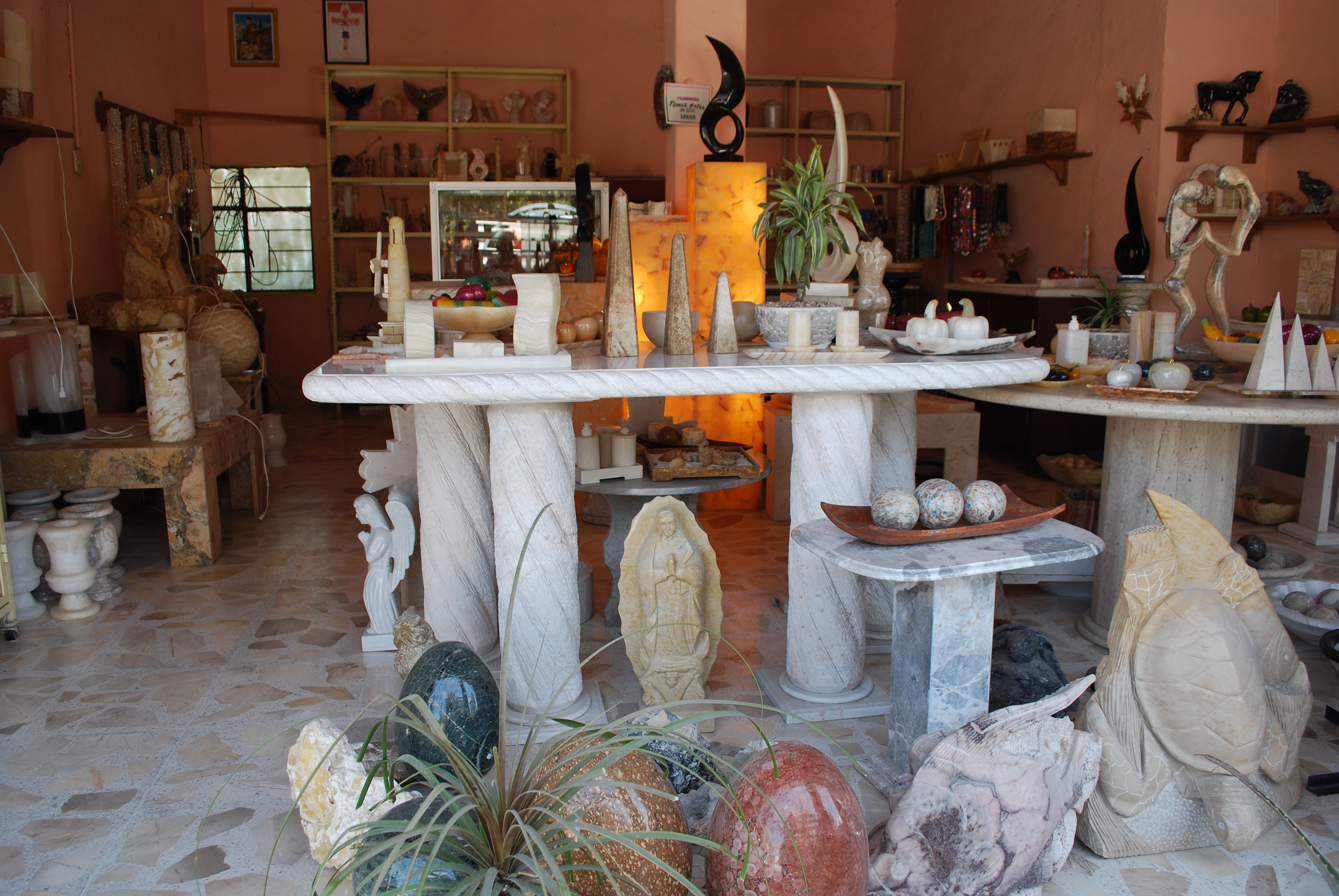
Marble objects at a shop in Vizarrón

Handcrafts produced in the state include baskets, textiles, metal objects, pottery and items made from wood, leather and paper. Basket making is common in many parts of the state, and similar fibers are also used to create hats, decorative items and more made from various materials such as reed, willow branches and palm fronds. In Jalpan de Serra, they make various items from palm fronds such as bags, hats and mats. Fine woven hats can be found in Tequisquiapan as well as baskets made with a variety of willow. Baskets are made in San Juan del Río as well as in Cadereyta with willow and with reeds. Basket making and rope are made in most areas of the state. In Ezequiel Montes, ixtle fiber is used to make sisal and rope. In Peñamiller henequen is used. In San Juan del Río reeds are used to make baskets. In Tolimán, furniture and more is made with willow branches. Tequisquiapan makes crafts with rattan, roots, juniper and pine branches along with ixtle.

Tolimán is known for its traditional clothing, especially quexquemetls made of silk and embroidered with colored thread for men and quexquemetls made of cotton for women. The ones made here are the largest in the country, made on backstrap looms. They also weave and embroider bags and linens such as tablecloths and napkins. Another area for traditional Otomi dress is Amealco de Bonfil, where blouses, skirts and more are embroidered with designs from this ethnicity. They also make cloth dolls dressed in traditional clothing. In Tolimán, Pame influence is noted in the textiles, which are mostly woven to make tablecloths and napkins. Colón, Cadereyta and Bernal are known for items made of wool which has been naturally dyed, such as rebozos, blankets and more.

Sculpting and building with sandstone is a major business and craft due to the material's abundance in the mountains. Various types of sculptures as well as building blocks are created from it. In the communities of Escolásticas and Ejido de Ajuchitlancito in the Pedro Escobedo municipality, families, associations and cooperatives work with the stone. The work from Pedro Escobedo has been exported for many years. Various communities in the Huimilpan municipality do as well. The items create range from ashtrays to large columns for buildings. Much of the stonework of La Cañada in the El Marqués municipality is exported. Another stone that is worked is marble, especially in Vizarrón in Cadereyta municipality and in Tequisquiapan. Onyx, marble, opal and turquoise are worked in San Juan del Río and in the capital city. Opals are mined in the state and come in a variety of colors and sizes. They are mostly made into jewelry.

There are various communities in the state which specialize in pottery. Products include every day utensils and cookware to architectural elements, figures and sculptures. The clay from Cadereyta is valued for its quality. In the community of San Juan de Guedío in the municipality of Amealco they specialized in storage containers as well as the figures of saints and those for nativity scenes. Other areas noted for their pottery are Colón and Ezequiel de Montes.

Other items are made from materials such as wood, leather and paper. Wood items include furniture, toys and musical instruments, especially guitars and violins and include miniature musical instruments, which are made in San Joaquín. Leather is fashioned into belts, pistol holders, handbags, wallets and cowboy boots. These are mostly available in CadereytaLanda de Matamoros and San Vicente Ferrer in the municipality of El Marqués. Cardboard is used to fashion masks and items related to mojiganga theater mostly for use in parades and traditional festivals. Mojiganga figures are made with a reed frame to which the cardboard is applied. Bernal is noted for its masks made of paper and plaster which are often molded. In the city of Querétaro they make masks and mojiganga items, as well as large paper sculptures such as the Judas figures, which are burned.

=== Commerce, services and tourism ===
Commerce, services and tourism accounts for 57% of the state's GDP, led by commerce at 19% and services at 18% both related and not to tourism. This is an increase from 45% in 1970. Since the 1990s, the state has promoted its tourism industry, with attendance at international forums, and building of hotels and other infrastructure. The Centro de Congresos (Convention Center) of Querétaro was inaugurated in 2011 to attract more business travel to the state. The facility contains ten halls, with a capacity of 9,000 people.

There are two areas declared as historic monuments by the Mexican federal government, the historic center of Querétaro and the historic center of San Juan del Río. The historic center of Querétaro has been declared a World Heritage Site by UNESCO. Most historic and cultural attractions are located in the capital. Museums include the Museo de Arte de Querétaro, the Museo Regional de Querétaro, the Museo de la Ciudad, the Museo del Sitio de Querétaro and Museo de la Matemática. Outside of the capital, there are the Museo Histórico de la Sierra Gorda, Museo Arqueológico y Minero de la Sierra and the Museo de la Muerte in San Juan del Río. Another major attraction is its 74-arched aqueduct built in the early 1700s. The aqueduct rises 23 meters (75 ft) above street level and conveyed drinking water to the city from regional springs until 1970. The founding of the city of Querétaro is celebrated in July with various cultural and gastronomic events. Conchero dancers go in procession to the La Cruz Church to commemorate the appearance of Saint James.

Querétaro has a number of areas which lend themselves to ecotourism. One area especially promoted is the Sierra Gorda region. The area is a complex of canyons and mountains extending over 400,000 hectares with a well conserved biological diversity. In the deep canyons there are grottos, valleys, ravines and arroyos. In the higher areas there are forests of pines and holm oak, and tropical forests in the lower elevations. The area was declared a biological reserve and contains about 1,700 species of plants, some endemic only to the area. There are also 360 species of birds, 130 of mammals, and just over 100 of amphibians and reptiles. A number of these are in danger of extinction such as macaws, the black bear, the porcupine and the spider monkey.

The state promotes its wine and cheeses with a Ruta del Vino or Wine Route. This connects three major wineries, Freixenet, La Redonda and Los Aztecas, along with various cheese producing facilities and some small towns chosen for their charm, such as Tequisquiapan and Bernal. There is also a Cheese and Wine Museum. At the wineries, one can observe how the product is made, which includes both sparkling and normal wines. The cheese producers make their products from goats', cows' and sheep's milk, and in the two villages, one can enjoy both wine and cheese at the same time. At the end of July and the beginning of August, there is the first harvest, called the Vendimia. At the end of May and beginning of June, Tequisquiapan hosts the National Cheese and Wine Fair. The Feria del Queso y el Vino (Cheese and Wine Fair) is held at the end of may and beginning of June in Tequisquiapan featuring wine producers from various parts of the world. Grape harvest festivals are held at Freixenet and La Redonda at the end of June.

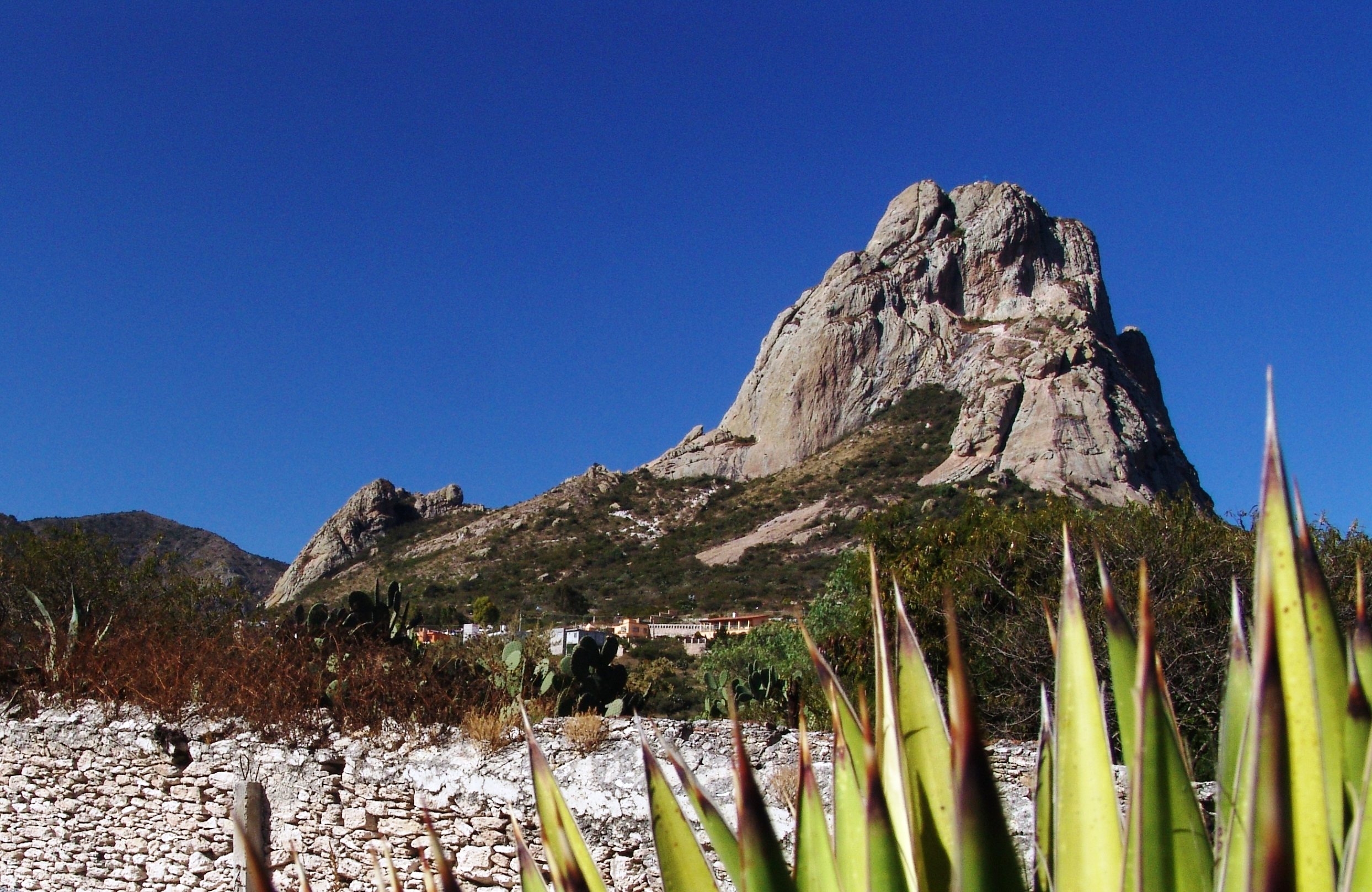
Peña de Bernal

Querétaro has one Pueblo Mágico, San Sebastián Bernal. It is best known as the home of the Peña de Bernal, the third largest monolith in the world after the Rock of Gibraltar and Sugarloaf Mountain in Rio de Janeiro. It was considered sacred by the Chichimeca and dates back to the Jurassic Period more than 100 million years ago. The community was originally occupied by the Otomi. Many colonial structures in the town of sandstone have survived to the present day. It also was a scene of a battle during the French intervention in Mexico . The El Cerrito pyramid is here climbed by those dressed in White for the spring equinox. Today, tourism is an important part of the area's economy, attracting both those interested in history and those interested in ecotourism activities.

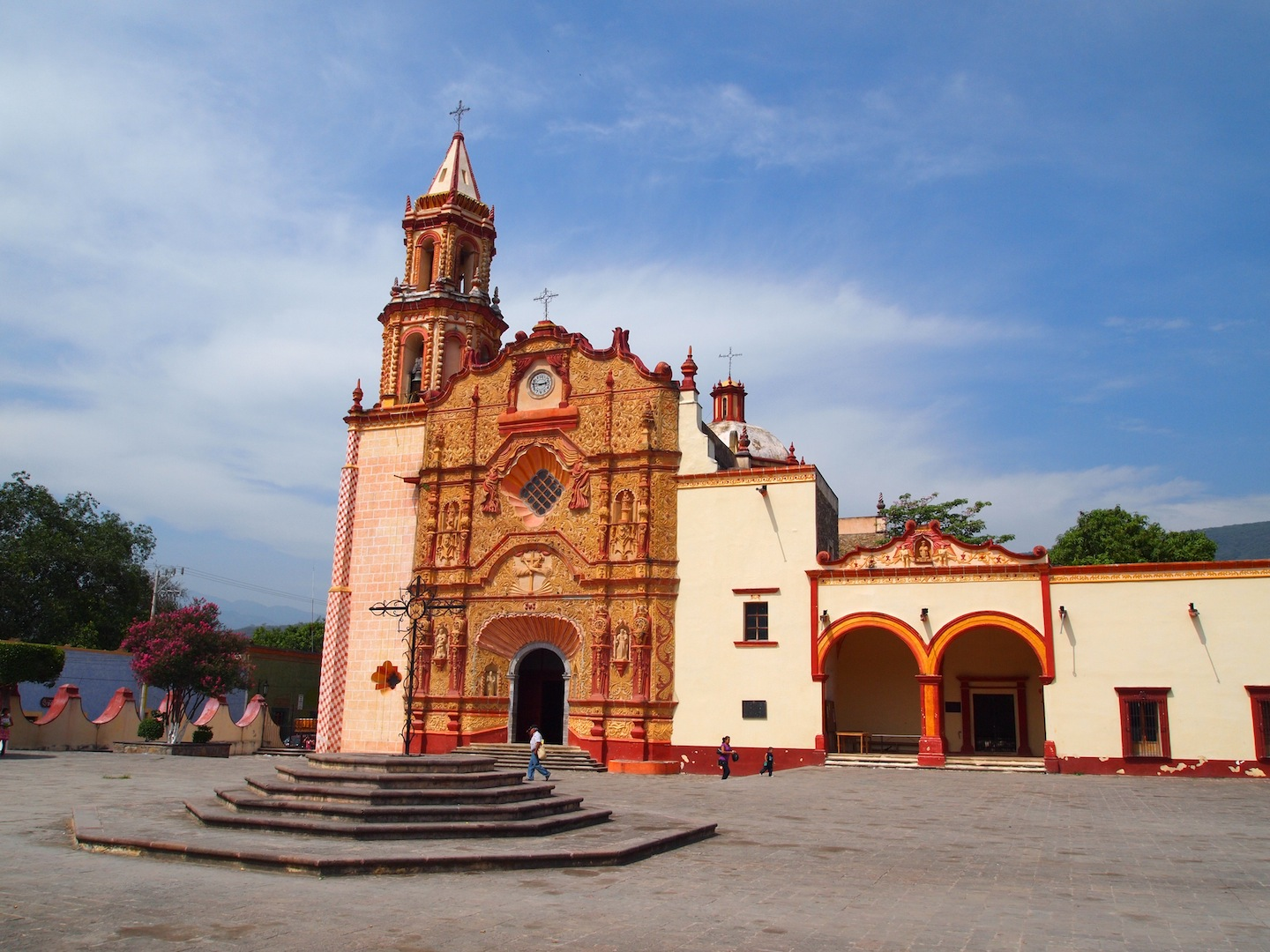
Mission church at Jalpan de Serra

In addition, there are a number of old haciendas which have been converted into hotels, spas and other recreational facilities. The Juriquilla Hacienda is one of nine haciendas which dominated the municipality of San Rosa. The largest was Juriquilla, founded in 1707. In the 19th century, it belonged to Timoteo Fernando de Jaurgui and later to a number of entrepreneurial families. Since 1993, the main house has been converted into a 196 room hotel, maintaining the buildings colonial architecture. The best conserved structure is the hacienda chapel. The Jurica Hacienda is known for its freshwater springs. The main house is a hotel with 182 rooms. The former chapel is intact, all original except the flooring. The Galindo Hacienda was converted into a hotel and restore in the 1970s after decades of abandonment. The San Gil Hacienda is traditionally said to have been a property of La Malinche. Today it is a hotel and spa surrounding the original gardens of the main house. The La Venta Hacienda has its origins in the late 16th century as a land grant to Baltasar de Salazar to build lodgings for those traveling to the unexplored northern lands. It is the smallest of the hacienda resorts with only 51 rooms in its hotel.

The state has a number of colonial era missions, mostly in the Sierra Gorda region. The early ones were founded by the Augustinians and Franciscans with the aim of evangelizing of the area, but they were shut down soon after their founding by the hostility of the Chichimeca. Most were unfinished and/or destroyed. The first successful missionary in the area was Jesuit Junípero Serra because colonial authorities began to militarily control the area. The best known is Bucareli Mission in Pinal de Amoles founded in 1797. Other missions are found including Santiago de Jalpan, San Miguel Concá, Santa María del Agua de Landa, San Francisco del Valle de Tilacoal and Nuestra Señora de la Luz de Tancoyol, all established in the 1750s and 1760s. After restoration efforts between 1979 and 2002, there have been efforts to register these missions as a World Heritage Site.

== Education ==
Basic Education is defined as the levels from preschool to middle school and includes other types of education such as special education, indigenous schools, bilingual school and adult remedial education. The state contains nearly 2,000 schools at this level including 1,225 preschools, 1,392 primary schools and 364 middle schools. Education Media Superior includes high schools, vocational schools and technical schools for those who graduate middle school. There are 115 campuses of this type located in all the municipalities of the state, but it covers less than 80% of the demand for this kind of education. The average number of years of schooling in the state is 7.5 years, meaning the completion of primary school and a little over a year in middle school. Levels of schooling increase with younger generations, with nearly all under 5 attending preschool before primary school. Nearly all children of age attend and finish primary school, and nearly all of these begin middle school. However, 8.8% of the population fifteen and older have not enrolled in school at all. 19% have completed primary, 27.2% have completed at least middle school/technical school, 17.9% have completed high school and 14.5 have gone onto higher education.

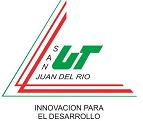
Logo of the Universidad Tecnológico de San Juan del Río

The state's cultural and educational center is the capital, with a variety of universities, technological schools and institutes of higher technical studies, with include. These institutions supply highly trained graduates for the work force. This is one factor that contributes to the higher socioeconomic level of the state. University level education has been the fastest growing level, with the most recent additions being the Universidad Tecnológica de San Juan del Río and the Instituto Tecnológico de Querétaro, Jalpan Campus. In total, there are twenty two public and private institutions. These include the Universidad Autónoma de Querétaro with 43 bachelors, 36 masters and ten doctorate programs, the Instituto Tecnológico de Querétaro with eight bachelors and two masters programs, ITESM-Querétaro with 23 bachelors and seven masters programs, the Universidad Pedagógica Nacional with 19 bachelors programs and the Universidad del Valle de México with 18 bachelors and two masters programs. Other institutions include the Universidad Internacional de México, Universidad Cuauhtémoc, Universidad Contemporánea (UCO), Universidad Mesoamericana, CUMDES, campus Corregidora, Escuela Normal del Estado, Escuela Normal de Jalpan, Escuela Normal Superior, Escuela Normal Queretana, Instituto 5 de Mayo, Normal Instituto la Paz de Querétaro, Universidad Tecnológica del Estado de Querétaro, Centro Interdisciplinario de Investigación y Docencia en Educación Técnica, Instituto Nacional de Bellas Artes (INBA), Conservatorio Libre de Música "J. Guadalupe Velázquez" and Centro Nacional de Danza Contemporánea. These together cover about eighty percent of the demand for education at this level.

The state university is the Universidad Autónoma de Querétaro. Its origins are in two colonial era colleges of San Ignacio and San Francisco Javier. These were Jesuit colleges established at the urging of Vasco de Quiroga. The first, San Ignacio, was established in 1625. The two were run by the Jesuits until they were expelled from New Spain in 1767. From then until 1832, the schools were run by regular clergy. The two were converged and reorganized into the State Civil College in 1868 and operated as such until 1950. This college was closed and reorganized again to open as the current institution.

The Universidad Tecnológica de Querétaro (UTEQ) was founded in 1994 with 146 students with majors in Administration, Business, Industrial Maintenance and Production Processes. The first classes were taught in rented as facilities were being built on a 25 hectare campus in Colonia San Pedrito Peñuelas. Today the school has eight majors at the undergraduate level.

The Instituto Tecnológico de Querétaro is part of the National System of Technological Institutes in Mexico. It was founded in 1967, and today it offers six engineering majors and technical training in electrical items, machines and automotive.

There are also thirty one research centers with the most prominent being: el Instituto de Ciencias de la Tierra de la UNAM, Campus Juriquilla, Centro Nacional de Investigación en Fisiología y Mejoramiento Animal (CENIF-MAI), CIATEQ, A.C. (Centro de Investigación y Asistencia Técnica del Estado de Querétaro - CIATEQ), Centro Interdisciplinario de Investigación y Docencia en Educación Técnica (CIIDET), Instituto Mexicano del Transporte (IMT), Centro de Investigación y Desarrollo Tecnológico en Electroquímica del Estado (CIDETEQ), Laboratorio de Materiales Unidad Querétaro del CINESTAV-I.P.N., Centro de Neurobiología, Instituto Tecnológico de Querétaro, Instituto Tecnológico y de Estudios Superiores de Monterrey, Campus Querétaro (ITESM), Centro de Investigación y Desarrollo Condumex, Transmisiones y Equipos Mecánicos (TREMEC), Centro Queretano de Recursos Naturales (CQRN), Centro de Ingeniería y Desarrollo Industrial (CIDESI), MABE Tecnología y Desarrollo, Instituto Nacional de Investigaciones Forestales y Agropecuarias (INIFAP), Instituto de Física UNAM, Escuela Normal del Estado de Querétaro "Andrés Balvanera" (ENEQ) and the Centro de Investigación en Ciencia Aplicada y Tecnología Avanzada I.P.N. (CICATA).

A number of these facilities support manufacturing and other industrial sectors of the economy. This also permits partnerships and alliances. One of the most important research center in the state is the National Metrology Center (CENAM), which is a dependency of the Secretariat of Economy. The main function of the center is to bring together science and technology to support the country's economy. It is the second most important of its kind in the Americas.

In December 2013, Arkansas State University in Jonesboro, Arkansas announced the construction of an ASU Campus in Querétaro. The school is said to be the first "american-style" campus in Latin America, meaning students will be able to live on-campus, instead of having to commute from home to class. Construction began in February 2014. While classes were originally expected to start in July 2015, due to infrastructure issues (e.g., water and power), the opening has been rescheduled for 2016. Plans for the school include dorms, a library, student resource centers, and sports complexes. The campus is set to open in 2017 with 1,000 students. Whether or not the school will field intercollegiate athletics teams or if the complexes are for student recreational use is unclear.

== Transportation and communications ==
=== Transport ===
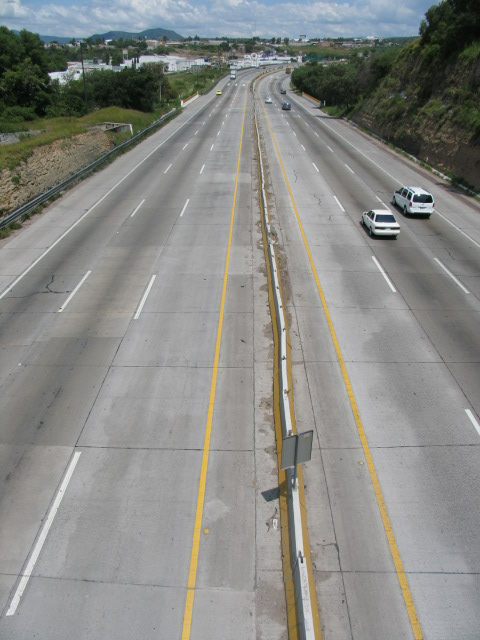
Highway 57 in Querétaro

The state has a total of 3,349.5 km of highways, almost all of which is paved. 571 km of this is federal highway, 880.90 is state highway and 1,885.70 are rural roads. This includes a section of the Pan American Highway. The highway system centers on the capital and connects the state with Mexico City, Guadalajara, Ciudad Valles and north to Ciudad Juárez and the United States. Much of the rural highway infrastructure, especially in the Sierra Gorda area, is for the benefit of mining, agriculture and forestry. The most important of the interstate roads links the state with Mexico City metropolitan area and its market of 20 million people as well as 25 other million customers within 200 miles (320 km). The US border is a nine-hour drive. To support the international transportation of goods, Querétaro has an inner customs office that facilitates the shipment of manufactured products to foreign countries. However, the highway system is most concentrated in the municipalities of Querétaro and San Juan del Río and the corridor in between. Fifty five percent of the traffic along this corridor begins or terminates within the state.

Other infrastructure includes water systems, public buses, rail lines, an international airport and radio and television stations. Most of the irrigation and water-storage areas are also concentrated in the Querétaro and San Juan del Rio municipalities. The capital is home to the state's largest public bus terminal called the Terminal de Autobuses de Querétaro. This station is a transfer point for many who travel north or south in the country. Other major terminals exist in Colón, Tequisquiapan, Jalpan de Serra, San Juan del Río, Cadereyta and Amealco de Bonfil. The state has 338.9 km of rail line, much the same as it had when they were initially built in the early 20th century. They mostly carry freight and connect the cities of San Juan del Río, Tequisquiapan, Pedro Escobedo, Querétaro, Colón and El Marqués. The Querétaro Intercontinental Airport began operations in 2004, replacing the older Ing. Fernando Espinosa Gutierrez Airport. Located in the capital, the facility handles both cargo and passengers.

=== Media ===
The state has twenty radio stations, seventeen of which are commercial enterprises. Stations include XHUAQ, XHORT, XHOZ, XHOE, XHQTO, XHMQ, XHJHS, XHZQ, XHRQ, XEUAQ, XEQG, XEKH, XEXE, XWGV, XEQUE, XEJX, XEHY and XENA. Television stations are mostly repeaters of national channels such as Televisa and Azteca. Televisa has a local operation called Televisora Queretana. Only TV Q is a fully local station. Cable television for the state is provided by Cablecom, Megacable.

Major newspapers and magazines include Noticias, Diario de Querétaro, Sol de San Juan, Financiero Regional, Nuevo Amanecer, Futuro de Querétaro, Para Comentar, Nuevo Milenio, Rotativo, Año 2000, Mundo de Querétaro, Agora, Cabañuelas, El Imparcial, El Informador, Mass, Magazine, Reporte (Q), Rincones Queretanos, Radar and El Informador de Santa Rosa Jáuregui.

== Government ==
The state government is divided into the Legislative, Judicial and Executive branches under Article 23 of the state constitution. The executive branch is headed by the governor, under whom are a number of agencies, including the state secretary and the state attorney general. The Legislature is unicameral made up of representatives popularly elected in districts of the state. This legislature has a number of committees tasked with certain types of legislation. The Judiciary consists of a state supreme court and a system of various lower courts.

== Archaeology ==
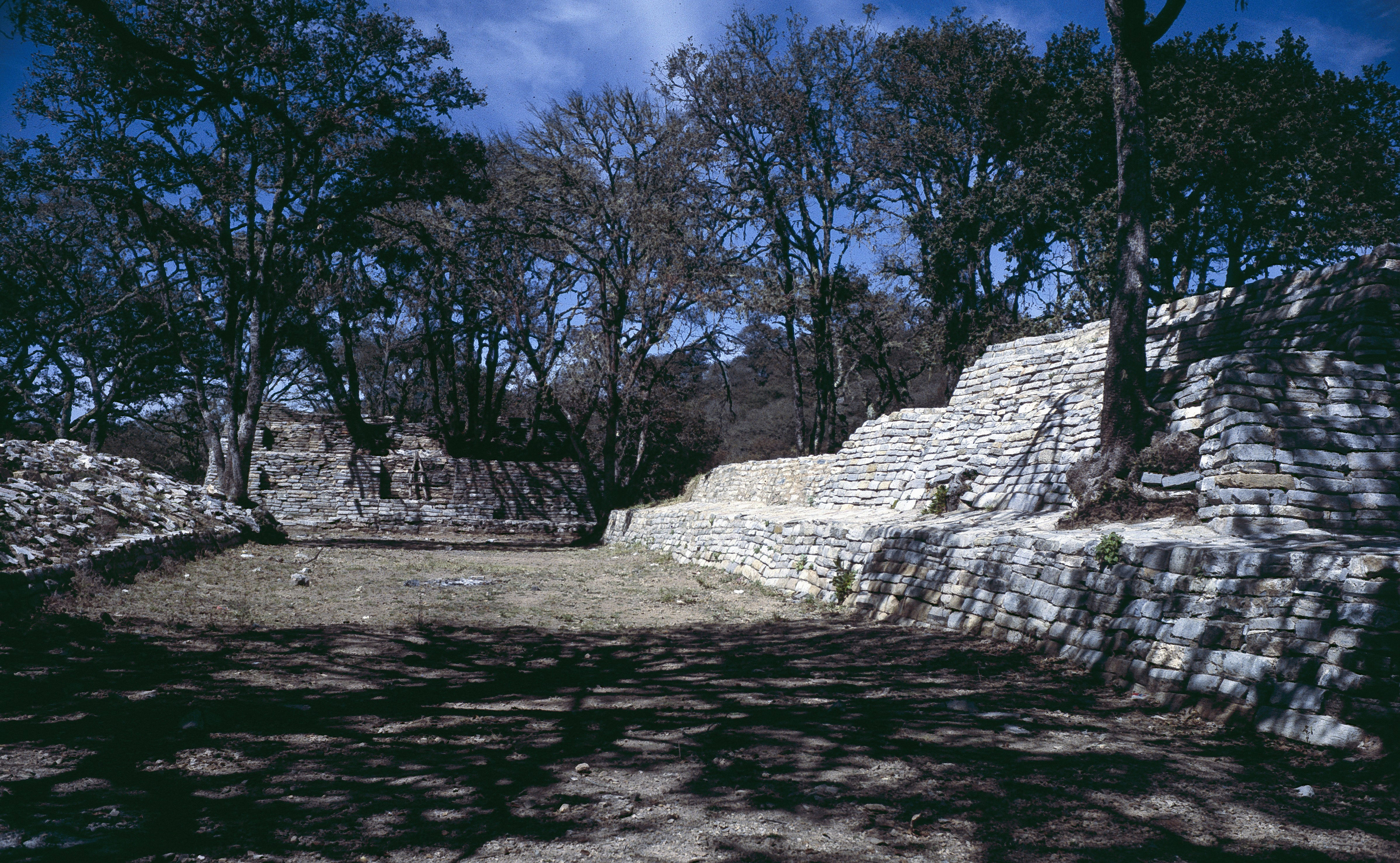
Ruins at Las Ranas

Humans have been living in the area for between 4,000 and 6,000 years, with the oldest settlements in the southern part. In the pre-Hispanic period the area was important for its commercial routes which linked the Gulf Coast, the Huasteca Region and the central highlands of Mexico principally, but there is evidence of commercial traffic from much further away. This made the area one of cultural exchanges with various ethnicities. When the Spanish arrived, the area was inhabited by the Chichimeca Jonaz, the Huastecas, the Ximpeces and the Pames.(arqueomex) Four archeological sites are open to the public: Las Ranas, Toluquilla, El Quirambal and El Cerrito.

Las Ranas and Toluquilla are two sites located near each other in the southwest of the Sierra Gorda, about ninety km northwest of Tequisquiapan, in San Joaquín. Both controlled the important commercial routes of the area which linked the Gulf Coast and the central highlands of Mexico, principally, but there is evidence of trade through here from even farther away. One economic activity important to both was the mining of cinnabar (mercury sulfate) which was highly prized as a red pigment in the pre Hispanic period. Las Ranas was established first, reaching its height between the years 200 and 600, but remained an inhabited city until 1000. The main political buildings were constructed on two natural elevations that form a corner. These elevations were terraced to accommodate buildings of stone and mud, then covered in stone plates or tiles to form façades. Other significant buildings include various temples and five Mesoamerican ball courts.

Toluquilla is a smaller site, occupied from 300 CE to 1300CE. This site was a ceremonial, political and administrative center, located on the upper part of an elongated hill, surrounded by ravines. The structures consist of a series of pyramid bases of stone and mud covered in stone plates or tiles. It also contains four Mesoamerican ball courts, one of which is much larger than other similar ones in the area from the same time. There is also a building which shows evidence of stucco work. Later in its history, the area was invaded by the Chichimeca Jonaz, but when the Spanish arrived both sites were abandoned.

El Quirambal is located in the Sierra Gorda between Pinal de Amoles and Jalpan de Serra, in the small community of San Juan. The ruins lie top of a hill and their construction is similar to other sites in the Huasteca region from the end of the Classic into the Post Classic periods (800-1200CE). One important structure is a Mesoamerican ball court which measures forty by twenty meters. On one side of this court, there is a temple with a pyramid base fourteen meters long and seven meters high. All along this flat topped hill, there are structures such as pyramid bases and dwellings and semi circular structures whose purpose has not been determined. The area was inhabited as early as 200 CE and stayed there until it was abandoned in 1200CE. During that time, much of the economy was based on primitive mining.

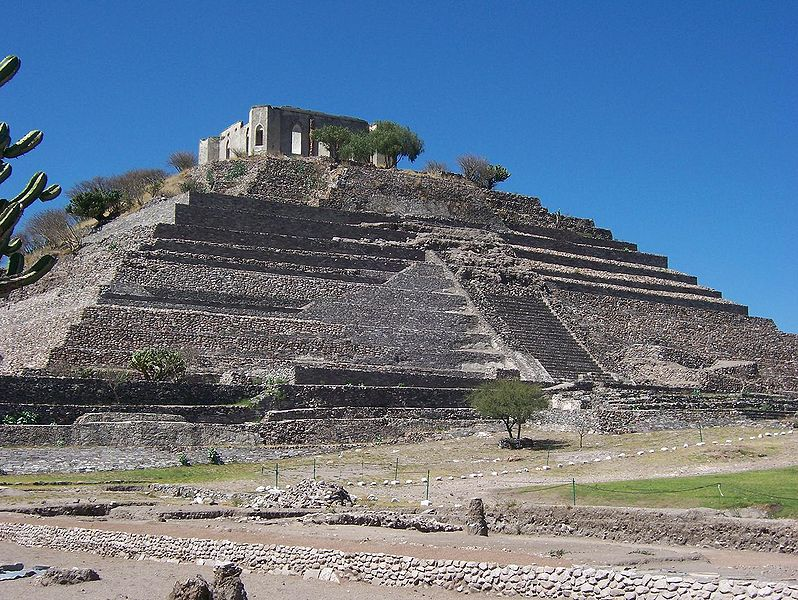
Pyramid at El Cerrito

El Cerrito is located in the municipality of Corregidora, only ten minutes from the historic center of the municipal seat. Twenty three million pesos has been budgeted for its restoration. Only part of the site is open to visitors, which focuses on the El Cerrito pyramid, which is illuminated on certain occasions. This pyramid's dimensions are similar to that of the Pyramid of the Moon in Teotihuacan. This is one of the main tourist attractions of the area. The name comes from the fact that the site was part of the El Cerrito Hacienda, named after the site, which then was only a "hill" covered in vegetation. The site was an important Toltec influenced ceremonial center, later occupied by the Chichimecas. Later, the area was converted into the sanctuary of the "Virgen de El Pueblito" Virgin Mary image for about a century. Besides the pyramid, another significant structure is called "El Fortín (The Small Fort), which was built over a pre Hispanic pyramid base in 1876, with Neo Gothic doors and windows.

The La Campana archeological site has been sacked and severely damaged. The site is the most important in the northwest of the state, corresponding to the Huasteca culture dating from the year 600 CE. The site was discovered in the mid 20th century, but has not been excavated due to the lack of funds. It contains 160 structures including platforms, plazas, patios, and more.

Other discoveries in the state have included that of a 2,300-year-old mummy of a female child, with accompanying fabric, hair, feathers and plant remains. The discovery was made in a cave at a dry, cold, high-altitude site in the Sierra Gorda region. It is one of the oldest mummies found in Mexico, and was mummified through natural causes rather than by any preservation technique. The girl is estimated to have died around 320 BCE.

== Villages ==
- Tlacote el Bajo

== See also ==
- Aqueduct of Querétaro
- Governor of Querétaro
- Josefa Ortiz de Domínguez

== Bibliography ==
- Jiménez González, Victor Manuel, ed. (2010). Querétaro:Guia para descubrir los encantos del estado [Querétaro: Guide to discover the charms of the state] (in Spanish). Mexico City: Editorial Oceano de Mexico, SA de CV. ISBN 978-607-400-235-5.
