= Coat of arms of Querétaro =

Coat of Arms of Querétaro

Versions
- Armiger: State of Querétaro
- Adopted: 1979

The coat of arms of Querétaro (Spanish: Escudo de Querétaro, lit. "state shield of Querétaro") is a symbol of the Free and Sovereign State of Querétaro in Mexico.

The coat of arms of the state of Querétaro is a representation of a legend of the conquest of New Spain. According to some chroniclers of that time, while the Spanish were fighting a battle against the Mesoamerican indigenous people, a total solar eclipse took place. During the time that the astronomical phenomenon lasted, the patron saint of Spain, Santiago el Mayor, also known as Santiago Matamoros and the Holy Cross appeared.

== Symbolism ==
It is divided into three fields where the meanings are shown. The upper one contains a darkened sun crowned by a cross, over the night sky that is revealed by the presence of two stars in the upper corners. This quarter represents the eclipse in which both the apostle and the cross appeared. In the lower left field, there is an image of the apostle, dressed in military clothing and mounted on a white horse. The apostle holds a sword in one hand and a banner of Spanish royalty in the other. In the lower right field, a vine laden with grapes is represented, and five ears of wheat, which represent the fertility of the Querétaro soil.

Later, the shield (as a crest) and the flag of Mexico were added, as a symbol of the integration of Querétaro into the Mexican federation. At the bottom of the shield, war symbols were added, such as cannons and bullets, and bundles of arrows, which recall the importance of Querétaro in the military history of Mexico, especially in the resistance against the Second Mexican Empire.

=== Elements ===
Querétaro was the third state in the country to adopt the national shield, on the crest or upper part of the coat of arms.

== History ==
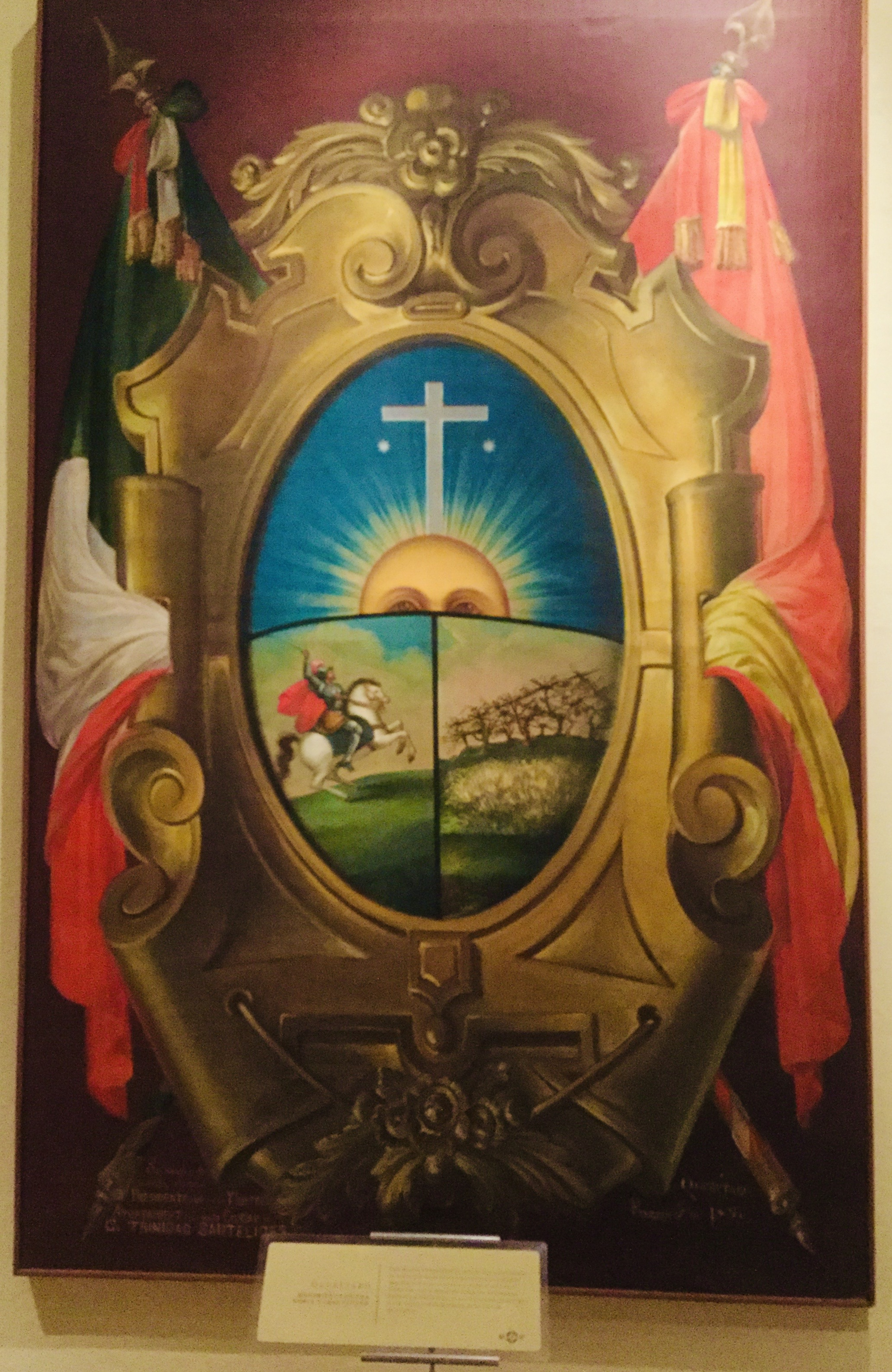
Picture of the coat of arms of Querétaro.

The coat of arms was donated by the Spanish crown to the city of Querétaro in 1665 and was later approved by the crown on September 29, 1712. The coat of arms was changed years later by its inhabitants after Mexico became independent.

After the independence of Mexico in 1823, the state of Querétaro was created, and it adopted the coat of arms of Querétaro City, which was represented by two flags, on the right the flag of Spain, on the left the flag of Mexico.

In 1979, a decree was established that established the new characteristics of the coat of arms and in 2015 the “Law of the Coat of Arms, the Flag and the Anthem of Querétaro” came into force, regulating the appearance of the coat of arms and approving the officialization of the Flag of Querétaro.

=== Historical coats ===
The symbol is used by all successive regimes in Querétaro, in different forms.

Coat of arms from 1712 to 1979.

Coat of arms from 1979 to 2009.

Coat of arms since 2015.

== See also ==
- Coat of arms of Mexico
- Flag of Querétaro
