= Querétaro Institute of Technology =

Educational institution in Mexico

Coordinates: 20.594°N 100.405°W

- Instituto Tecnológico de Querétaro
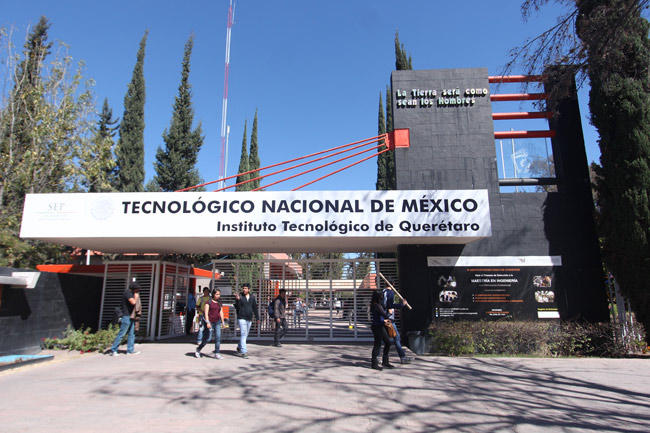
- Type: Public university
- Location: Querétaro, Querétaro, Mexico
- Website: www.itq.edu.mx

The Querétaro Institute of Technology (Spanish: Instituto Tecnológico de Querétaro), or ITQ is part of National Technological Institute of Mexico system, which is an organized educational complex, high academic self-sufficiency and continuity in their actions, together by a strong sense of national community and with strong traditions in the fields of academic planning, technological research and cultural and sports activities. As the system has a separate identity, but between schools shows regional characteristics.

The whole system represents a national effort to instill in young people a close relationship with science and technology, with such strength that will never become extinct in the future.

The Technological Institute of Querétaro opened on 2 January 1967 at the premises of the Industrial Technical School No. 59. On 15 May of that year, President Gustavo Diaz Ordaz officer delivered the present facilities of the Institute's first director Vera Ing Rodolfo Zapata.

Francisco Domínguez Servién, the Governor of Querétaro visited the school during its 50th-anniversary celebrations in 2017.
