= Urederra =

River in Spain

Coordinates: 42.8044°N 2.1358°W

Urederra (from the basque; ur- "water", -ederra "beautiful") is the natural exit of the aquifer created in the rock massif karst of Urbasa, Navarre. The river rises in The Natural Park of Urbasa-Andía (Sierra de Urbasa), near the village Baquedano. It is 19 km long and flows into the Ega River, which is a tributary of the Ebro. The first emerge is produced in a 713 metres high clift in the southern ledge of the rock massif and makes a more than 100 metres waterfall which with the passing of the years has modelled a rocky and karstic landscape.

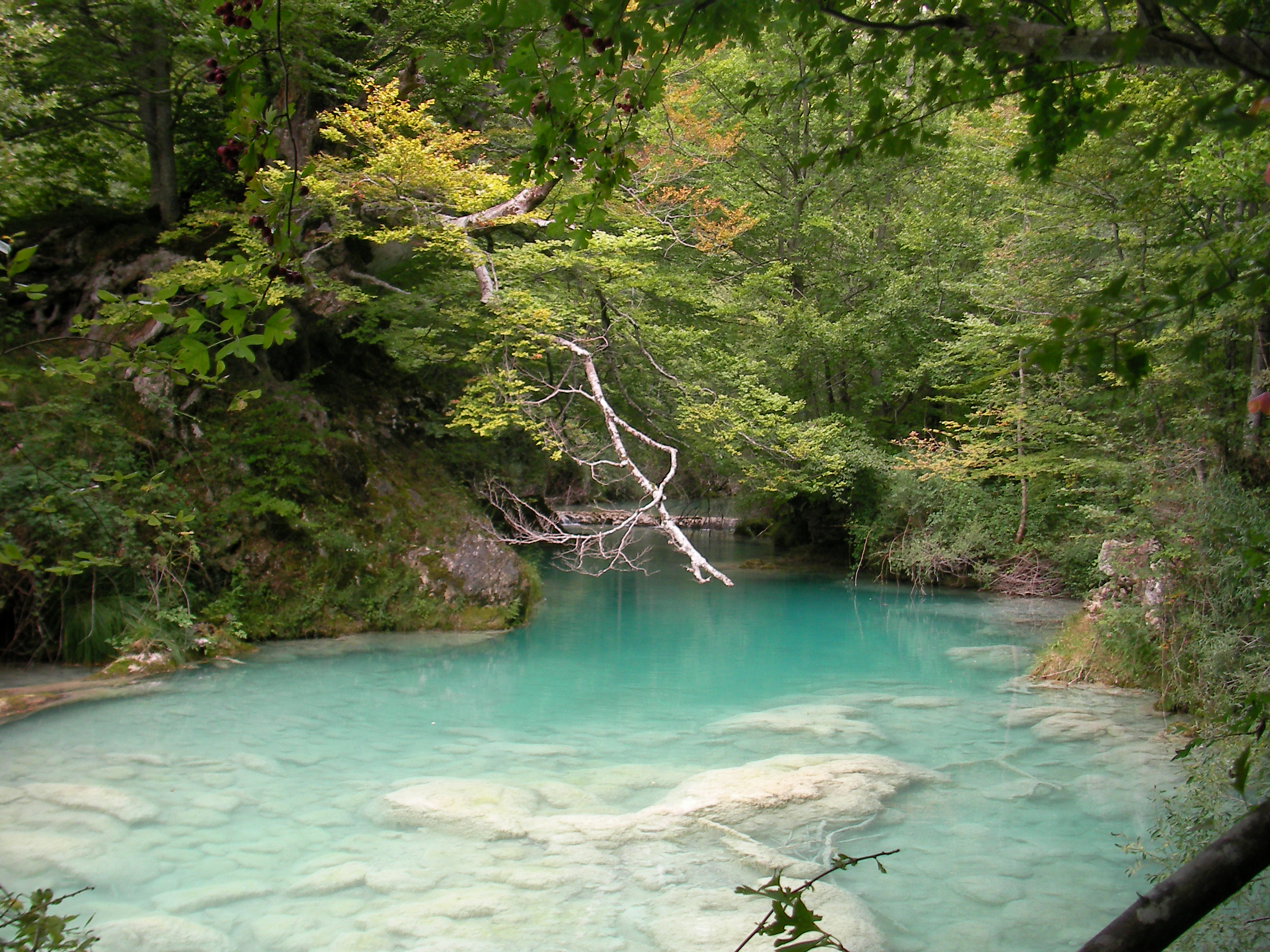
An Urederra in summer

Behind the waterfall there are some smaller waterfalls and a lot of river pools whose water has a unique turquoise colour, which is a remarkable feature of the Urederra River. Because of the karst the small waterfalls and pools have been made. The karstic area also enables water to strain through the cracks of the rocks and issuing from inside the land.

== Flora and fauna ==
In the Urederra river pools, waterfalls and water curtains can be seen surrounded by a dense forest where oaks, elms, maples, yews, hazelnuts and specially beeches are found. The diversity of flora is also remarkable in the fauna, among another species the vulture, the Egyptian vulture, the white tailed kite, the eagle and the raven are protagonists of the animal.

== Accesses ==
The official path to see the waterfalls of the Urederra River is the one called << the route of the waterfalls of Baquedano>>, a pedestrian trail that starts in the parking of the village, which is fitted out for the visitors. It has a low level of difficulty of 5,3 kilometres long and goes over the course of the river in the opposite way and ends in the source of the Urederra. The trail is signalled by markers and it is recommended to go from the left part which is near the river and return from the eastern path which goes higher and further from the river. Due to the high volume of visitors, it is necessary to make an online reservation to visit the waterfalls and leave the car in the nearby town of Baquedano. In 2017, 150.000 people visited Urederra.

== See also ==
- Urbasa
