= Tlacote el Bajo =

Village in Querétaro, Mexico

Coordinates: 20°38′59″N 100°30′00″W

Tlacote el Bajo is a village in Querétaro, Mexico. It is located in the municipality of Querétaro. It has 5453 inhabitants and is located at 1850 meters above sea level. It is famous for its allegedly miraculous water springs, which were visited by many celebrities, including NBA player Magic Johnson.
