= Natalia Baquedano =

Mexican photographer (1872–1936)

- Born: 1872; Querétaro, Mexico
- Died: 1936 (aged 63–64)
- Occupation: Photographer

Natalia Baquedano (1872–1936) was one of the pioneers of photography in Mexico. She was one of the first women to open a photographic studio, located at 6, Alcaiceria Street in Mexico City. At the time, there were 30 women photographers in Mexico, in comparison to the hundreds of women working as photographers in the United States. The Mexican historiography has considered her one of the first Mexican photographers.

Shanti Lesur, Baquedano's niece great-granddaughter, has made an independent effort to rescue and study the work of this photographer. The Shanti Lesur Archive is at the moment the most complete source of original materials. During 2007, Shanti Lesur organized an exhibition about the work of this photographer in the Cuauhnahuac Regional Museum, located in the Palace of Cortes, in the city of Cuernavaca, Morelos, Mexico.

As Bartra and Monroy have pointed out, the case of Baquedano is relevant since she preferred to study and work than becoming, as the great majority of women on her time, to become a mother and a wife. She opened one of the first studios where women worked in Mexico. She also created innovative photographic processes.

== Biography ==
Bartra points out that Baquedano was born in the city of Querétaro in 1872. Her parents were Francisco Baquedano, owner of a food packing plant, and Isabel Hurtado, who had four other daughters. Rodríguez indicates that Baquedano began her artistic training at the city of Querétaro "under Direction of Mr. Almaraz in the fields of drawing, painting and sculpture." Monroy points out that Baquedano became independent from her family when she was young, traveling and establishing herself in Mexico City to enter the National Art School, probably between 1895 And 1897, something really atypical at the end of the 19th century.

Both Bartra and Rodríguez provide data concerning the photographic study founded and operated by Natalia Baquedano: the first states that it was located on Calle Alcacería No. 6, corner of "5 de Mayo", and the second that it was opened in 1898 along with a partner, A Rico, under the name National Photography.

In addition to these biographical data, it is known that Baquedano did not marry or have any children, and that she died in 1936 at the age of 64.

== Work ==
Both Bartra and Rodriguez point out that Baquedano was mainly devoted to portrait. Rodríguez cites an announcement of National Photography that indicated the type of work done in this one: "photography on platinum paper, albumin, silk, porcelain, metal and everything that can be applied photographs. - Illuminations on oil mirrors and watercolor. - Portraits, views and groups outside the workshop. Conventional prices. Amplifications of all sizes, direct or taken from any portrait, however small, guaranteed the likeness." This document also announced a "Newness": the" photograph on natural flowers", an invention of Baquedano, which won her a celebrity, patenting it in her name and giving Carmen Romero Rubio de Diaz (wife of the Mexican President at the time) a bouquet of flowers with this ephemeral art.

Rodriguez mentions that her work was "on the tone of his contemporaries". In his publication, there is one reproduction of one of Baquedano's studio photographs: a group portrait of the Founding Commission of the Astronomical Society of Mexico, c. 1900.

Both Rodríguez and Bartra point out that, in addition to the individual or group portraits made in the Baquedano photographic studio, the artist also made some similar compositions to appearances "that seem taken from everyday life (the image of her parents, elegantly dressed, drinking beer), or merely theatrical (a child sitting on the Moon, another as an angel) and even playful compositions. She also made pictures of dead infants, something common at the time, but she would place the body next to a skull.

According to Bartra, the Shanti Lesur Archive is composed almost entirely of portraits of the photographer's family, most notably the portraits of her sister Clemencia. Natalia Baquedano is an important source of the female portraits since she had a special predilection of portraying women. What it is outstanding in Baquedano's art is that she does not portrait female characters as it was usually done on her time. The daguerreotypes, nitrocellulose flexible film negatives, glass plates and paper prints, show a playful and not stigmatized universe.

== Scholarship on Natalia Baquedano and early women photographers in Mexico ==
Historians such as Eli Bartra, Rebeca Monroy Nasr and José Antonio Rodríguez have studied her work. Some articles in different magazines (Política y Cultura, UAM Xochimilco; Alquimia) and article in the book Fotógrafos en México (1872-1960) are the closest to a biography.
