= Aqueduct of Querétaro =

Aqueduct in Mexico

Coordinates: 20°35′44″N 100°22′27″W

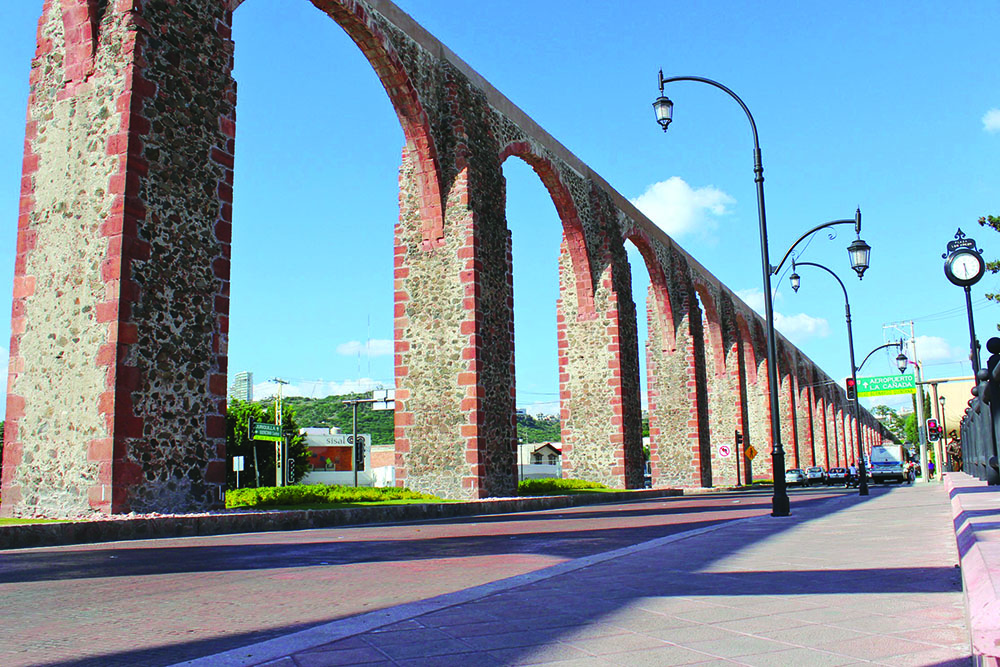
Aqueduct of Querétaro

The aqueduct of Querétaro is an 18th-century aqueduct in the Mexican city of Querétaro. It is a symbol of the city of Querétaro and one of the largest aqueducts in Mexico. It forms a part of the historic center of Querétaro, a UNESCO World Heritage Site. It is 1,280 metres (4,200 ft) long and has 74 arches which reach an average height of 28.5 m (94 ft).

The aqueduct has been designated as an International Historic Civil Engineering Landmark by the American Society of Civil Engineers.

== Construction ==
Beginning in the second half of the 17th century, when it was named the "Third City," the city of Querétaro became one of the most prosperous and beautiful towns in New Spain, reaching the height of its prosperity and urban development in the 18th century. The city lacked an efficient and healthy drinking water system, as the old canals and pipes that supplied the city carried dirty and unhealthy water, contaminated by the butcher shops. The Capuchin nuns, overseen by the Marquis, Juan Antonio, had to present their complaints to him about the need for clean water to complete their duties. Although Querétaro had plenty of river water, it lacked purity and clarity. Alejandro Ibarra did most of the construction design for the aqueduct.

Juan Antonio of Urrutia and Arana, the Marquis, communicated his resolution to the city council, whose council members promised to help up to the amount of $25,000, which they proposed to collect from the residents. The Marquis looked around Querétaro for a source to supply the valuable liquid. Examining various springs, he found that the most suitable site, given its convenient height in relation to the city, was the so-called Ojo de Agua del Capulín, named for a tree in town, La Cañada. Through only one channel, the water did not flow as fast at the beginning. After the Marquis' work, the current increased to 4,000 straws (about 30 liters per second).

A careful study of the land, performed by the engineer Miguel Mendoza, made Don Juan Antonio see that no fewer than eighteen springs, from large to small, flowed at that point. Consequently, the Marquis decided to build a large water or pool to capture the water they produced altogether. From there, the water was led by canal to Querétaro. It was very irregular in shape and, according to Don Heraclio Cabrera, "completely lacking in architectural beauty," despite the fact that the Marquis adorned its main front with a statue of Saint Anthony. The statue was located inside a niche, which does not exist today. On the opposite side, the water source was established. Once the water tank was finished, a fence was built around it high enough to protect it, and the key to its last entrance door was given to one of the councilmen.

From the point of the irrigation channel, the lime and stone canal starts, which in itself is an outstanding work, since it measured two leagues long. As Father Francisco Antonio Navarrete says in his Relación Peregrina, "sometimes it walks on one side, other times on the other side of the road, sometimes because of the steepness of the slopes, other times because of the depth of the streams; sometimes allowing itself to be seen over the arches, to pass through the depth of the ravines; other times hiding itself completely from view; sometimes running from north to south, other times from east to west…" until arriving where the actual aqueduct begins. The aqueduct rules the city, given that it covers the extensive ravine from the western hill of La Cañada to the nunnery of La Cruz. It was specifically for this nunnery that the series of arches were made, so that the water could arrive using gravity.

On October 22, 1735, the water finally arrived at the water box in the small square of La Cruz, from where it was to be distributed, three years later, to the public fountains through different routes around the city. This box is the final touch and end of the aqueduct, consisting of a platform that serves as the base of the fountain, attached to a reddish, stone wall on which the stone figure of a lion stands out. From the lion's jaws, came out the stream that supplied it. On the upper part, the royal coat of arms and an image of Our Lady of the Pillar, or the Blessed Virgin Mary, crowned the piece.

The work was finished on October 17, 1738. Its total cost added up to $125,000, of which the Marquis donated more than $88,000, a sum that came from his wife's fortune. The remaining cost was divided up proportionally among the residents. On October 29, 1738, a mass of thanks was sung to celebrate the special occasion. There were also additional celebrations that lasted no fewer than fifteen days, including a parade of floats, comedies in the coliseum, an Indian walk, praises, dances of acrobatic stunts, cockfights, rockets, fireworks, and bullfights.

== See also ==
- List of World Heritage Sites in Mexico
