= 1st federal electoral district of Querétaro =

Federal electoral district of Mexico

Querétaro's 1st
- Electoral district of the Chamber of Deputies of Mexico

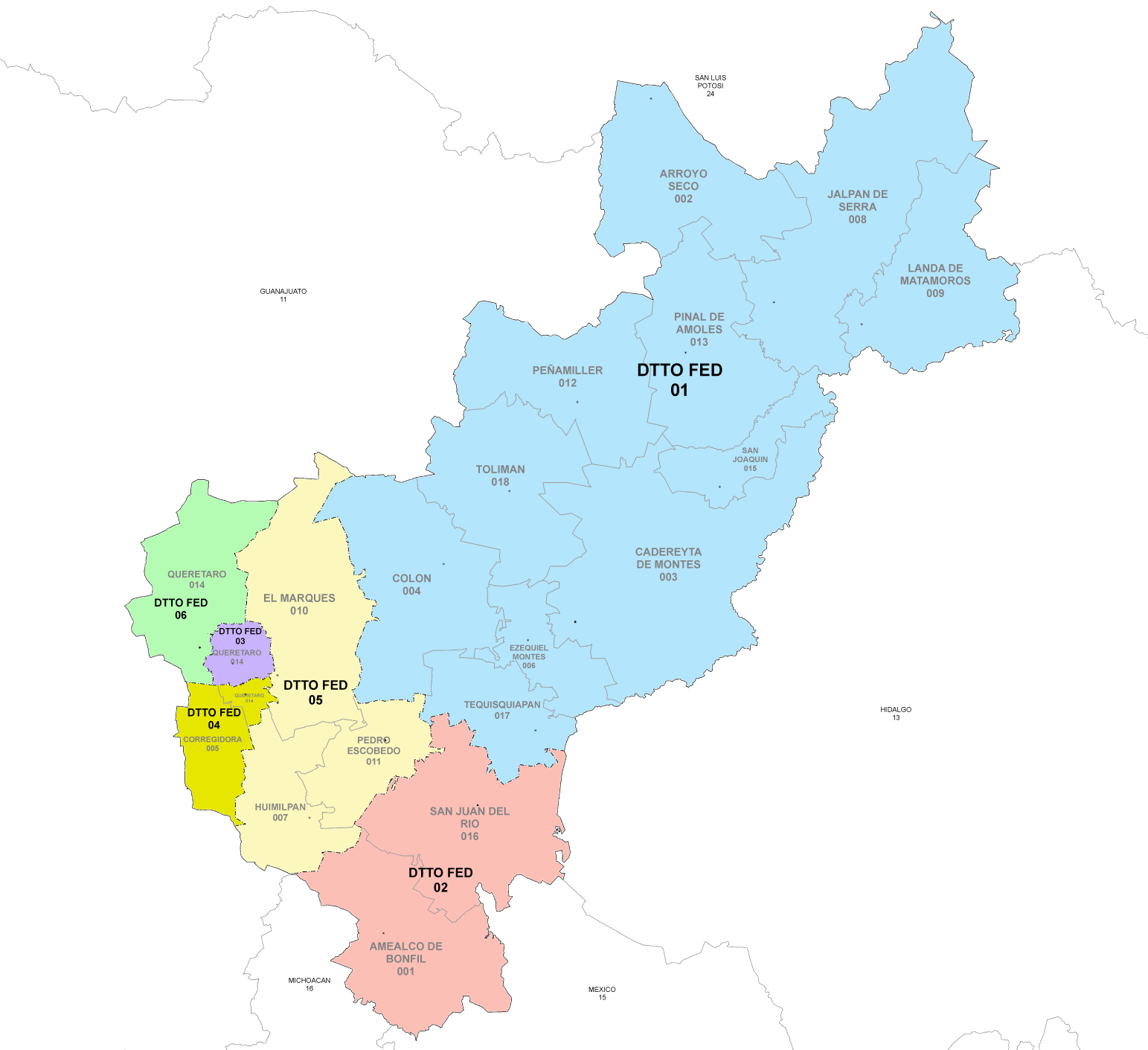
- 1st district since 2023

Incumbent
- Member: Gilberto Herrera Ruiz
- Party: ▌Morena
- Congress: 66th (2024–2027)

District
- State: Querétaro
- Head town: Cadereyta
- Coordinates: 20°42′N 99°49′W
- Covers: 11 municipalities: Arroyo Seco, Cadereyta de Montes, Colón, Ezequiel Montes, Jalpan de Serra, Landa de Matamoros, Peñamiller, Pinal de Amoles, San Joaquín, Tequisquiapan, Tolimán
- PR region: Fifth
- Precincts: 194
- Population: 395,695 (2020 census)

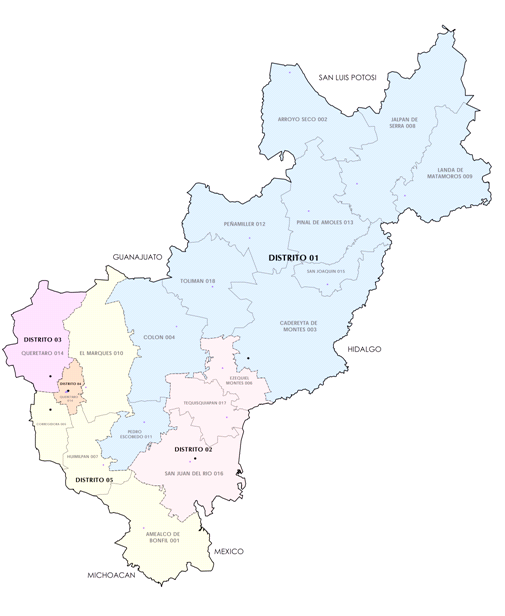
Querétaro under the 2017–2022 districting plan

The 1st federal electoral district of Querétaro (Spanish: Distrito electoral federal 01 de Querétaro) is one of the 300 electoral districts into which Mexico is divided for elections to the federal Chamber of Deputies and one of six such districts in the state of Querétaro.

It elects one deputy to the lower house of Congress for each three-year legislative session by means of the first-past-the-post system. Votes cast in the district also count towards the calculation of proportional representation ("plurinominal") deputies; since 2024, those elected from the fifth region.

The current member for the district, elected in the 2024 general election, is Gilberto Herrera Ruiz of the National Regeneration Movement (Morena).

== District territory ==
Under the 2023 districting plan adopted by the National Electoral Institute (INE), which assigned Querétaro an additional seat in Congress and is to be used for the 2024, 2027 and 2030 federal elections, the 1st district covers 194 precincts (secciones electorales) across 11 municipalities in the north of the state:

- Arroyo Seco, Cadereyta de Montes, Colón, Ezequiel Montes, Jalpan de Serra, Landa de Matamoros, Peñamiller, Pinal de Amoles, San Joaquín, Tequisquiapan and Tolimán.

The head town (cabecera distrital), where results from individual polling stations are gathered together and tallied, is the city of Cadereyta. The district reported a population of 395,695 in the 2020 census. With the Sierra Gorda mountain range accounting for much of its area, it is by far the state's largest district.

== Previous districting schemes ==
Evolution of electoral district numbers
	1974	1978	1996	2005	2017	2023
Querétaro	2	3	4	4	5	6
Chamber of Deputies	196	300				

2017–2022

Between 2017 and 2022, when the state comprised five federal electoral districts, the 1st had its head town at Cadereyta de Montes and it covered 10 municipalities, mostly in the north of the state:
- Arroyo Seco, Cadereyta de Montes, Colón, Jalpan de Serra, Landa de Matamoros, Pedro Escobedo, Peñamiller, Pinal de Amoles, San Joaquín and Tolimán.

2005–2017

Under the 2005 plan, Querétaro had four districts. The 1st covered 12 municipalities in the north-east of the state, with its head town at Cadereyta:
- Arroyo Seco, Cadereyta de Montes, Colón, Ezequiel Montes, Jalpan, Landa, Pedro Escobedo, Peñamiller, Pinal de Amoles, San Joaquín, Tequisquiapan and Tolimán.

1996–2005

In the 1996 scheme, which gave Querétaro its fourth congressional seat, the district had the same configuration as in the 2005 plan: 12 municipalities in the north and east of the state, with Cadereyta serving as the head town.

1978–1996

The districting scheme in force from 1978 to 1996 was the result of the 1977 electoral reforms, which increased the number of single-member seats in the Chamber of Deputies from 196 to 300. Under that plan, Querétaro's seat allocation rose from two to three. The 1st district covered the municipality of Querétaro.

== Deputies returned to Congress ==
(Mexico) National parties
- Current
- PAN
- PRI
- PT
- PVEM
- MC
- Morena
- PAZ
- Somos
- Defunct or local only
- PLM
- PNR
- PRM
- PNM
- PP
- PPS
- PARM
- PFCRN
- CON
- PANAL
- PSD
- PES
- PES
- PRD

Querétaro's 1st district
Election	Deputy	Party	Term	Legislature
1916	Juan N. Frías		1916–1917	Constituent Congress of Querétaro
...
1973	José Ortiz Arana	Institutional Revolutionary Party	1973–1976	49th Congress
1976	Eduardo Ugalde Vargas	Institutional Revolutionary Party	1976–1979	50th Congress
1979	Fernando Ortiz Arana	Institutional Revolutionary Party	1979–1982	51st Congress
1982	Angélica Paulín Posada	Institutional Revolutionary Party	1982–1985	52nd Congress
1985	Edmundo González Llaca	Institutional Revolutionary Party	1985–1988	53rd Congress
1988	María Elena Martínez Carranza	Institutional Revolutionary Party	1988–1991	54th Congress
1991	Fernando Ortiz Arana	Institutional Revolutionary Party	1991–1994	55th Congress
1994	José Manuel García García	Institutional Revolutionary Party	1994–1997	56th Congress
1997	Ruperto Alvarado Gudiño	Institutional Revolutionary Party	1997–2000	57th Congress
2000	Timoteo Martínez Pérez	Institutional Revolutionary Party	2000–2003	58th Congress
2003	José Alfonso Muñoz Muñoz	Institutional Revolutionary Party	2003–2006	59th Congress
2006	José Ignacio Rubio Chávez	National Action Party (Mexico)	2006–2009	60th Congress
2009	Miguel Martínez Peñaloza	National Action Party (Mexico)	2009–2012	61st Congress
2012	Delvim Fabiola Bárcenas Nieves	Institutional Revolutionary Party	2012–2015	62nd Congress
2015	José Hugo Cabrera Ruiz	Institutional Revolutionary Party	2015–2018	63rd Congress
2018	Sonia Rocha Acosta	National Action Party (Mexico)	2018–2021	64th Congress
2021	Sonia Rocha Acosta	National Action Party (Mexico)	2021–2024	65th Congress
2024	Gilberto Herrera Ruiz	National Regeneration Movement	2024–2027	66th Congress

== Presidential elections ==
Querétaro's 1st district
Election	District won by	Party or coalition	%
2018	Andrés Manuel López Obrador	Juntos Haremos Historia	39.5102
2024	Claudia Sheinbaum Pardo	Sigamos Haciendo Historia	59.5847
