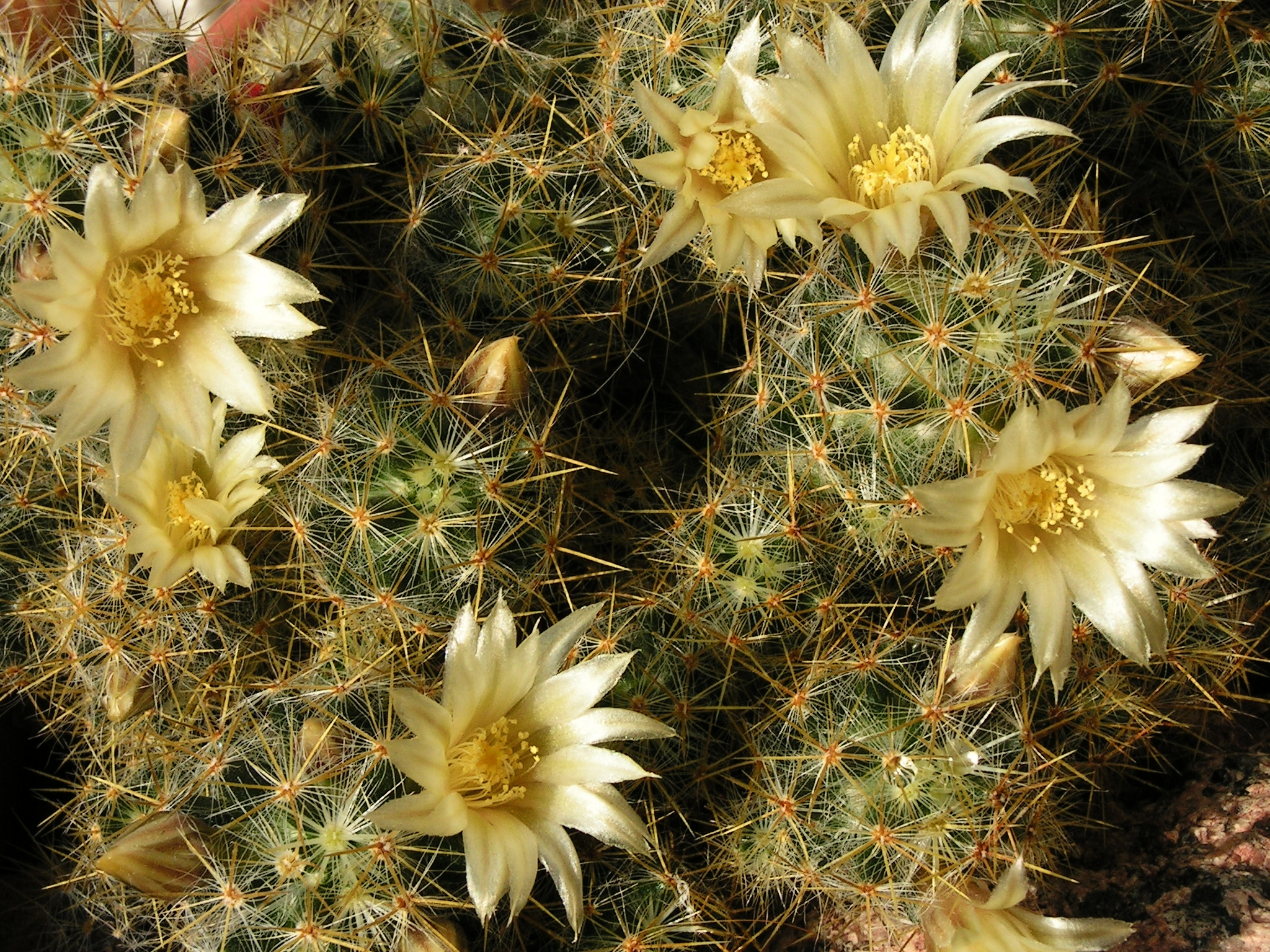

Scientific classification
- Kingdom: Plantae
- Clade: Tracheophytes
- Clade: Angiosperms
- Clade: Eudicots
- Order: Caryophyllales
- Family: Cactaceae
- Subfamily: Cactoideae
- Genus: Mammillaria
- Species: M. prolifera

Binomial name
- Mammillaria prolifera (Mill.) Haw., 1812

Synonyms
- Synonymy: Cactus proliferus; Mammillaria glomerata; Mammillaria multiceps

= Mammillaria prolifera =

Species of cactus

Mammillaria prolifera, commonly known as the Texas nipple-cactus, West Indian nipple-cactus, grape cactus, or hair-covered cactus, is a species of cactus native to North America. Three subspecies are currently recognized: M. prolifera subsp. prolifera (Cuba, Dominican Republic, and Haiti), M. prolifera subsp. arachnoidea (Mexico), and M. prolifera subsp. texana (Mexico and the United States). The subspecies differ in overall size, the number and color of the spines, and the shape and color of the flowers. The plant's round or slightly elongated stems usually form small, dense clusters, and flowers are commonly born alongside fruit. It is one of the most popular and widely grown Mammillaria species.

== Taxonomy ==
Mammillaria prolifera was first described in 1768 by Philip Miller in The Gardeners Dictionary. Miller named it Cactus proliferus, "commonly called Small Childing Melon-Thistle". Several modern common names are in use, including Texas or West Indian nipple-cactus, hair-covered cactus, and grape cactus. It is the second species in the Mammillaria genus to be described, after the type species, M. mammillaris. M. prolifera belongs to the Mammillaria clade of the genus. The most closely related species is M. senilis.

Three subspecies are presently recognized: M. prolifera subsp. prolifera, M. prolifera subsp. arachnoidea, and M. prolifera subsp. texana (synonymous with M. multiceps). M. prolifera subsp. arachnoidea was originally described in 1978 as a variety following chromosome studies, and is unique in being diploid. M. prolifera subsp. prolifera and M. prolifera subsp. texana are polyploids, 6x and 4x, respectively. Two more subspecies were described. Of these, subsp. haitiensis is now considered synonymous with subsp. prolifera. The other has been found to represent a distinct species, M. zublerae, and to be more closely related to M. vetula.

== Description ==
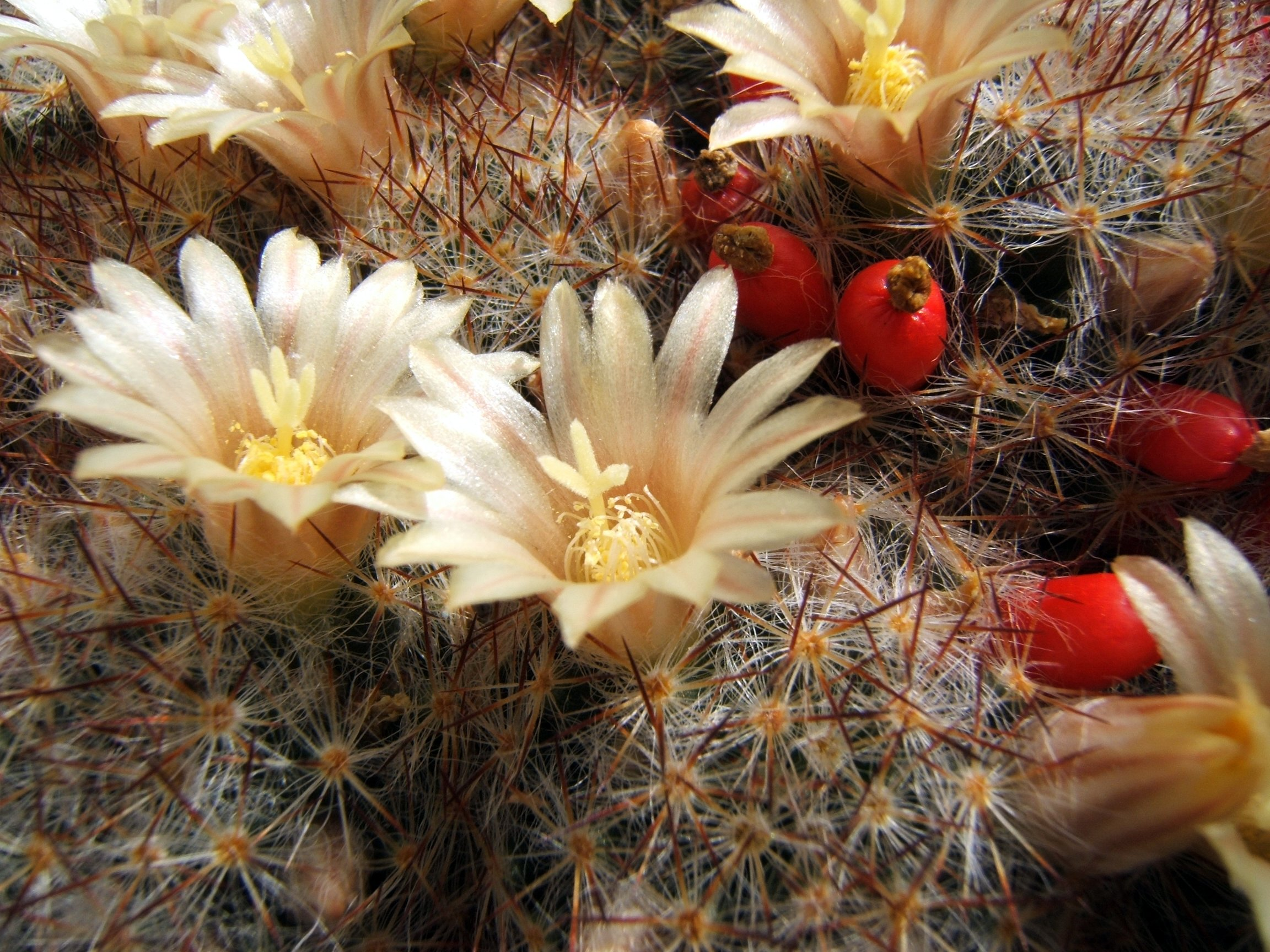
This cactus frequently bears flowers and fruit at the same time.

Mammillaria prolifera is a succulent subshrub. It was originally described by Miller as a "roundish prolific Cactus, with oval tubercles closely joined, having long white beards" and "tufts of white down on the knobs, and also between them at every joint, which makes the whole plant appear as if it was covered with fine cotton". This description refers to plants brought to London by William Houston, likely from Cuba. It is now recognized that this is a highly variable species. It usually grows in dense clusters, with each stem being round to slightly elongated, reaching about 9 cm tall and 4.5 cm wide. The surface is covered in small, cylindrical bumps (tubercles) about 1 cm long, and their bases are either bare or have fine white hairs that can be as long or longer than the bumps themselves. The roots are fibrous. The fruit is edible, cylindric, measuring 8–20 mm long and 4–5 mm wide, juicy only in the outer walls, and the dried flower remains attached. The subspecies differ primarily in the shape and number of spines.

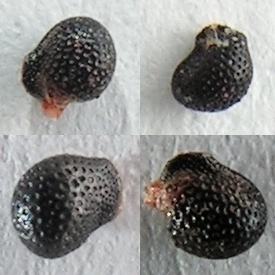
The seed is small and its color–unlike those of the flowers, fruit, and spines–invariable.

Mammillaria prolifera subsp. prolifera may form clusters or remain simple. It has a rounded to short, cylindrical shape, growing up to 6–7 cm wide. The spaces between its bumps (axils) are filled with short wool and white bristles. It has many radial spines—around 60 or more—that are white, bristle-like to fine and hair-like, and can be straight or twisted, ranging from 6–15 mm long. Its central spines number between 6 and 11, are needle-like, and one is thicker and longer than the rest. These spines are slightly fuzzy, glassy white to pale straw-yellow at the base, and have darker tips, measuring 4–7 mm long. Its flowers are cream yellow with a reddish brown midstripe, approximately 15 mm long and just as wide. The fruit is orange-red and may last until the plant blooms again the next year. The seed is black.

Mammillaria prolifera subsp. arachnoidea is set apart from the other subspecies primarily by the smaller size of its stems and an overall softer appearance. It has 4–5 extremely thin central spines. They are almost indistinguishable from the radial spines, which in turn resemble a cobweb. Its flowers are shaped like a narrow funnel.

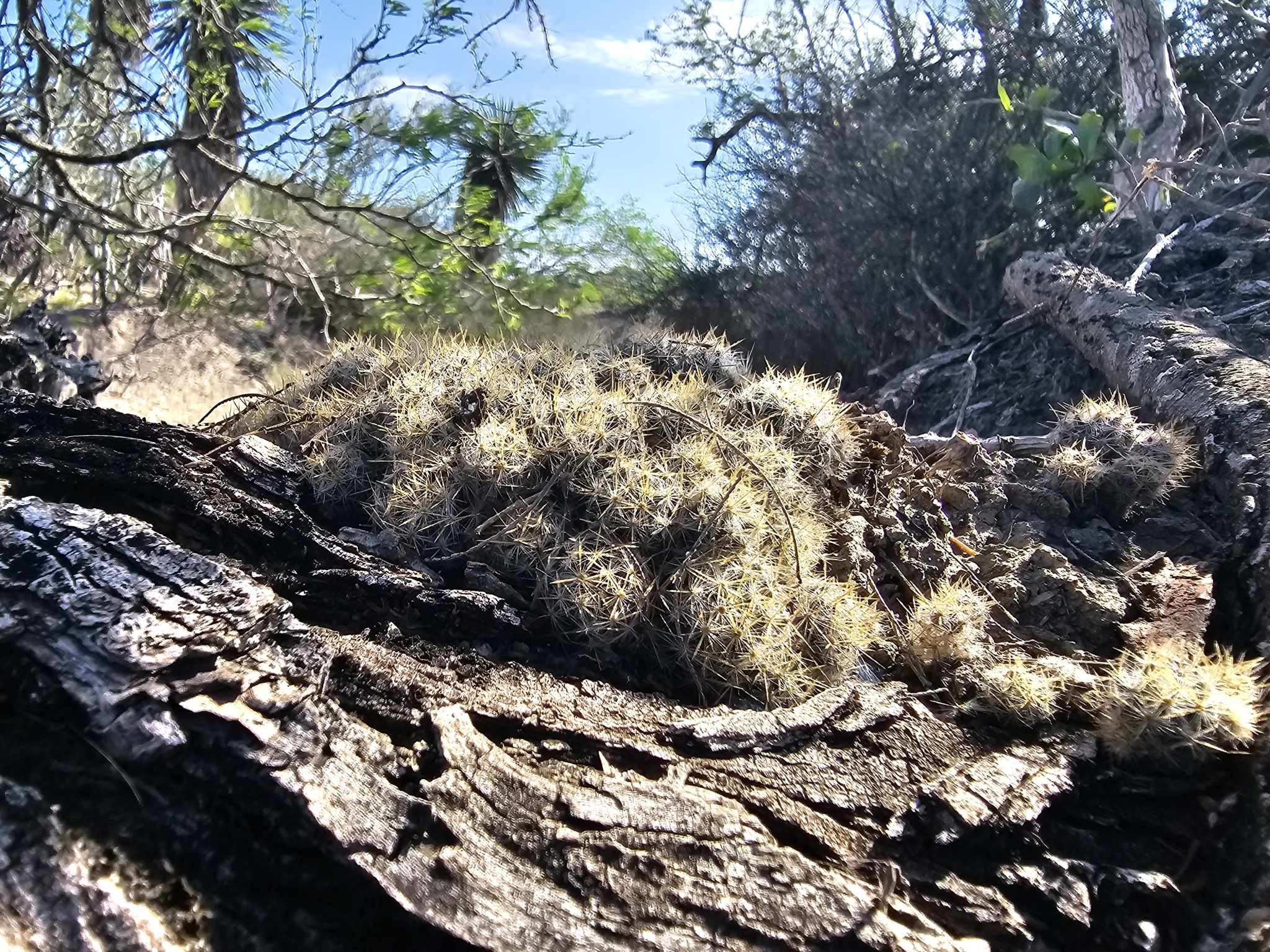
The species is inconspicuous in its natural habitat.

Mammillaria prolifera subsp. texana is distinguished by its greyish color. It is densely clustering all along the stem. The stems are 5–7 cm in diameter and form low, almost flat clumps. The bristles in the axils are white. It has over 50 thin, needle-like radial spines per areola; these are 5–9 mm long and white. The areola usually has 8–12 needle-like central spines, which are 4–7 mm long, white and somewhat sturdier than the radial spines. Their tips are brown. All spines are straight and smooth. The flowers, about 20 mm long and 15 mm wide, have white edges and a brownish pink midstripe. They appear throughout spring, and are followed by red fruit and black seed. This subspecies is especially freely fruiting. A yellow-spined form exists, with pale yellow radial spines, honey yellow central spines, and creamy yellow to pale yellow flowers. This form has not been named.

== Distribution and habitat ==
Mammillaria prolifera is native to Texas, northeastern states of Mexico, Cuba, and Hispaniola. It grows primarily in the tropical biome that undergoes seasonal droughts. Mammillaria prolifera subsp. prolifera is found in Cuba, Dominican Republic, and Haiti, typically at elevations between 30 m and 50 m above sea level. Britton and Rose noted its presence at Guantanamo Bay Naval Base. They described it as growing in low, dry thickets, where it is "quite inconspicuous but abundant". Specific locations include Port-au-Prince and Ganthier in Haiti and Guayubin in the Dominican Republic. Mammillaria prolifera subsp. arachnoidea has been collected in the Mexican states of Hidalgo (in the canyon of the Moctezuma River, east of Jacala) and Tamaulipas (8 km west of Antiguo Morelos, on rocks next to Federal Highway 8) at 300 m above sea level.

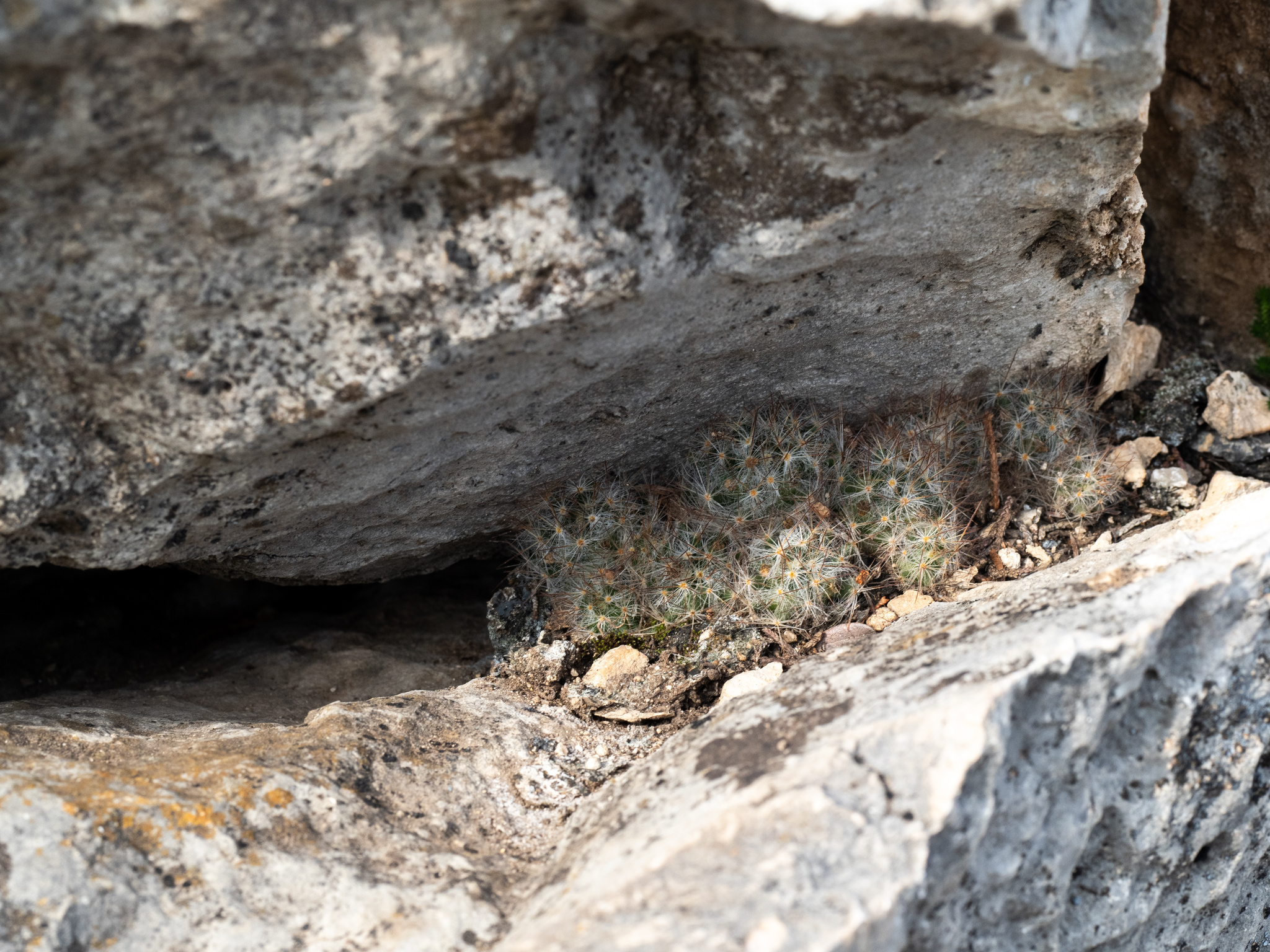
M. prolifera subsp. texana, seen here in a rock crevice, grows in widely different habitats.

The distribution of Mammillaria prolifera subsp. texana extends from the US state of Texas to the Mexican states of Coahuila, Nuevo León, Querétaro, San Luis Potosí, and Tamaulipas at 400–2250 m above sea level. In Texas it is found at 0–600 m in the Tamaulipan thorn scrub, oak-juniper woodlands, gravel, limestone crevices, or litter beneath vegetation, cliffs, hills, valleys, and plains. It grows all along the Rio Grande and along the Gulf Coast of Texas to the vicinity of Rockport, never straying more than a few miles from the coast. Here it thrives in rich, deep lowland soils near thickets or among the clumps of coastal grasses on the flat plains near the Gulf. At Eagle Pass it diverges from the river, and it is found on the rocky hilltops of the Edwards Escarpment, wedged into limestone crevices, often in very little soil and shaded by the rocks. It reaches north almost to Bandera and Rocksprings, where winters become too cold for it to survive. The yellow-spined form may be found both alone and together with the brown-spined form, and the two do not appear to interbreed. The ecologist Den Weniger, who observed the two forms in the wild, suggests that they might be phenotypes of the same variable population.

== Cultivation ==
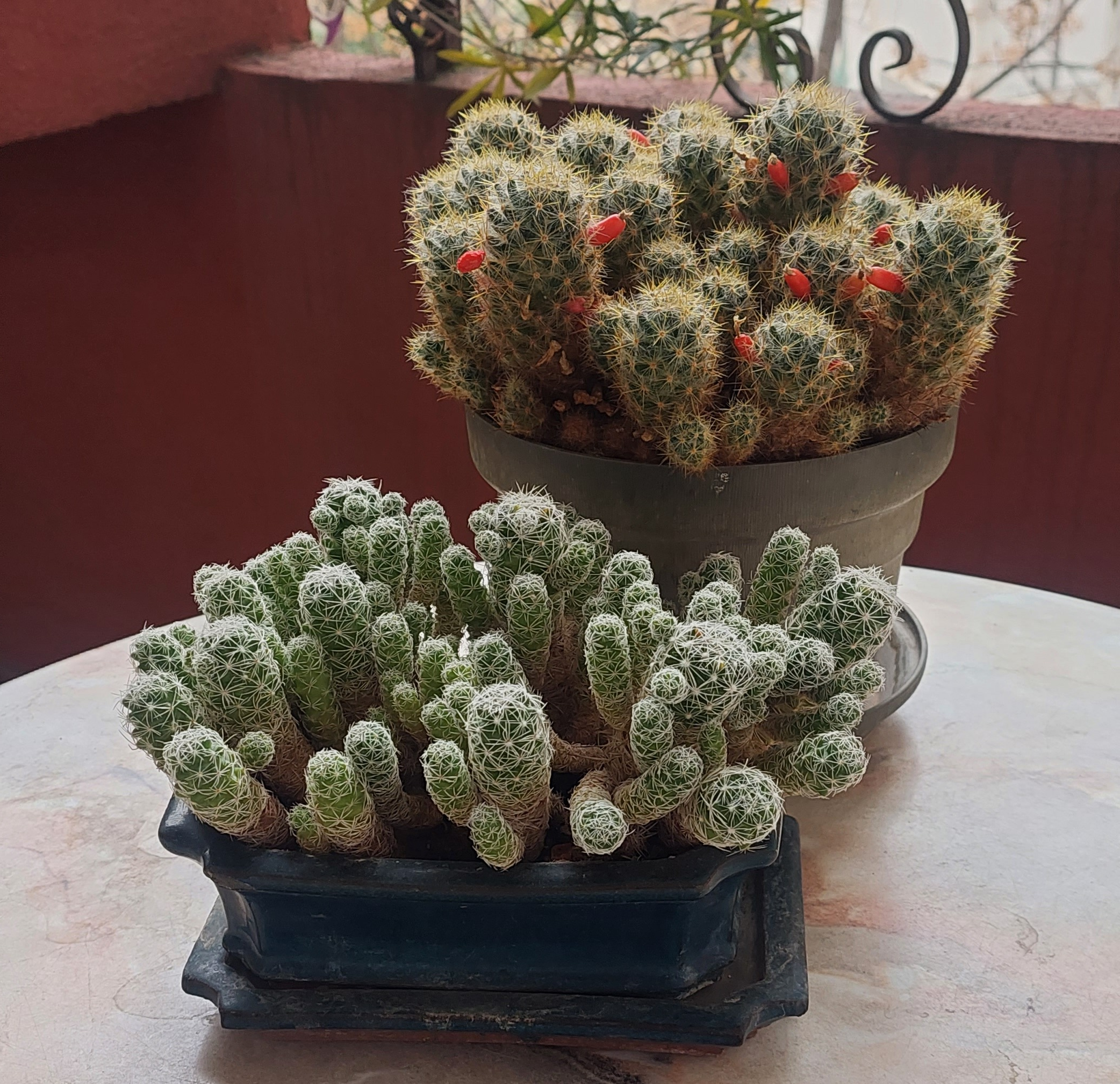
M. prolifera and M. vetula are credited with introducing many cacti fanciers to the genus.

Mammillaria prolifera is one of the best known, easiest to grow, and most commonly cultivated Mammillaria species. The cacti nurseryman and journalist John Pilbeam notes that, because of this, it is "almost looked down upon by the connoisseurs". It is appreciated for its attractively dense tufts of spines and its ability to produce flowers and fruit simultaneously and more abundantly than any other Mammillaria species. Like M. vetula subsp. gracilis, M. prolifera is easy to propagate and distribute; Pilbeam estimates that most cacti fanciers become interested in the genus after growing these two species. The most commonly cultivated subspecies is M. mammillaria subsp. texana. According to Pilbeam, M. mammillaria subsp. arachnoidea is more challenging to grow than the other subspecies.
