= Sonia Rocha Acosta =

Mexican politician from the PAN party

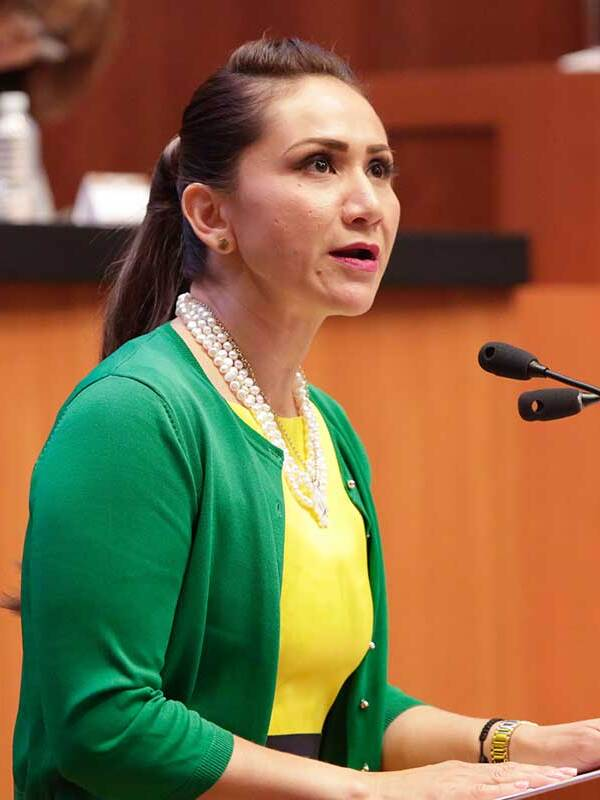

Deputy of the Congress of the Union for Querétaro's 1st district
- Incumbent
- Assumed office 2018

Member of the Senate of Mexico for Querétaro
- In office 3 March 2015 – 2018
- Preceded by: Francisco Domínguez Servién

Personal details
- Born: 30 March 1978 (age 48)
- Party: PAN
- Education: Autonomous University of Querétaro
- Occupation: Politician, lawyer

Sonia Rocha Acosta (born 30 March 1978) is a Mexican politician and attorney from Querétaro. A member of the National Action Party (PAN), she was elected to the federal Chamber of Deputies in 2018. From 2015 to 2018, she was a Senator from Querétaro.

== Education ==
Sonia Rocha Acosta has a degree in law and a master's degree in state and municipal public administration from the Autonomous University of Querétaro.

== Early career ==
Rocha Acosta first became involved in PAN at age 16 as a member of the party's youth group. In 2003, she joined the office of the inspector of the Querétaro attorney general. From 2006 to 2009, she served in the Querétaro state legislature.

=== Senate of Mexico ===
In the 2012 general election, she was elected as a substitute for Senator Francisco Domínguez Servién. Following Domínguez's leave of absence to mount a candidacy for Governor of Querétaro, she went on to replace him as a member of the Senate on 3 March 2015.

As a Senator, she pushed a proposal to require all members of Congress to have a higher education degree.

=== Chamber of Deputies ===
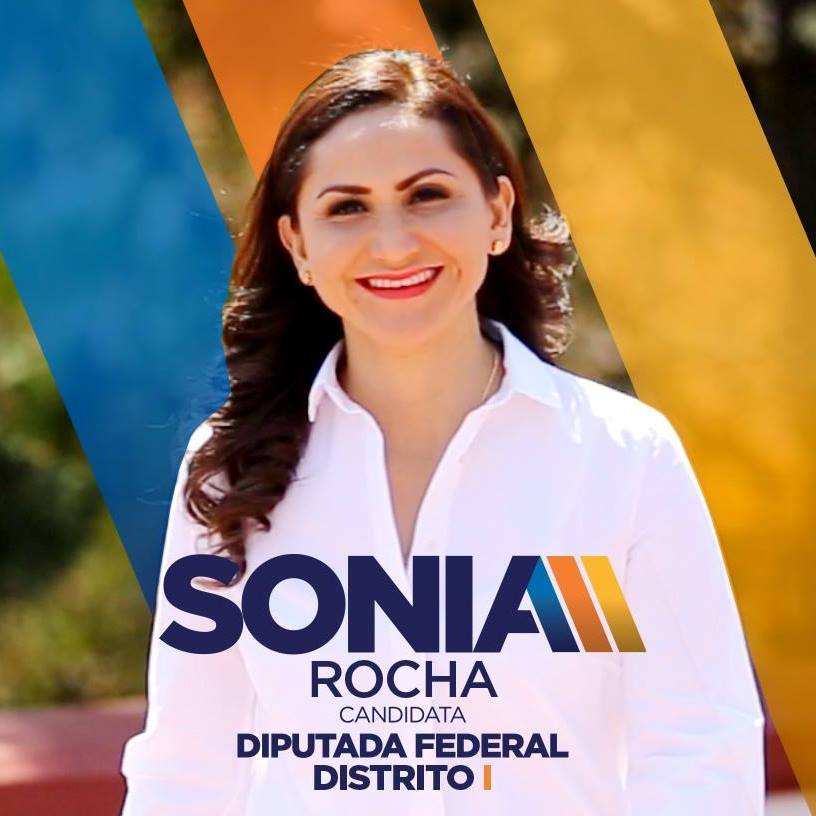
Photo of Rocha Acosta as a candidate for the Chamber of Deputies

She remained a member of the Senate until 2018. In the 2018 general election, Rocha was elected to the Chamber of Deputies, representing Querétaro's first district in the LXIV Legislature; she was re-elected to the same seat in the 2021 midterms. Her headquarters is in the city of Cadereyta de Montes. She became a member of PAN's national council in 2021.

In 2023, Rocha Acosta opposed spending proposals introduced by members of Morena in Congress, arguing it misallocated resources and would contribute to the national debt. Rocha Acosta chose not to seek reelection for the Chamber of Deputies during the 2024 Mexican general election, and instead ran to be a substitute for PAN Senate candidate Guadalupe Murguía Gutiérrez.

== Political views ==
Rocha Acosta and fellow PAN deputy Madeleine Bonnafoux Alcaraz were reported to be supporters of the National Front for the Family coalition, which opposes the legalization of abortion in Mexico. Rocha Acosta criticized comments by Morena federal deputy Miroslava Sánchez, who led the Health Commission in the Chamber of Deputies, that suggested there is a consensus among parties to legalize abortion.
