= Lophophora koehresii =

Scientific classification
- Kingdom: Plantae
- Clade: Embryophytes
- Clade: Tracheophytes
- Clade: Spermatophytes
- Clade: Angiosperms
- Clade: Eudicots
- Order: Caryophyllales
- Family: Cactaceae
- Subfamily: Cactoideae
- Genus: Lophophora
- Species: L. koehresii

Binomial name
- Lophophora koehresii (Říha) Bohata, Myšák & Šnicer,

Synonyms
- Lophophora diffusa var. koehresii

Species of cacti

Lophophora koehresii is a cactus species of the genus Lophophora found in San Luis Potosí, Mexico. It is thought to be closely related to Lophophora diffusa. Preliminary observations suggest that unlike Lophophora williamsii (peyote), Lophophora koehresii may not contain considerable amounts of mescaline or produce hallucinogenic effects. The species was first named and described as Lophophora diffusa var. koehresii in 1996 and was renamed to Lophophora koehresii in 2005.

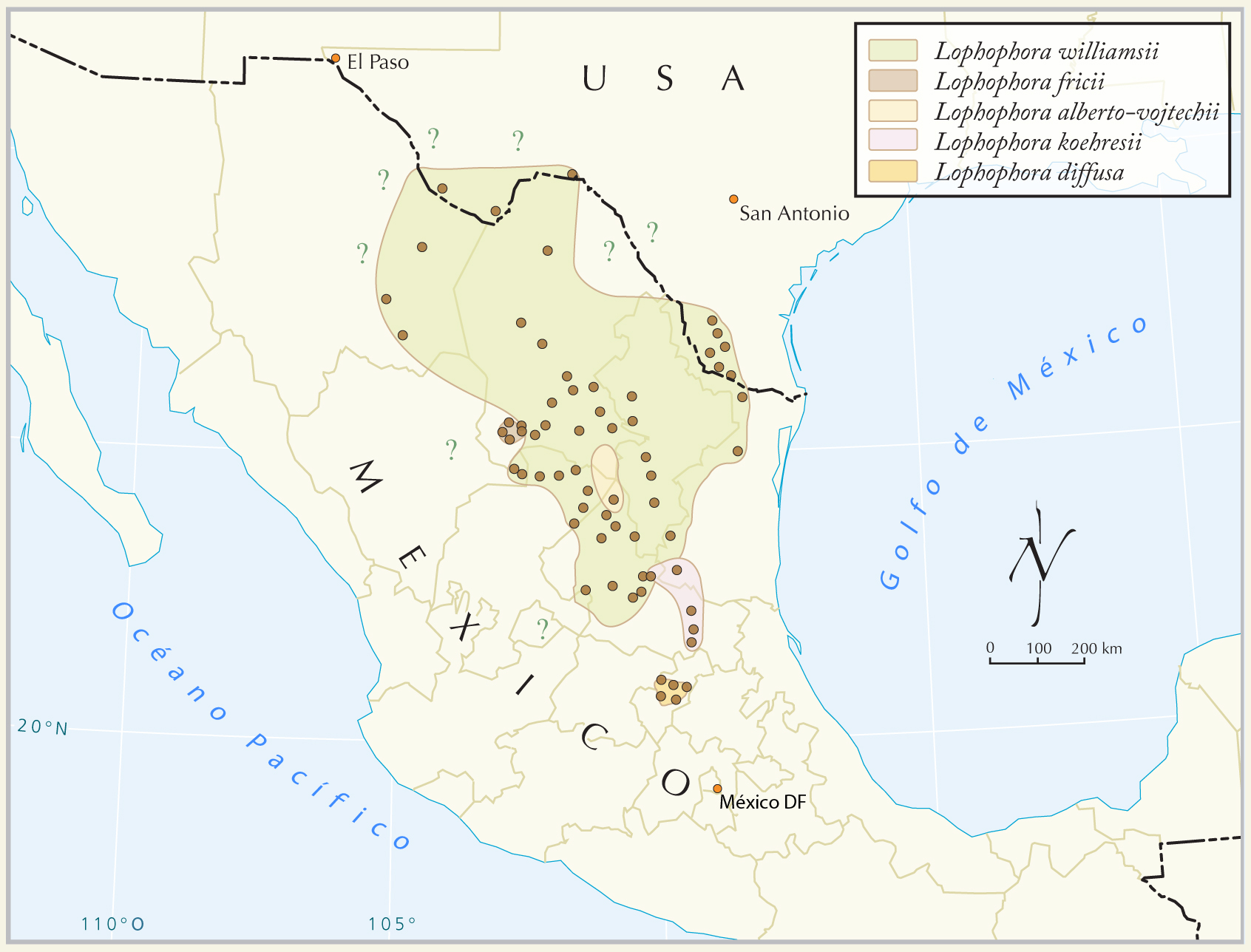
Range of wild Lophophora species, including Lophophora koehresii.
