= Miguel Martínez Peñaloza =

Mexican politician

- Born: 12 August 1977 (age 49); Cadereyta de Montes, Querétaro, Mexico
- Education: UVM
- Occupation: Politician
- Political party: PAN

Miguel Martínez Peñaloza (born 12 August 1977) is a Mexican politician from the National Action Party (PAN). From 2009 to 2012 he served as a federal deputy in the 61st Congress, representing Querétaro's first district. He also served as municipal president of Cadereyta de Montes and as a local deputy in the Congress of Querétaro.
