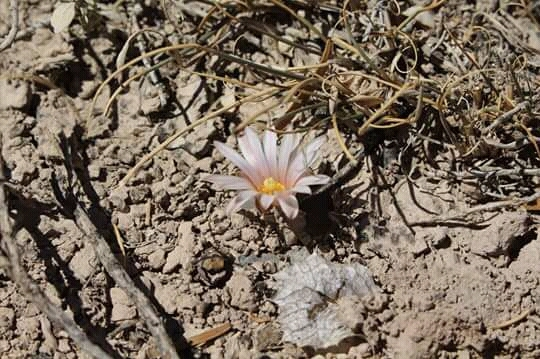

Scientific classification
- Kingdom: Plantae
- Clade: Embryophytes
- Clade: Tracheophytes
- Clade: Spermatophytes
- Clade: Angiosperms
- Clade: Eudicots
- Order: Caryophyllales
- Family: Cactaceae
- Subfamily: Cactoideae
- Genus: Lophophora
- Species: L. alberto-vojtechii

Binomial name
- Lophophora alberto-vojtechii Bohata, Myšák & Šnicer

= Lophophora alberto-vojtechii =

Species of cactus

Lophophora alberto-vojtechii is a species of Lophophora found in Mexico. It is a miniature species of Lophophora. The alkaloid content of Lophophora alberto-vojtechii has yet to be established, but probably contains much less mescaline than Lophophora williamsii (peyote) similarly to other Lophophora species such as Lophophora diffusa (false peyote). Lophophora alberto-vojtechii was first discovered in 2007 and was first described in the scientific literature in 2008 or 2009.

== Distribution ==
Lophophora alberto-vojtechii is found in northern San Luís Potosí, Mexico at elevations around 1700 meters. Plants are found in dry flats with seasonal flooding. The stems are usually retract and drive under the dried mud or covered in dust. The plants are found growing along with Ariocarpus kotschoubeyanus, Mammillaria coahuilensis, Coryphantha hintoniorum, Ferocactus pilosus, Ferocactus hamatacanthus, Mammillaria heyderi, Echinocereus enneacanthus, Glandulicactus uncinatus and Grusonia bulbispina

== See also ==
- Lophophora
