= Peñamiller Municipality =

Peñamiller
- Municipality
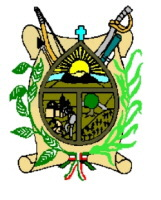
- Coat of arms
- Interactive map of Peñamiller
- Country: Mexico
- State: Querétaro
- Time zone: UTC-6 (Central)

Peñamiller is a municipality in the central Mexican state of Querétaro.

The seat is at Peñamiller.

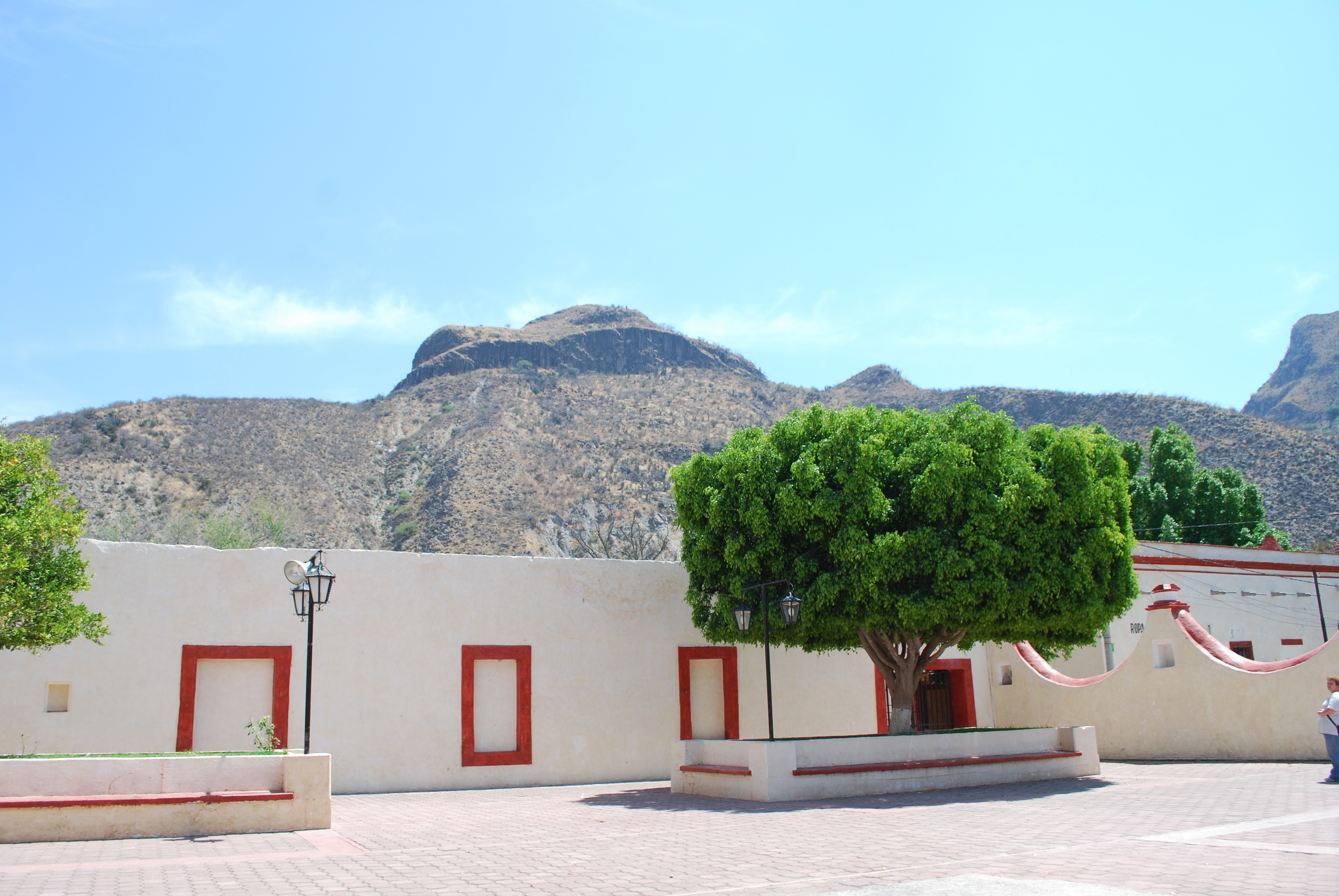
El Picacho, as seen from the parish church atrium

The town of Peñamiller is the local governing authority for over 160 communities, which together make up a territory of 694.902 km^{2}. The municipality borders the municipalities of Pinal de Amoles, Tolimán and Cadereyta de Montes on the south and east sides and with the municipalities of Xichú, Atarjea, and Catarina of the state of Guanajuato on the north and west sides. The municipality's government has one municipal president, and nine officials called regidors.

Aside from the municipal seat, important communities include San Miguel Palmas, Camargo, Río Blanco, Agua Fría, Villa Emiliano Zapata, La Plazuela and El Portugués. San Miguel Palmas is 25 km from the municipal seat and has about 640 inhabitants. It is distinguished by the making of huarache sandals which are sold in Oaxaca and other states. La Misión Dominica de San Miguel Palmas was founded in 1691 by Friar Felipe Galindo. It is a small oasis surrounded by rough terrain on which large cactus (up to ten meters tall) grow. In the town, there are large walnut trees, some of which are over 200 years old. Its church is from the 18th century, as is its old aqueduct. The town hosts a Feria de la Nuez (Nut Fair) each year on 29 September. San Miguel Palmas has a student housing unit called the General Lázaro Cárdenas del Río Albergue. It is a facility to house indigenous students from primary to technical school education who cannot commute each day to school because their homes are too far away. The facility houses about 50 children and youths and is partially funded by the federal government. The facility has a kitchen, library, patio space, multipurpose room, sports facilities and computer center as well as dormitories for boys and girls. The center also offers help with schoolwork.

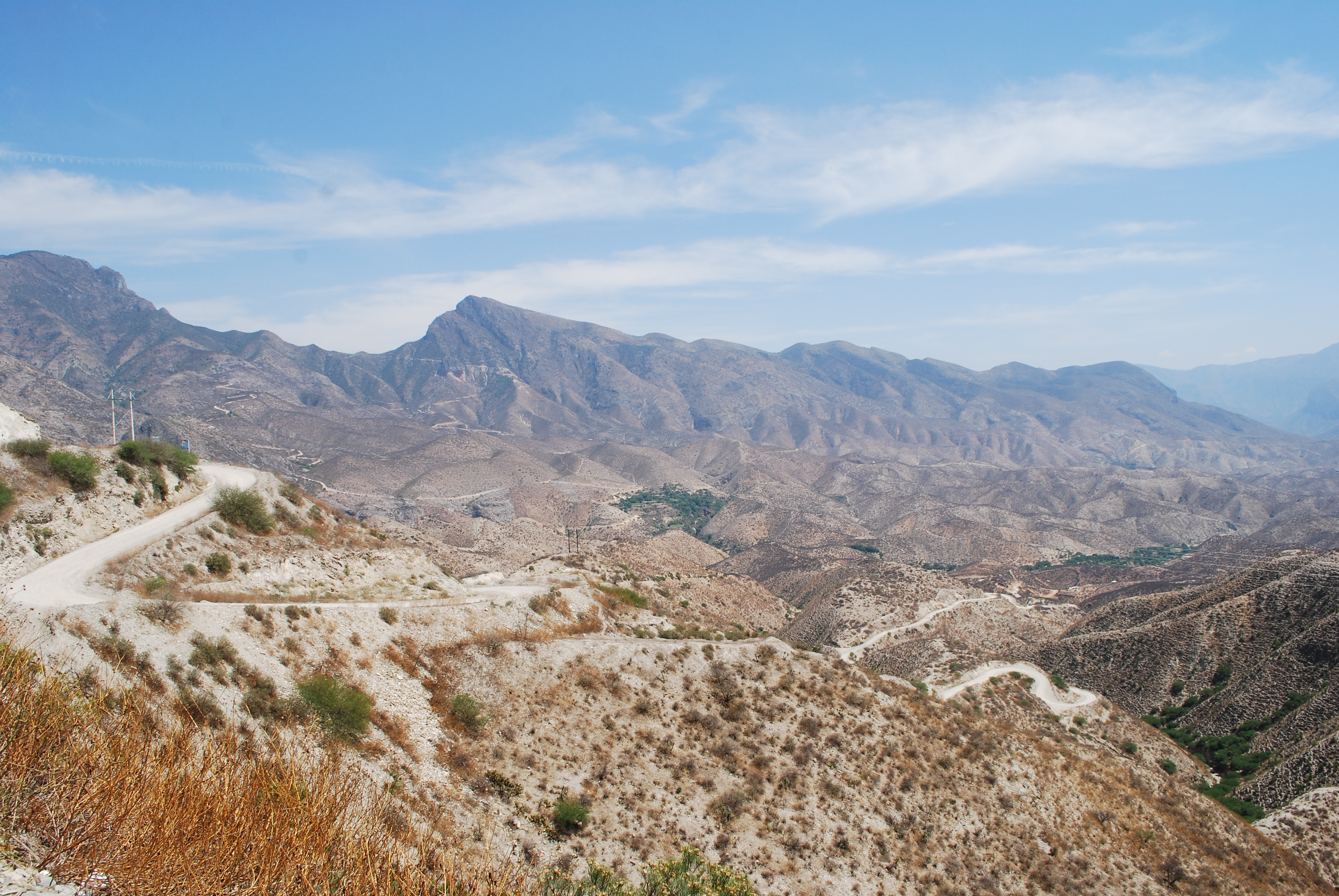
Semi desert area near La Plazuela

Río Blanco is 56 km from the municipal seat and 26 km from Camargo by dirt road. It is one of the oldest communities in the municipality, founded near the end of the 17th century because of its mineral deposits and abundance of water, as it is located next to the fresh water spring. Today, the area raises rainbow trout in tanks and has forests and significant wildlife. It has a population of about 650 people. It has a church from the 19th century and remains of gold, silver and mercury mines from its heyday, and there are still deposits of gold, silver, lead and zinc. There nearly twenty abandoned mercury mines alone as well as caves and waterfalls. The village church is from the 19th century and dedicated to the Archangel Michael and contains a “Black Christ” image. There is also an old windmill built by Gregorio Aguilar Vargas which was used to separate gold from silver. On the nearby Cerro del Sombrerete, there is an eco-tourism park with camping in the territory of white-tailed deer .

Villa Emiliano Zapata is twelve km from the municipal seat. In the municipality, it was the center of agrarian revolt during the Mexican Revolution, which resulted in the establishment of sixteen ejidos in the municipality. La Plazuela has about 650 people and is 25 km from the municipal seat. It originally was an indigenous settlement, with evidence of human occupation since the 8th century. The area was abandoned in the 13th century, but repopulated in the 20th as a mining community, which produced up to 14 tons of mercury weekly at its height. Camargo is thirty km from the municipal seat and has a population of about 1350. Its development is mostly due to the fact that it lies on the highway that connects the state capital with places such as Atarjea, Cadereyta de Montes and the Sierra Gorda. El Portugués is sixteen km from the municipal seat with a population of 525. It is a new community, having only been established in 1973.

Agua Fría is a small community founded in the 20th century. The architecture of its buildings is modern, and many are made of pink sandstone. Las Piedras Encimadas de Agua Fría (The Stacked Stones of Agua Fría) is named after enormous blocks of basalt rock near the town. These stacks will emit a sound like a bell when struck. One of these formations is reminiscent of the head of an Indian. The community of Agua Fría also has a former gold mine at the Cerro del Huacancoro.

As of 2005, there were 3,597 dwellings, of which all but about forty were privately owned. Most are built with cinderblock or stone, with half having cement floors and just over half have asbestos or metallic roofs.

There are about fifty preschools, fifty eight primary schools and eleven middle schools (ten are distance learning and one is technical in the municipal seat). Colegio de Estudios Científicos y Tecnológicos del Estado de Querétaro (CECyTEQ) is the technical high school, offering careers in nursing and electrical work. There is also a distance education site in Camargo which offers high school level studies. Education for adults is offered at the primary and middle school level for those over age 15.

Telephone service was spotty in the Sierra Gorda until the 1980s when a cell phone tower was placed in El Motoshí which allows service to more than 200 people. Most other phone service is still based on communal phone banks in various communities. Only the municipal seat and the community of San Juanico have inhome service. Mail service is limited to the municipal seat, Río Blanco and Misión de Palmas. Much of inter-governmental communication is done by radio.

There are two former haciendas, one in Boquillas and the other in Villa Emiliano Zapata. The municipality has seven other churches which include those in Agua Caliente, Boquillas, Río Blanco, two in San Miguel Palmas and two in Villa Emiliano Zapata.
