= Tolimán Municipality =

Tolimán Municipality may refer to:

- Tolimán Municipality, Jalisco
- Tolimán Municipality, Querétaro
