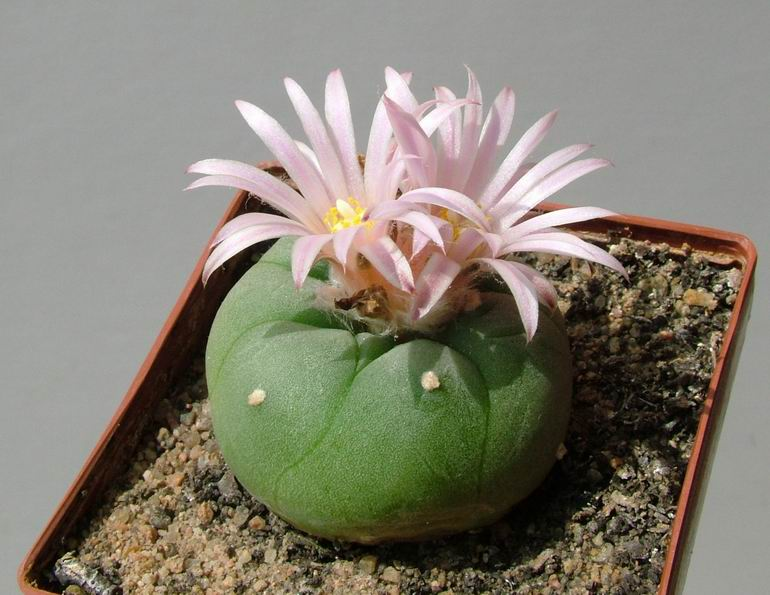

Scientific classification
- Kingdom: Plantae
- Clade: Embryophytes
- Clade: Tracheophytes
- Clade: Spermatophytes
- Clade: Angiosperms
- Clade: Eudicots
- Order: Caryophyllales
- Family: Cactaceae
- Subfamily: Cactoideae
- Genus: Lophophora
- Species: L. fricii

Binomial name
- Lophophora fricii Haberm. 1975

Synonyms
- Lophophora diffusa subsp. fricii (Haberm.) Halda 1997; Lophophora williamsii var. fricii (Haberm.) Grym 1997; Peyotl zacatensis var. fricii (Haberm.) Sotom. 2001

= Lophophora fricii =

Species of cacti

Lophophora fricii, also known as false peyote, is a species of Lophophora found in Mexico.

== Constituents and effects ==
In terms of total alkaloid content, Lophophora fricii contains 65.4% pellotine, 25.4% anhalonidine, and 1.0% mescaline. For comparison, Lophophora williamsii (peyote) contains 30% mescaline, 17% pellotine, and 14% anhalonidine, whereas Lophophora diffusa (false peyote) contains 86% pellotine, 3.8% anhalonidine, and 1.2% mescaline. In contrast to peyote, false peyotes like Lophophora fricii and Lophophora diffusa are said to not produce hallucinogenic effects. Whereas mescaline is a psychedelic drug, pellotine and anhalonidine are known to produce sedative and hypnotic effects.

== See also ==
- Lophophora
