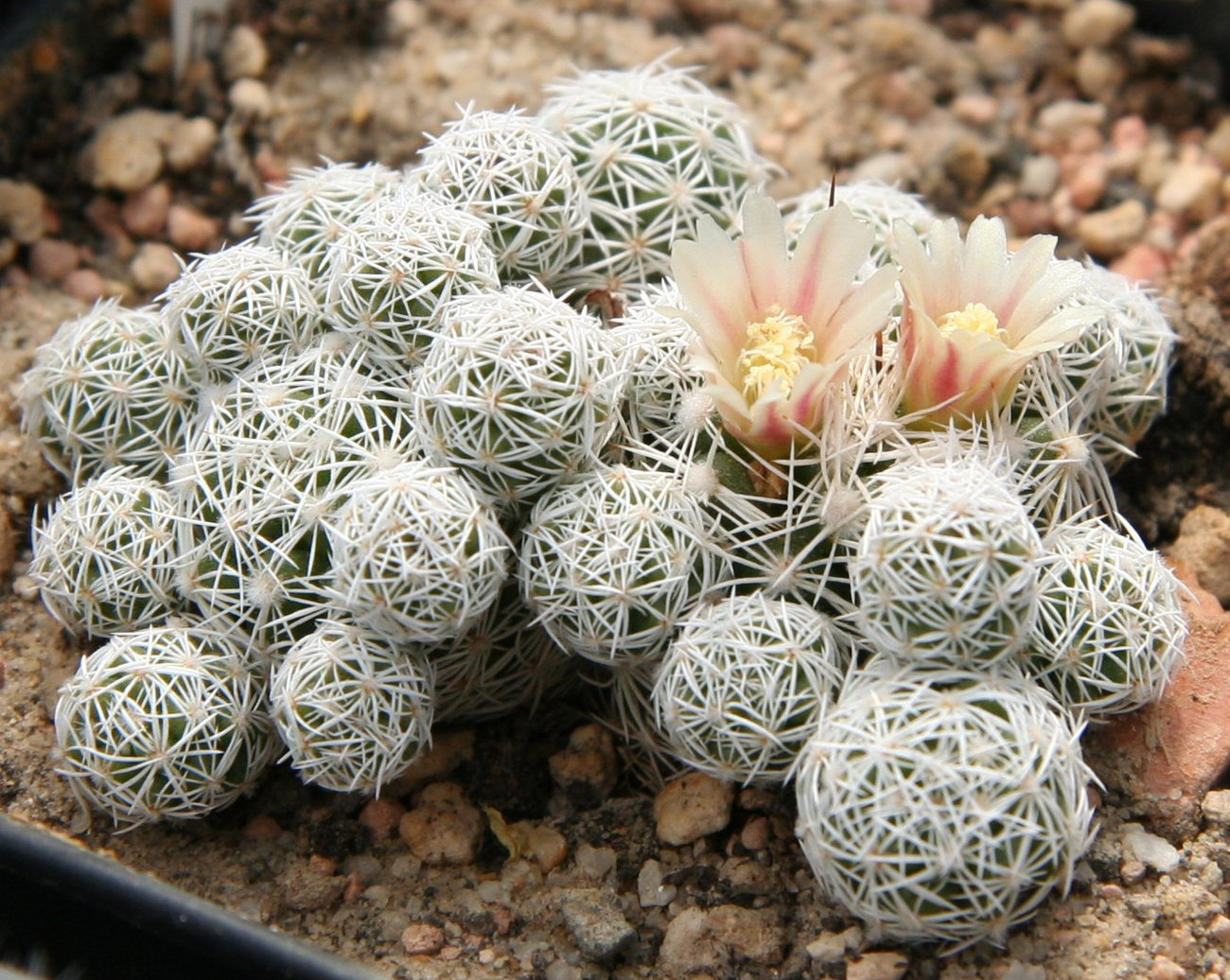
- M. vetula subsp. gracilis

Conservation status
- Least Concern (IUCN 3.1)

Scientific classification
- Kingdom: Plantae
- Clade: Tracheophytes
- Clade: Angiosperms
- Clade: Eudicots
- Order: Caryophyllales
- Family: Cactaceae
- Subfamily: Cactoideae
- Genus: Mammillaria
- Species: M. vetula

Binomial name
- Mammillaria vetula Mart., 1832

Synonyms
- Mammillaria gracilis

= Mammillaria vetula =

Species of cactus

Mammillaria vetula, the thimble cactus, is a species of nipple cactus in the subfamily Cactoideae. It is native to the Mexican states of Hidalgo, Guanajuato and Querétaro. Two subspecies are recognized M. vetula subsp. vetula and M. vetula subsp. gracilis. While the former is usually considered too plain to be grown as an ornamental plant, the latter is one of the most widespread mammillarias in cultivation.

== Taxonomy ==
Mammillaria vetula comprises two subspecies, M. vetula subsp. vetula and M. vetula subsp. gracilis, which were originally thought to be distinct species. M. kuentziana and M. magneticola are considered synonyms of M. vetula subsp. vetula. The specific epithet vetula means "little old one". The common name "thimble cactus" refers to the resemblance of the stems to little thimbles.

== Description ==
Mammillaria vetula is a succulent subshrub which forms clusters of globose to short-cylindric, bluish-green stems with axils that may be naked or slightly woolly. In M. vetula subsp. vetula, young plants have 25 to 40 radial spines, increasing to 50 as they mature, and they remain white. Central spines number 1 or 2, but up to 5 to 9 have been observed in some specimens in Hidalgo. These spines are reddish-brown and about 10 mm long. The flowers are funnel-shaped, lemon-yellow, approximately 15 mm in length and width, with white (sometimes orange-yellow) stigmas. The fruit is dull pink, and the seeds are black.

Mammillaria vetula subsp. gracilis is prolific, producing offsets that detach easily. Its stems are cylindrical, up to 13 cm long and 1 to 3 cm wide, with naked axils. It has 11 to 16 radial spines, 3 to 8 mm long, bristle-like, and chalky white (sometimes tipped brown in smaller variants). Central spines are absent or number up to 5 in mature plants, measuring 10 to 12 mm long and stronger than radials, either white or dark brown. The flowers are 12 mm long and wide, pale yellow with a pinkish or brownish midstripe. The fruit is small, red or pinkish-white, with black seeds. A form with smaller stems and brown spines also exists and is sometimes labeled M. fragilis or M. gracilis var. pulchella; the botanist David Hunt considers it a cultivar.

== Distribution and habitat ==
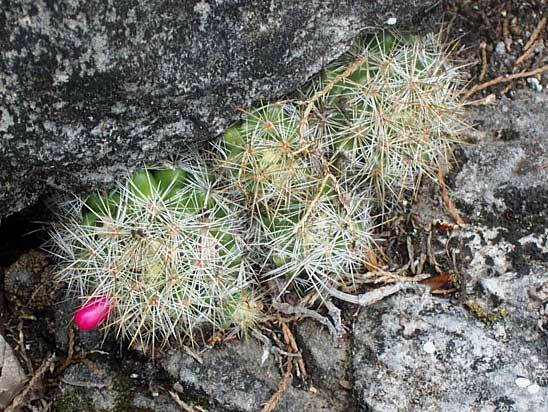
M. vetula subsp. vetula in its natural habitat, a rocky slope at about 1800 m above sea level

Mammillaria vetula grows primarily in the desert and dry shrubland. M. mammillaria subsp. vetula is found in the Mexican states of Hidalgo, Guanajuato, and Querétaro, at altitudes of 1,600 to 3,350 meters. At the highest altitudes it is often covered by snow and ice. Specific locations include San José del Oro, La Encarnación, Sierra de Jalapa, and Vizarrón. M. vetula subsp. gracilis is known from Hidalgo and Querétaro, occurring at altitudes of 1,200 to 1,850 meters. Locations include Puente de Dios, San Onofre, Tolantongo, Barranca Xilitla, San Pedro Gilo, Ixmiquilpan, Metztitlan. The type specimen was collected in leaf litter under shrubs on limestone rocks.

== Cultivation ==
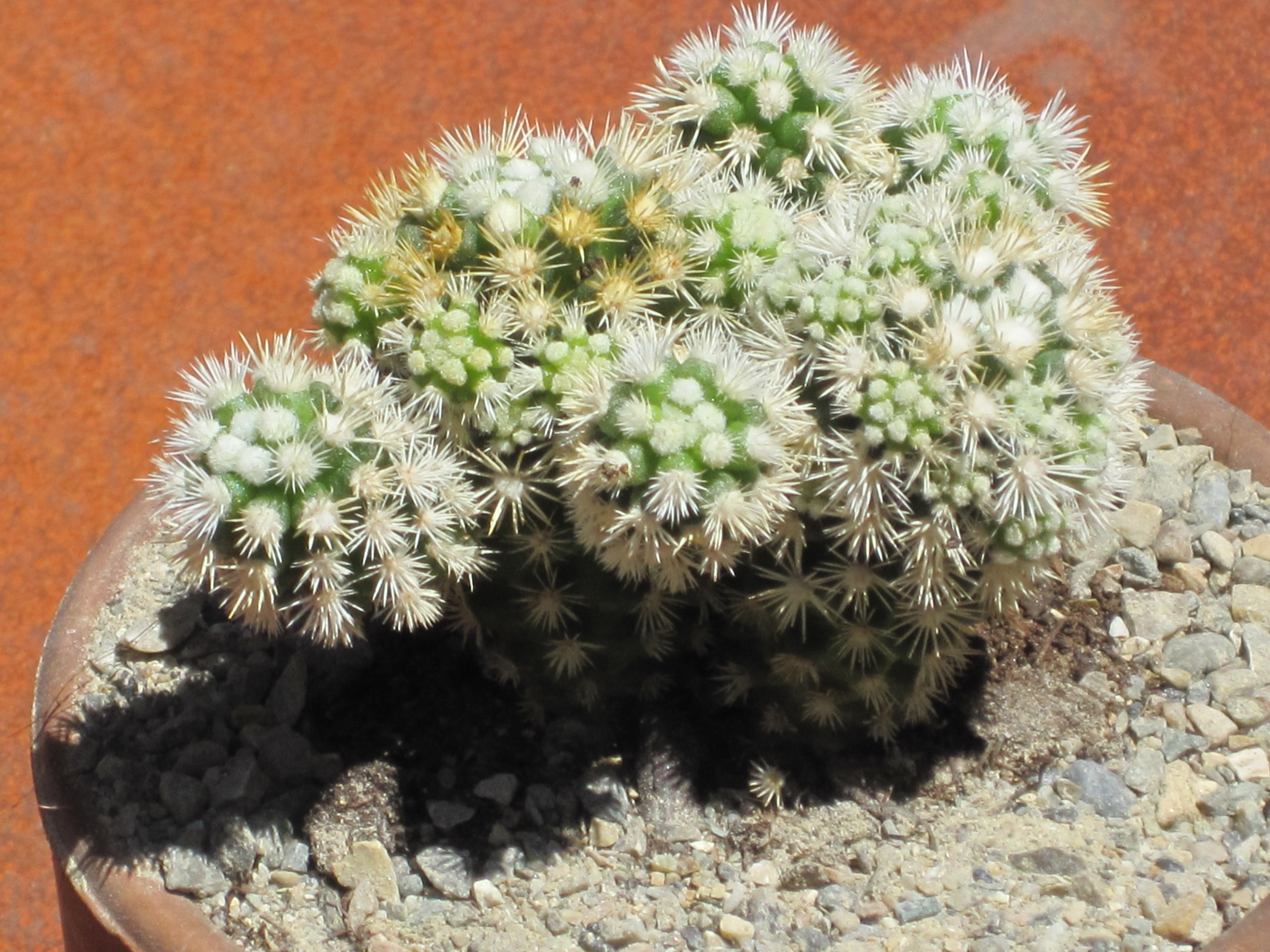
M. vetula subsp. gracilis cv. Arizona Snowcap is one of the popular cultivars.

Mammillaria vetula comprises both the least common mammillaria in cultivation and the most common one. Sometime after the 1970s or 1980s, the type subspecies, M. vetula subsp. vetula, fell out of popularity. The cacti nurseryman John Pilbeam speculates that, because of its plain spination and inconspicuous flowers, it was replaced by showier species. Plants grown in full sun develop the best spination and produce the best blooms, and Pilbeam considers such plants to be "a worthy addition to any collection". Pilbeam estimates that, because it breaks up into propagable pieces at the slightest touch and poses no problems in cultivation, M. vetula subsp. gracilis is "probably the most commonly grown" mammillaria. He notes that it is commonly offered at plant sale events, "except paradoxically at cactus-oriented events, where it would be ignominious to offer it".

Mammillaria vetula are tough plants, but require good drainage and do best in sandy soil left to dry out between waterings. Plants require a winter rest in a cold location, without watering, to encourage springtime blooming. It may be grown as a houseplant, in rock gardens, or in xeriscapes. Cultivars include 'Oruga Blanca', 'Roi Baudouin I', and 'Snow Cap'.
