= Timoteo Martínez Pérez =

Mexican politician

- Born: 22 December 1956 (age 69); San Joaquín, Querétaro, Mexico
- Died: February 2, 2021
- Occupation: Politician
- Political party: PRI

José Timoteo Martínez Pérez (born 22 December 1956) is a Mexican politician from the institutional Revolutionary Party (PRI). From 2000 to 2003 he served as a federal deputy in the 58th Congress, representing Querétaro's first district. He also served as municipal president of San Joaquín, Querétaro, from 1991 to 1994.
