= José Ignacio Rubio Chávez =

Mexican politician

- Born: 18 July 1954 (age 72); Querétaro, Mexico
- Died: 11 July 2022; Queretaro
- Education: Autonomous University of Queretaro
- Occupation: Politician
- Political party: PAN

José Ignacio Alberto Rubio Chávez (born 18 July 1954) is a Mexican politician from the National Action Party (PAN). From 2006 to 2009 he served as a federal deputy in the 60th Congress, representing Querétaro's first district.
