= Rodrigo Iván Cortés Jiménez =

Mexican politician

- Born: 4 September 1971 (age 54); State of Mexico, Mexico
- Education: Universidad Panamericana
- Occupation: Politician
- Political party: PAN

Rodrigo Iván Cortés Jiménez (born 4 September 1971) is a Mexican activist and former politician. He is the head of the National Front for the Family, a social conservative organization. As of 2014, he served as a National Action Party (PAN) deputy in the LIX Legislature as a plurinominal representative.

== Biography ==
Cortés Jiménez was convicted of gender-based political violence over transphobic comments on Twitter targeting Salma Luévano, a transgender member of Congress. His conviction was upheld by the Superior Chamber of the Electoral Tribunal of the Federal Judicial Power.
