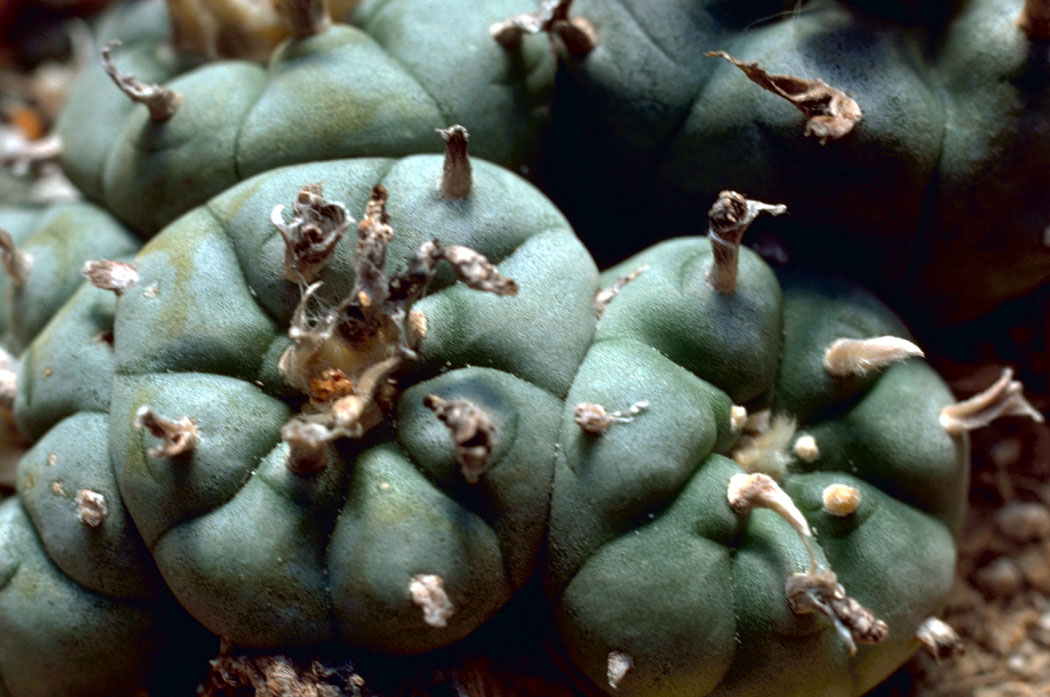
- Lophophora williamsii cluster

Scientific classification
- Kingdom: Plantae
- Clade: Embryophytes
- Clade: Tracheophytes
- Clade: Angiosperms
- Clade: Eudicots
- Order: Caryophyllales
- Family: Cactaceae
- Subfamily: Cactoideae
- Tribe: Cacteae
- Genus: Lophophora; J.M.Coult.

Species
- Lophophora diffusa; Lophophora williamsii - Peyote
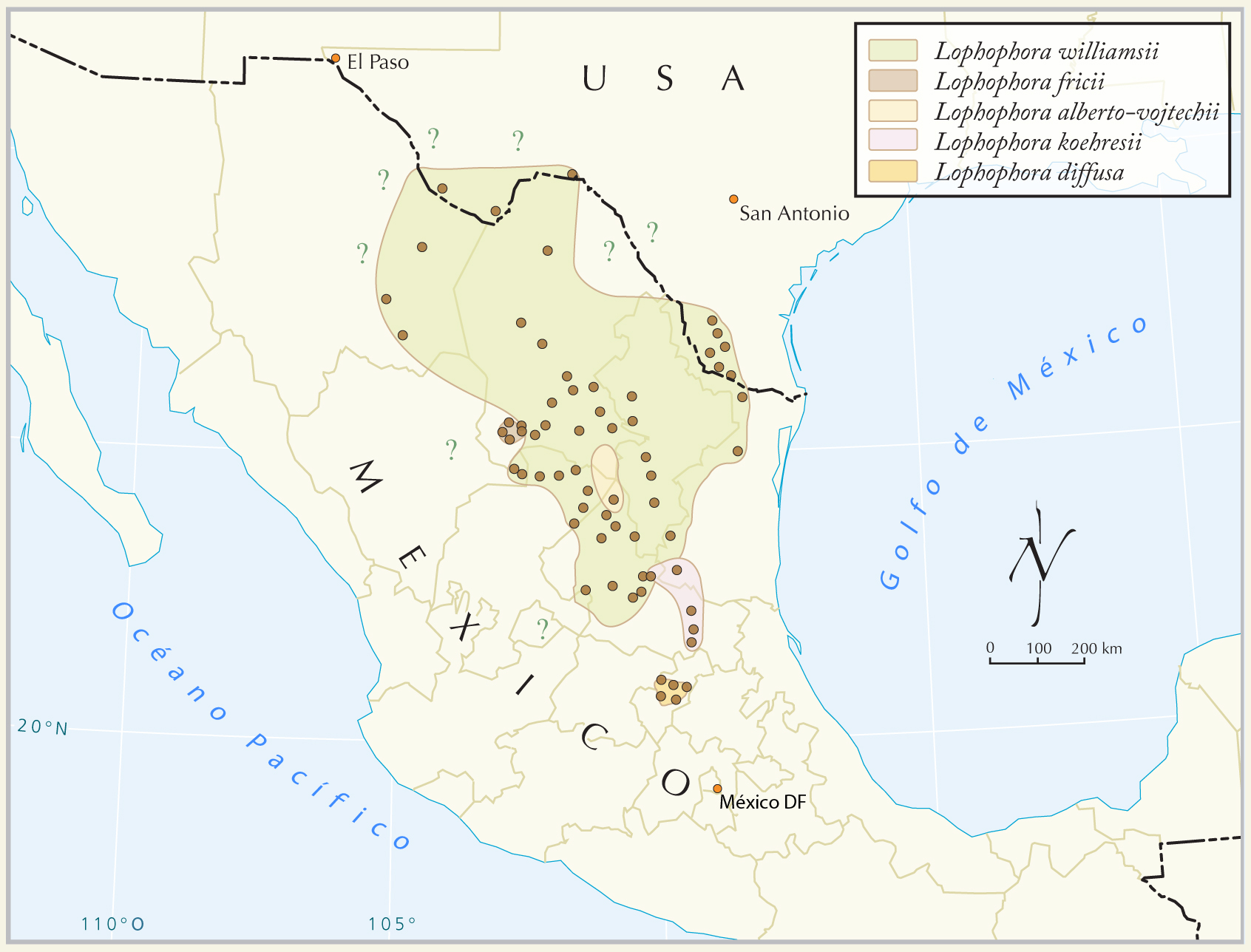
- Lophophora range

Synonyms
- Peyotl F.Hern. nom. inval.

= Lophophora =

Genus of cacti

Lophophora (/ləˈfɒfərə/) is a genus of spineless, button-like cacti. Its native range covers Texas through Mexico to southwestern Mexico. The species are extremely slow growing, taking around ten years to reach maturity from seed in the wild. Growth can be accelerated considerably in cultivation by grafting. The slow rate of reproduction and over-harvesting render the species under threat in the wild; both L. williamsii and L. diffusa are assessed as Vulnerable on the IUCN Red List.

== Taxonomy ==
Lophophora means "crest-bearing", referring to the tufts of trichomes that adorn each tubercle. Lophophora has been reported to have two species, L. diffusa and L. williamsii. Another three species have been proposed by some authors, including Jaroslav Šnicer, Vojtěch Myšák and Jaroslav Bohata: L. fricii, L. koehresii, and L. alberto-vojtechii. Recent DNA sequencing studies (Butterworth et al. 2002) have shown that L. diffusa and L. williamsii indeed are distinct species. DNA evidence from the alleged species L. fricii and L. koehresii would allow for more accurate classification.

=== Species ===
As of 2018, only about six species of Lophophora are known.

Image	Scientific name	Description	Distribution
	Lophophora alberto-vojtechii Bohata, Myšák & Šnicer	Plants have gray green stems, typically reaching up to 2 cm in diameter	Mexico (San Luis Potosí)
	Lophophora diffusa (Croizat) Bravo	The plants are yellow-green, usually lacking well-defined ribs and furrows. The podaria are rarely elevated, but are broad and flat. The tufts of hair are usually spread unequally on the prominent podaria. The flowers are commonly whitish to yellowish-white. This species contains zero to trace amounts of mescaline; pellotine is the principal alkaloid.	south end of the range of the genus in Querétaro state, Mexico
	Lophophora fricii Haberm.		Mexico Northeast
	Lophophora williamsii (Lemaire ex Salm-Dyck) J.M.Coult.	The plants are blue-green, usually with well-defined ribs and furrows. The tufts of hair are usually equally spaced on the ribs. The flowers are pinkish or rarely whitish. The mescaline content of the dried crown typically ranges from about 2% to 4% by weight.	the full range of the genus except in Querétaro state, Mexico

Two other species, Lophophora koehresii and Lophophora jourdaniana, have also been described and named.

== Cultivation ==
Lophophora williamsii is regarded as trouble-free in cultivation, growing well on its own roots in a largely mineral, free-draining substrate in a sunny to semi-shaded position, while the other species are considered more sensitive. Plants are propagated from fresh seed, by grafting, or from cuttings.

== Constituents and effects ==
Lophophora williamsii (peyote) is the only known species with large amounts of the psychedelic drug mescaline (~30% of total alkaloid content), whereas other species have only trace amounts of mescaline (e.g., 1%) and instead contain large amounts of other alkaloids such as pellotine and anhalonidine. Due to their low mescaline content, other Lophophora species besides peyote are said to have little or no hallucinogenic activity.

== History ==
Lophophora williamsii (peyote), as Echinocactus williamsii, was first described and named by the French horticulturist Jean François Cels in 1842. Its naming is often erroneously attributed to German amateur botanist Joseph zu Salm-Reifferscheidt-Dyck in 1845. The French botanist Charles Antoine Lemaire also described and named the species as Echinocactus williamsianus in 1843. German botanist Paul Christoph Hennings named the species Anhalonium lewinii, in honor of Louis Lewin who provided him with his specimens, in 1888 as well. The species was renamed to its present-day accepted name Lophophora williamsii by American botanist John Merle Coulter in 1894.

Lophophora diffusa was first described and named in 1967, Lophophora fricii in 1975, and Lophophora alberto-vojtechii in 2008 or 2009. Lophophora diffusa was confused with Lophophora williamsii for many decades and this caused significant scientific confusion. A couple of other species, Lophophora koehresii and Lophophora jourdaniana, have also been described and named.
