= Delvim Fabiola Bárcenas =

Mexican politician

- Born: 16 January 1977 (age 49); Querétaro, Mexico
- Occupation: Deputy
- Political party: PRI

Delvim Fabiola Bárcenas Nieves (born 16 January 1977) is a Mexican politician and lawyer affiliated with the Institutional Revolutionary Party (PRI). In 2012–2015 she served as a federal deputy in the 57th Congress, representing Querétaro's first district.
