= José Alfonso Muñoz Muñoz =

Mexican politician

- Born: 31 October 1961 (age 63); Río Verde, San Luis Potosí, Mexico
- Occupation: Politician

José Alfonso Muñoz Muñoz (born 31 October 1961) is a Mexican politician. In 2003–2006 he served as a federal deputy in the 59th Congress, representing Querétaro's first district as an independent.
