= Cadereyta de Montes Municipality =

City and municipality in Querétaro, Mexico

Cadereyta de Montes
- Municipality
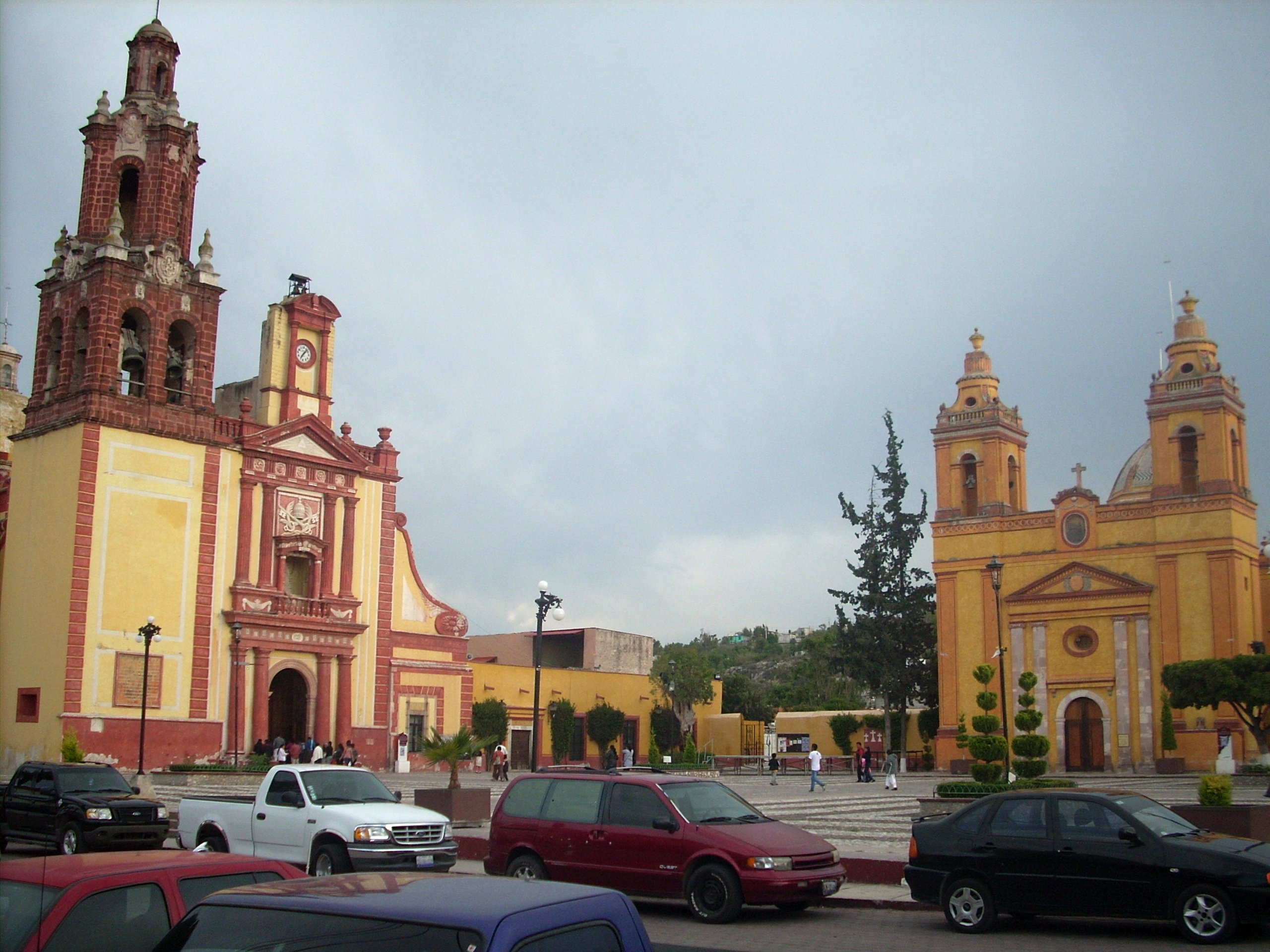
- Cadereyta city centre

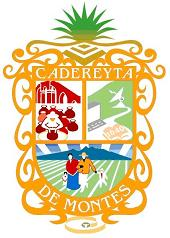
- Coat of arms

- Coordinates: 19°54′34″N 99°08′41″W
- Country: Mexico
- State: Querétaro
- Municipal seat: Cadereyta
- Municipal Status: 1818
- Named after: Lope Díez de Armendáriz, 1st Marquess of Cadreita and Ezequiel Montes

Government
  - Municipal President: Astrid Alejandra Ortega Vázquez
- Elevation (of seat): 2,200 m (7,200 ft)

Population (2010)
  - Municipality: 33,907
  - Seat: 20,610
- Time zone: UTC-6 (CST)
- Postal code (of seat): 55650
- Website: (in Spanish) http://www.cadereytademontesqueretaro.gob.mx/

Cadereyta de Montes (Spanish: [kaðeˈɾejta ðe ˈmontes]) is a city and municipality in the Mexican state of Querétaro. The municipality is the second most extensive in the state.

It was a post from which the main trade routes were defended from attacks by the indigenous people of the Sierra Gorda.

== History ==
Approximately 7,000 years ago, the Cadereyta region was inhabited by various nomad groups who hunted and collected food to sustain themselves [1]. Wooden tools used by hunter-gatherers, including an atlatl, el Atlatl Violeta, were found by the AEQ - Asociación de Espeleólogos de Querétaro, Querétaro Grotto, in the Cueva del Tesoro and radiocarbon dated to between 7 and 132 CE.

Some of these indigenous groups were the Chichimecas, Pame, and Jonace. These groups were some of the primary inhabitants until the arrival of the Spaniards, the indigenous groups continuously pushed back and fought against the Spanish. From this conflict arose a wave of peace campaigns, which were undertaken by religious missionaries who came from Tecozautla and Huichapan, and the military [2]. In 1639, Lope Díez de Armendáriz, 1st Marquess of Cadreita fully supported the peace campaigns, which were being led by Captain Alonso of Tovar Guzman. The captain later named the city of Cadereyta in memory of the Marquess of Cadereyta [2]. Around 1640 the Spaniards established the Villa de Cadereyta [1].

Today Cadereyta is considered one of the pueblos magicos, or magical cities, due to its colonial architecture seen in its churches, extensive culture, and various historical monuments.

== Demography ==
The population of the municipality grew from 51,688 in 2000 to 57,204 in 2005.

Settlement	Population
Total Municipality	69,075
Cadereyta	12,199
El Palmar	2,702
Vizarrón	1,952
Boyé	1,854
San Javier	1,692
Higuerillas	1,473
Villa Guerrero	1,445
El Rincón	1,088
El Doctor	189
Charco Frío	481
La Esperanza	124
