= National Front for the Family =

- Frente Nacional por la Familia
- Formation: 2016
- Location: Mexico
- Official language: Spanish
- President: Rodrigo Iván Cortés Jiménez
- Website: frentenacional.mx

The National Front for the Family (Spanish: Frente Nacional por la Familia) is a Mexican social conservative organization, sometimes identified as a far-right movement, founded in 2016. The organization is led by Rodrigo Iván Cortés Jiménez, a former federal deputy for the National Action Party (PAN). The National Front for the Family opposes proposals to legalize abortion and same-sex marriage.

== History ==
The National Front for the Family formed in 2016 in opposition to efforts supported by then-President Enrique Peña Nieto to legalize same-sex marriage. The initiative would've also allowed homosexuals to adopt children and established no-fault divorce. Peña Nieto's proposal was ultimately rejected by Congress, and his party lost 7 of 12 governorships later the same year.

The organization is opposed to efforts to legalize same-sex marriage and abortion in Mexico.

== Leadership and organization ==
The organization is led by Rodrigo Iván Cortés Jiménez, a former member of the Chamber of Deputies for the National Action Party (PAN).

== Support ==
Brian S. Brown has said, "The National March for the Family has the potential of being the largest single demonstration of support for marriage, children and parental rights in history." The organization has received support from PAN deputies Sonia Rocha Acosta and Madeleine Bonnafoux Alcaraz.
