= Gudiños =

Coordinates: 20°53′N 100°01′W

Gudiños is a small town in the state of Querétaro, Mexico, located between the towns of Colón and Tolimán. The town has 400 inhabitants and a 7000-acre (28 km²) ranch and hacienda called the Small Property of Gudiños.
