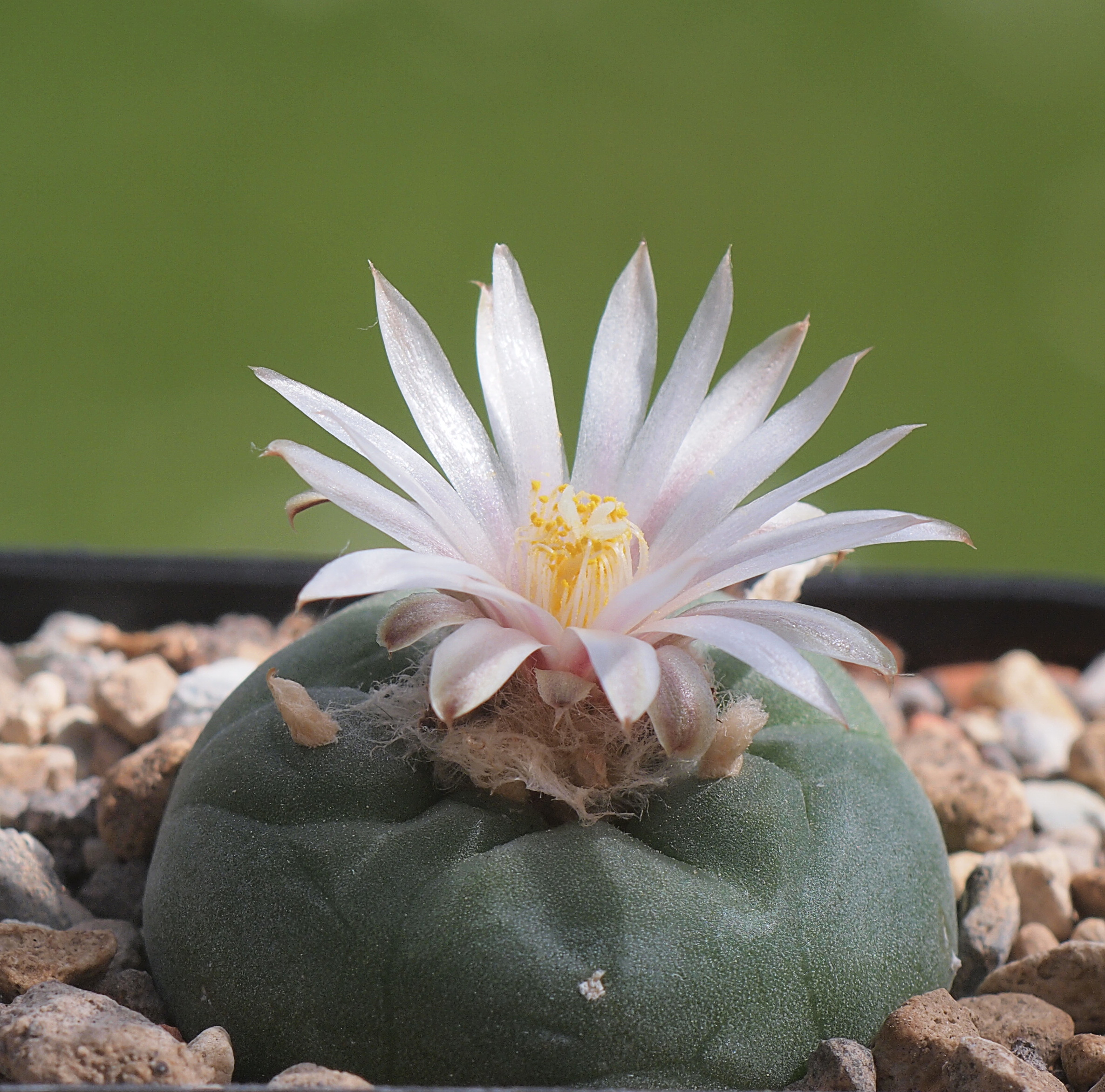

Conservation status
- Vulnerable (IUCN 3.1)

Scientific classification
- Kingdom: Plantae
- Clade: Tracheophytes
- Clade: Angiosperms
- Clade: Eudicots
- Order: Caryophyllales
- Family: Cactaceae
- Subfamily: Cactoideae
- Genus: Lophophora
- Species: L. diffusa

Binomial name
- Lophophora diffusa (Croizat) Bravo
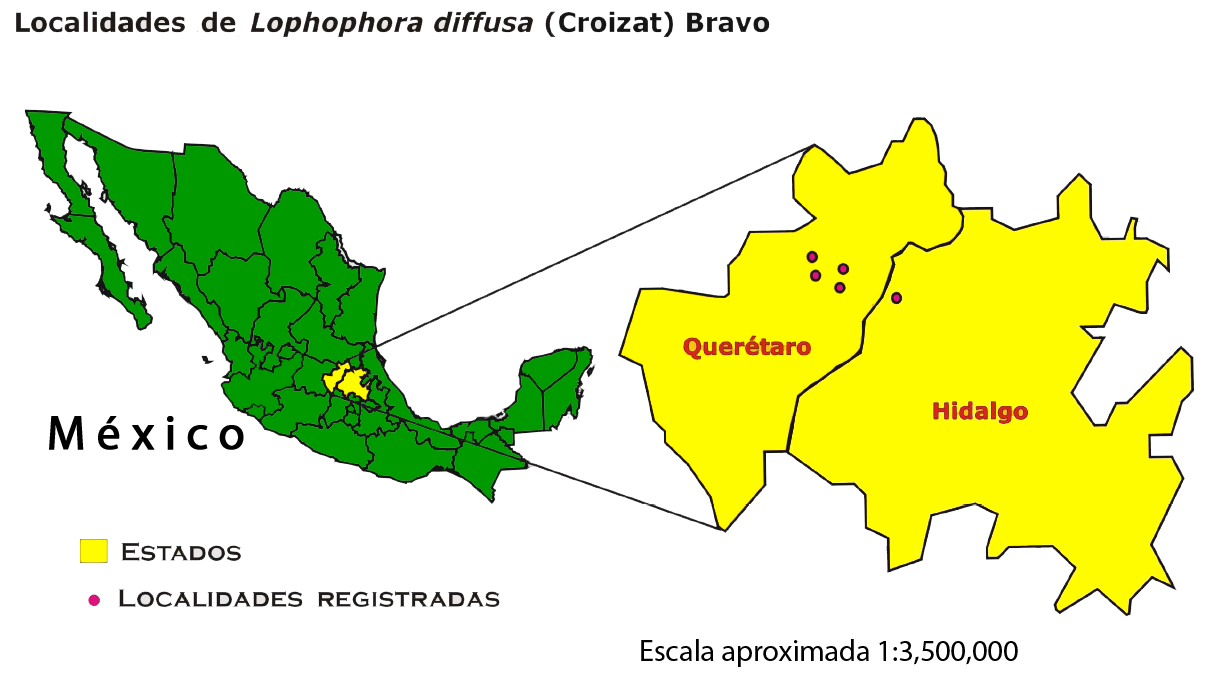

Synonyms
- Lophophora echinata var. diffusa Croizat 1944; Lophophora williamsii var. diffusa (Croizat) G.D.Rowley 1976 publ. 1979; Lophophora williamsii subsp. diffusa (Croizat) Scheinvar 2004; Peyotl diffusus (Croizat) Sotom., Arred. & Mart.Mend. 2001; Lophophora diffusa var. koehresii Říha 1996; Lophophora diffusa subsp. kubesae Halda, Kupčák & Malina 2002; Lophophora diffusa var. swobodaiana Halda, Kupčák & Malina 2002; Lophophora diffusa subsp. viridescens Halda 1997; Lophophora koehresii (Říha) Bohata, Myšák & Šnicer 2005; Lophophora viridescens (Halda) Halda 1997; Lophophora williamsii var. koehresii (Říha) Grym 1997; Peyotl viridescens (Halda) Sotom., Arred. & Mart.Mend. 2001; Lophophora echinata var. diffusa Croizat

= Lophophora diffusa =

Species of cactus

Lophophora diffusa, commonly known as false peyote, is a species of plant in the family Cactaceae and one of the species in the Lophophora genus. It is endemic to Mexico in the outskirts of Querétaro. This species contains only trace amounts of the psychedelic alkaloid mescaline. Instead, the sedative pellotine is the principal alkaloid. The species name diffusa refers to the flat tubercles that are outspread without the plant having prominent ribs.

== Description ==
Lophophora diffusa typically grows as a solitary plant or in groups. Its yellow-green, soft, and somewhat flattened succulent stems reach heights of 2–7 cm (0.79–2.76 in) and diameters of 5–12 cm (2.0–4.7 in). The podaria are rarely elevated, but are broad and flat. The plant lacks ribs, and its wide, flat cusps have small areoles (2–3 mm) with no spines. It has a broad, shallow, tuber-like root, and tufts of hair are unevenly distributed. The flowers are white to slightly pink or yellowish-white, measuring 1.3–2.2 cm (0.51–0.87 in) in diameter.

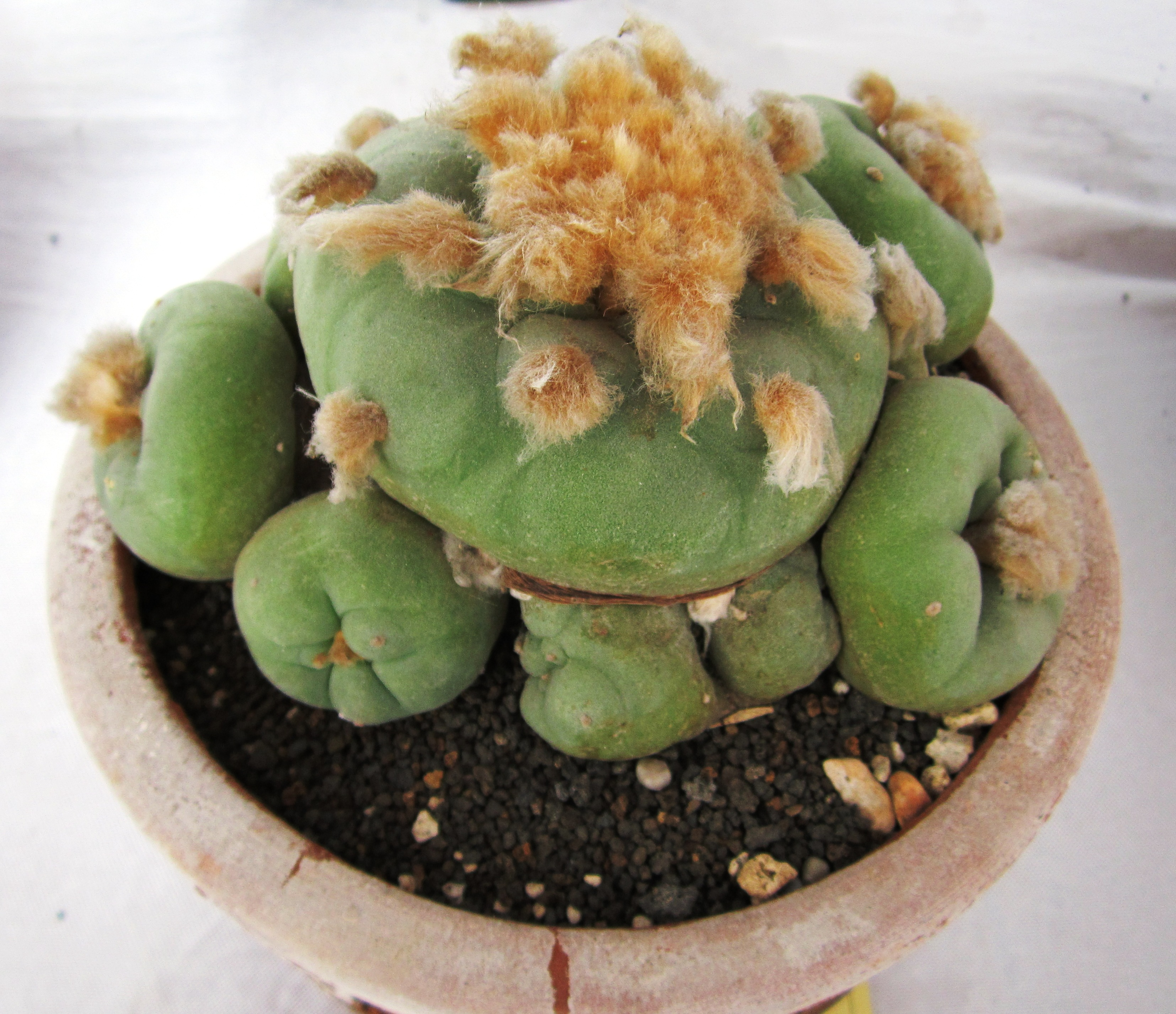
Plant

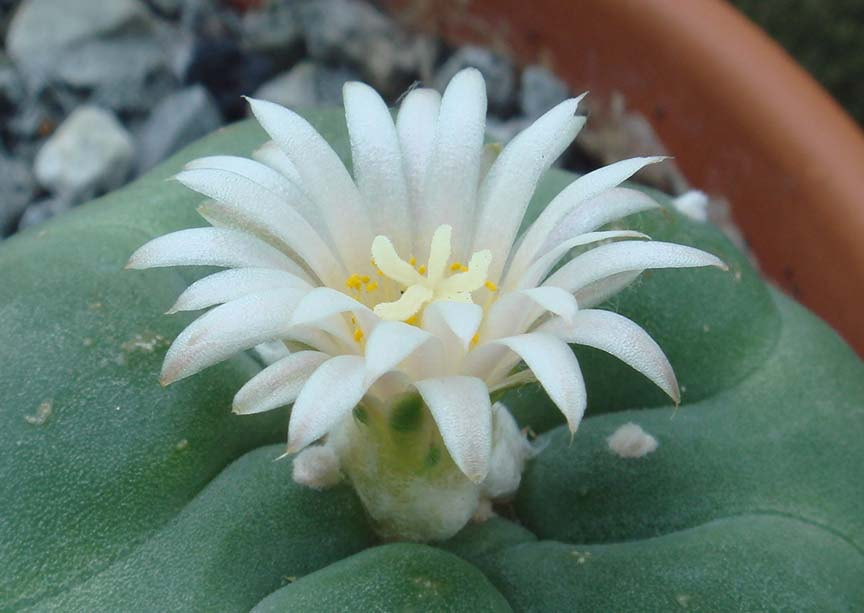
Flower

== Distribution ==
This species is the southernmost representative of the genus Lophophora, thriving in limestone soils within a small area of approximately 775 km^{2} (299 sq mi) between Vizarrón, Bucareli, and Tolimán in Querétaro, Mexico, with minor occurrences in Hidalgo. Its natural habitat is semi-deserts on slopes and river beds, and under the shade of various shrubs and nurse plants such as Larrea tridentata and Senegalia sororia. It grows at altitudes of 1,000–2,000 metres (3,280–6,560 ft) above sea level, forming isolated and self-regulated populations in the Estórax River depression. It is considered vulnerable due to a very small distribution range, small population of less than 3,000 individuals, and illegal collecting. It is collected illegally by people seeking peyote, and as an ornamental plant.

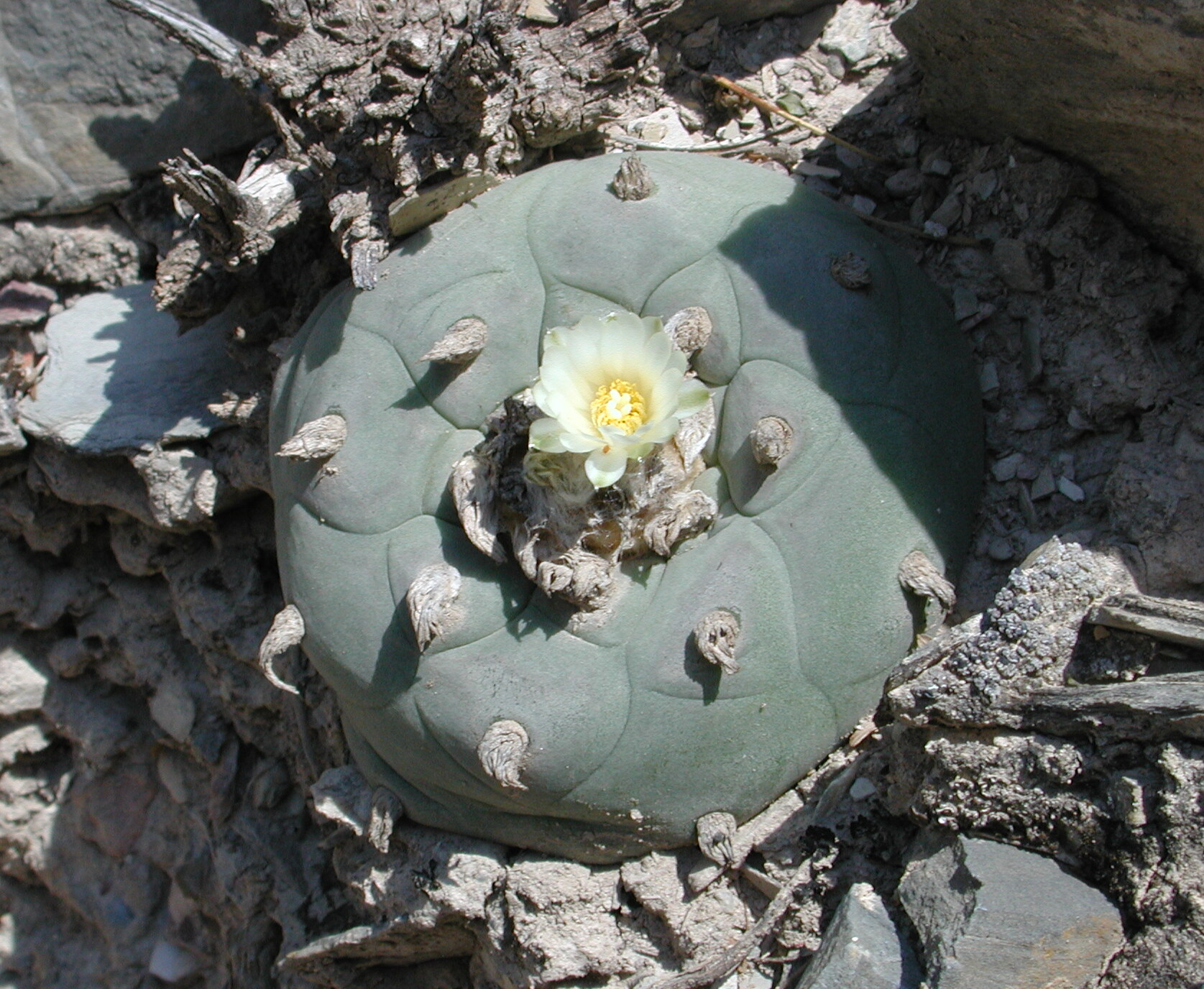
Blooming plant in habitat near Vizarron, Quéretaro, Mexico.

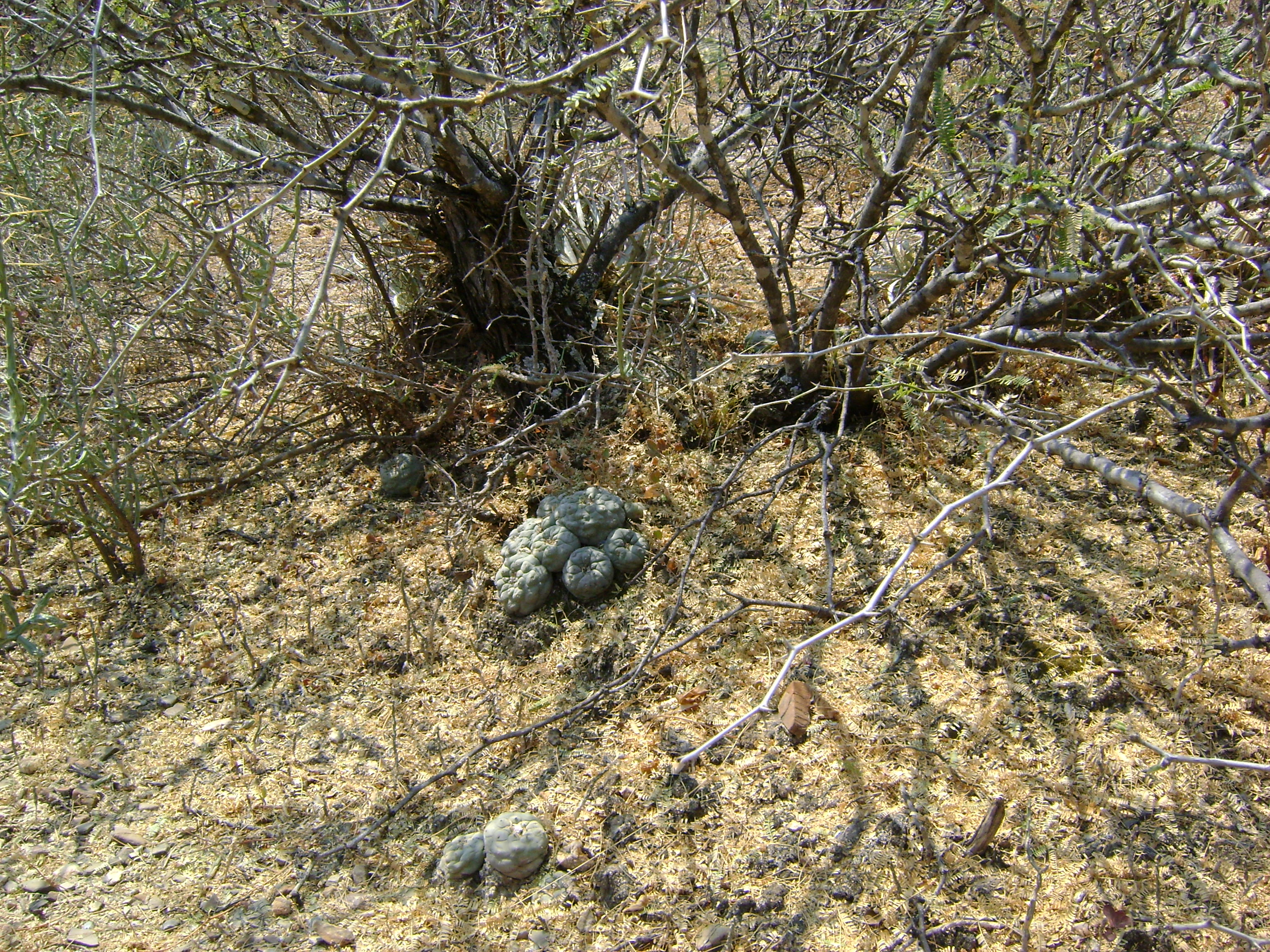
Plant growing under scrub in Pena Blanca, Queretaro

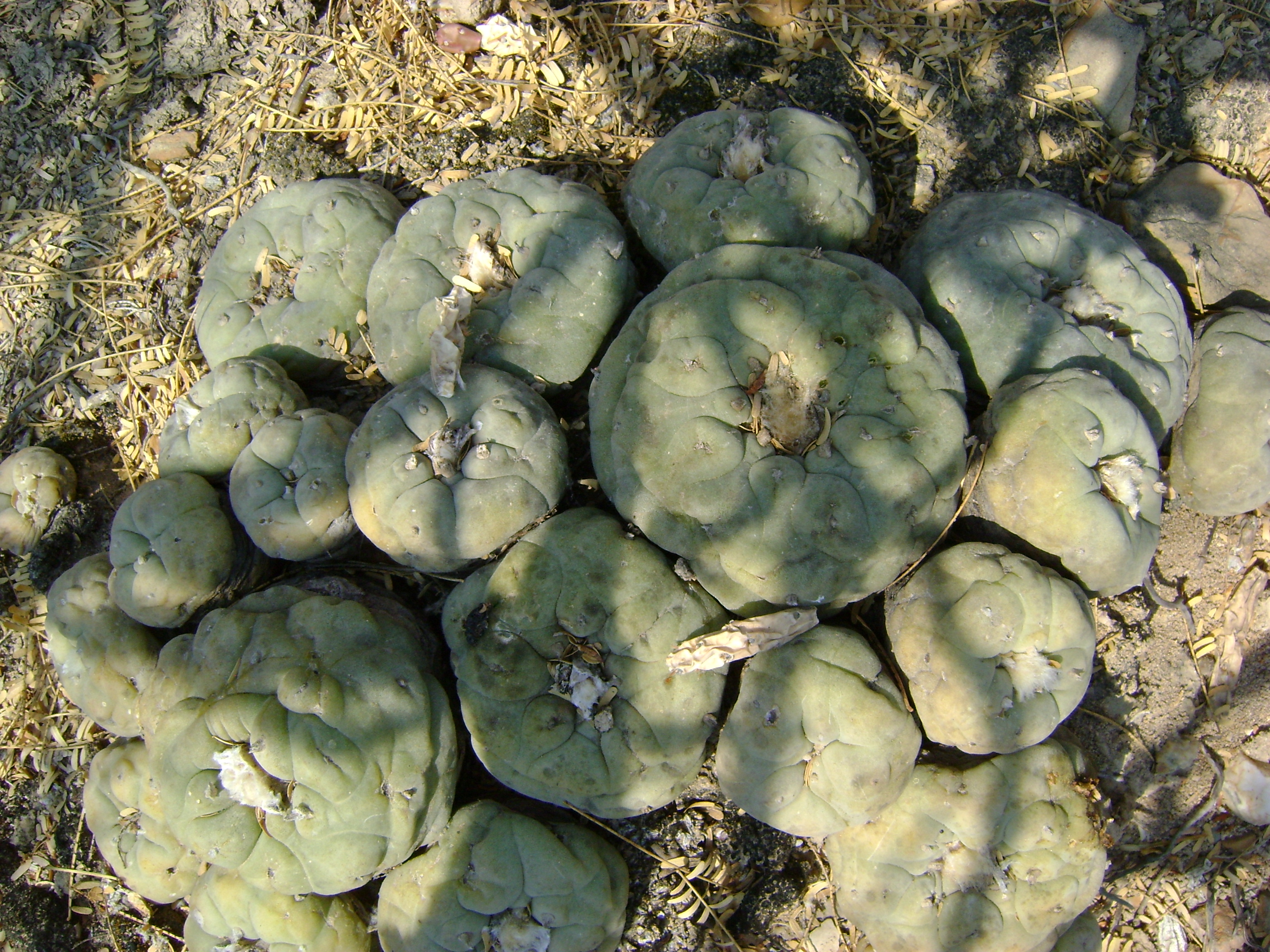
Cluster of plants growing in Pena Blanca, Queretaro

== Taxonomy ==
Originally described as Lophophora echinata var. diffusa by Léon Croizat in 1944, it was elevated to species level in 1967 by Helia Bravo Hollis. The epithet diffusa derives from Latin, meaning "indistinct," referencing the plant's low, flat, and barely noticeable warts.

== Constituents and effects ==
Lophophora diffusa contains 86% to more than 90% pellotine in terms of total alkaloid content and only trace amounts of mescaline (e.g., 1.2% of alkaloid content), whereas Lophophora williamsii (peyote) contains 30% mescaline and 17% pellotine with regard to total alkaloid content. Mescaline is a psychedelic drug, whereas pellotine is a sedative-hypnotic. However, pellotine was reported in one single study to additionally produce hallucinations at very high doses. Further study of Lophophora diffusa and pellotine is needed to confirm or refute the preceding findings.

Lophophora diffusa has reportedly been said to produce effects including feelings of clumsiness, confusion, and general discomfort, or by others a sense of mental clarity or tranquility. Unlike Lophophora williamsii, it is said to produce no or modest hallucinogenic effects. However, there have been several reports of Lophophora diffusa producing hallucinogenic effects, although this may be the result of misidentification as Lophophora williamsii. One study also reported Lophophora williamsii producing marked sleepiness with no hallucinogenic effects, potentially resulting from misidentification as well.

== See also ==
- Lophophora
