= Madeleine Bonnafoux Alcaraz =

Mexican politician from the PAN party

Deputy of the Congress of the Union
- In office August 29, 2018 – August 31, 2021

Personal details
- Born: 31 January 1979 (age 47)
- Party: PAN
- Education: Universidad de Sonora
- Occupation: Politician

Madeleine Bonnafoux Alcaraz (born January 31, 1979) is a Mexican politician from Sonora. A member of the National Action Party (PAN), she was a member of the Chamber of Deputies from August 29, 2018 to August 31, 2021. She was elected via proportional representation and served in the LXIV Legislature.

== Early life and education ==
Bonnafoux Alcaraz was born on January 31, 1979. She received her law license from the Universidad de Sonora.

== Political career ==
She was an alternate councilor in Hermosillo, Sonora, from 2003 to 2006. From 2009 to 2012, she was an alternate local deputy in the Congress of Sonora. Bonnafoux Alcaraz served from 2015 to 2018 as a member of the national permanent commission on PAN's National Executive Committee.

=== Chamber of Deputies ===
Bonnafoux Alcaraz was elected to the Chamber of Deputies in the 2018 election. In 2019, she stated that she opposes the legalization of abortion in Mexico and affirmed that PAN is a pro-life party. She argued that:

"It is not a moral or religious issue, science says it clearly: when a female cell and a male cell join together, it is already a new being, it has its own DNA, it generates its own organs..."

Noting the issue of femicide in Mexico, Bonnafoux Alcaraz said that "We have too many homicides in the country, too many femicides to also become an infanticidal country". She stated that PAN's opposition to abortion is consistent with its status as a "humanist party". She is a supporter of the National Front for the Family, a socially conservative organization.

In 2020, she proposed an amendment to guarantee the right to education during a strike.
