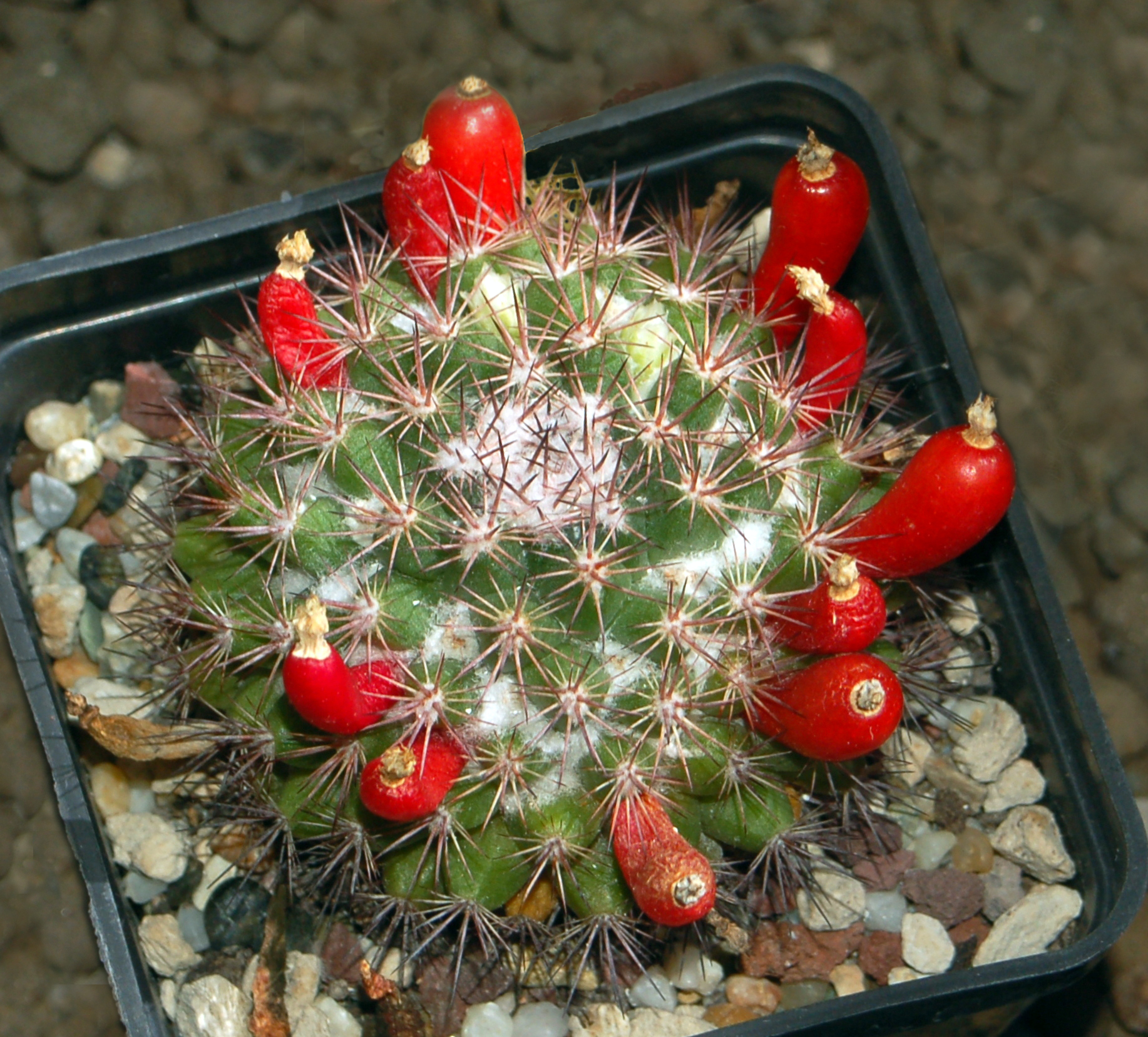
- Mammillaria mammillaris with red club-shaped fruits at the Orto Botanico dell'Università di Genova

Conservation status
- Least Concern (IUCN 3.1)

Scientific classification
- Kingdom: Plantae
- Clade: Tracheophytes
- Clade: Angiosperms
- Clade: Eudicots
- Order: Caryophyllales
- Family: Cactaceae
- Subfamily: Cactoideae
- Genus: Mammillaria
- Species: M. mammillaris

Binomial name
- Mammillaria mammillaris (L.) H. Karst.

Synonyms
- Cactus mammillaris L.; Neomammillaria mammillaris (L.) Britton & Rose

= Mammillaria mammillaris =

Species of cactus

Mammillaria mammilllaris, common name woolly nipple cactus, is a species of plant in the family Cactaceae. It is the type species of the genus Mammillaria. It has been described by Carolus Linnaeus as Cactus mammillaris in 1753. The specific epithet mammillaris comes from the Latin mammilla, meaning nipple, with reference to the characteristic tubercles.

== Description ==
Mammillaria mammillaris is a perennial plant that grows solitary or forming small groups. The stems are spherical to short cylindrical, light green to dark green and reach a diameter of up to 20 centimeters. The conical tubercules contain latex. The 3-5 reddish brown central spines have a darker tip and are 7-8 millimeters long. The top pin is the longest. The 10 to 16 radial spines are reddish brown and greyish in old age. Axils have scant wool. The flowers are cream-white, funnel-shaped and have a length of 1 to 1.2 centimeters. The club-shaped red fruits are 10 to 20 millimeters long and contain little brown, rough seeds.

== Distribution ==
This species is distributed in the Lesser Antilles to Trinidad and Tobago, Curaçao and the neighboring islands of the Netherlands Antilles and in Venezuela.

== Habitat ==
Its natural habitat are the coastal and mountainous regions, at an elevation of 0–500 metres (0–1,640 ft) above sea level.
