= Vizarrón =

Coordinates: 20°39′15″N 100°04′28″W

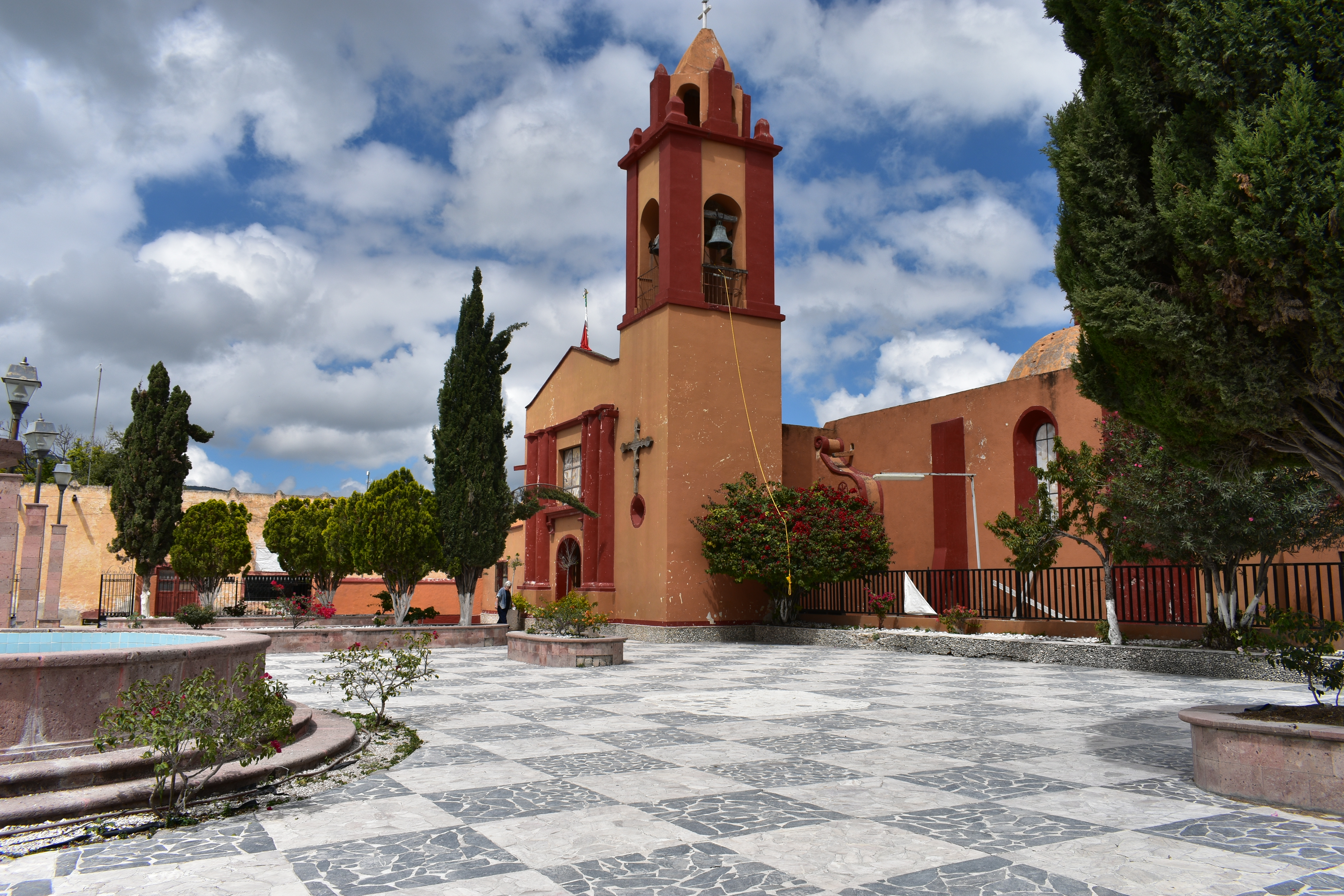
- Saint Joseph Parish in Vizarrón
- Interactive map of Vizarrón
- Country: Mexico
- State: Querétaro
- Municipality: Cadereyta de Montes
- Founded: 1647

Population
  - Total: 3,965
- Time zone: UTC-6 (CST)

Vizarrón is a village in the Mexican state of Querétaro. It is located in the municipality of Cadereyta de Montes. It has 1,666 inhabitants, and is located at 2,100 meters above sea level.
