= Tolimán, Querétaro =

Tolimán, Querétaro, Mexico
Coat of Arms
Coordinates	20.908°N 99.930°W
Municipal president	Magdaleno Muñoz González (PRI)
Area	724.7 km²
Population (2020)	6,290
HDI (2000)	0.7096
Time zone (UTC)	-6 UTC Central
GDP (per capita) (2000)	US$3.448,00
Official website: http://www.toliman.gob.mx

Tolimán (Querétaro Otomi: Ntolimä) is the seat of the municipality of the same name in the Mexican state of Querétaro. Its name comes from the Nahuatl word tolimani, meaning place where the tule tree is picked up.

== See also ==
- Gudiños
