= Tolimán Municipality, Querétaro =

Tolimán
- Municipality
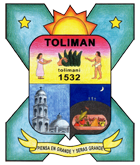
- Coat of arms

- Location within Querétaro Location within Mexico
- Coordinates: 20°55′N 99°56′W
- Country: Mexico
- State: Querétaro
- Municipal seat: Tolimán, Querétaro
- Time zone: UTC-6 (Central)
- Website: https://toliman.gob.mx/

Tolimán (Querétaro Otomi: Ntolimä) is a municipality in the central Mexican state of Querétaro. The municipal seat is at Tolimán.
