= Cadereyta de Montes =

City in Querétaro, Mexico

Cadereyta
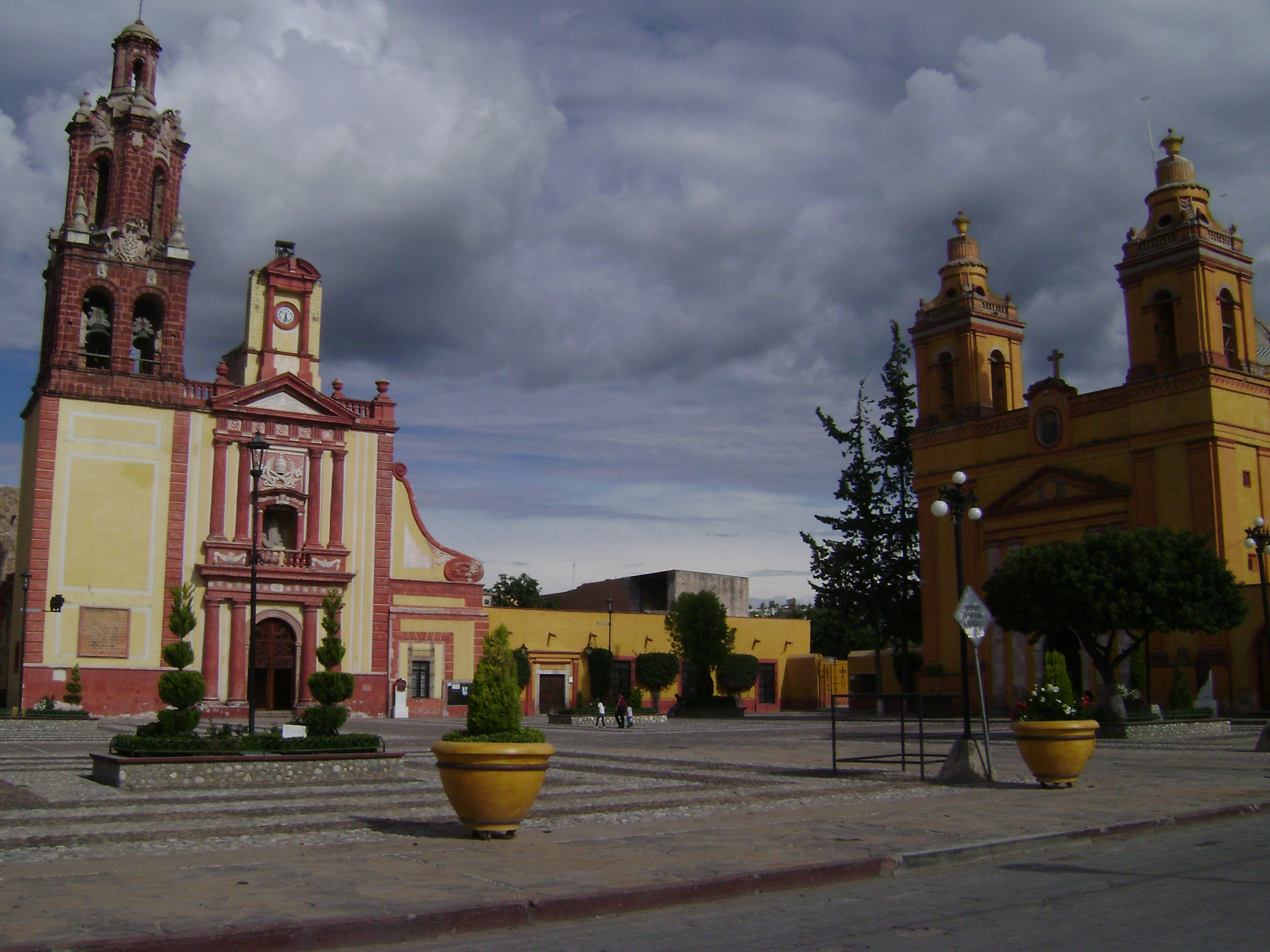
- Cadereyta Downtown

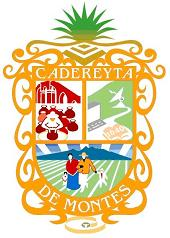
- Seal
- Nickname: Cade
- Interactive map of Cadereyta
- Country: Mexico
- State: Querétaro
- Municipality: Cadereyta de Montes
- Founded: 1647
- Named for: Lope Díez de Armendáriz, 1st Marquess of Cadreita and Ezequiel Montes

Government
  - Mayor: Astrid Ortega Vázquez

Population (2020)
  - Total: 15,512
- Time zone: UTC-6 (CST)
- Website: https://cadereytademontes.gob.mx/2024/index.php

Cadereyta de Montes (Spanish: [kaðeˈɾejta ðe ˈmontes]) is a city and municipality in the Mexican state of Querétaro. The municipality is the second most extensive in the state.

The city was founded in 1640, and received its current name in two stages: first in 1642 in honor of Viceroy Don Lope Díez de Armendáriz, 1st Marquess of Cadreita, and then in 1904 after the lawyer Ezequiel Montes. From its conception during the Spanish rule of Mexico, the city was intended to become quite important. It received the status of Alcaldía mayor in 1689, thus becoming the dominant city in this part of the state. It was a post from which the main trade routes were defended from attacks by the indigenous people of the Sierra Gorda.

A famous greenhouse called Finca Schmoll is in the city, preserving a large collection of desert plants open to the public.

== History ==
Approximately 7,000 years ago, the Cadereyta region was inhabited by various nomad groups who hunted and collected food to sustain themselves. Wooden tools used by hunter-gatherers, including an atlatl, el Atlatl Violeta, were found by the AEQ - Asociación de Espeleólogos de Querétaro, Querétaro Grotto, in the Cueva del Tesoro and radiocarbon dated to between 7 and 132 CE.

Some of these indigenous groups were the Chichimecas, Pame, and Jonace. These groups were some of the primary inhabitants until the arrival of the Spaniards, the indigenous groups continuously pushed back and fought against the Spanish. From this conflict arose a wave of peace campaigns, which were undertaken by religious missionaries who came from Tecozautla and Huichapan, and the military. In 1639, Viceroy Lope Díez de Armendáriz, 1st Marquess of Cadreita fully supported the peace campaigns, which were being led by Captain Alonso of Tovar Guzman. The captain later named the city of Cadereyta in memory of the Marquess of Cadereyta. Around 1640 the Spaniards established the Villa de Cadereyta.

== Climate ==
Climate data for Cadereyta de Montes, Querétaro (1981-2010), extremes (1973–present)
Month	Jan	Feb	Mar	Apr	May	Jun	Jul	Aug	Sep	Oct	Nov	Dec	Year
Record high °C (°F)	30.0 (86.0)	33.0 (91.4)	40.0 (104.0)	40.0 (104.0)	38.0 (100.4)	37.0 (98.6)	35.0 (95.0)	33.0 (91.4)	33.0 (91.4)	36.0 (96.8)	32.0 (89.6)	31.0 (87.8)	40.0 (104.0)
Mean daily maximum °C (°F)	22.7 (72.9)	24.5 (76.1)	27.4 (81.3)	29.7 (85.5)	29.3 (84.7)	27.3 (81.1)	25.2 (77.4)	25.7 (78.3)	24.7 (76.5)	24.3 (75.7)	24.5 (76.1)	23.0 (73.4)	25.7 (78.3)
Daily mean °C (°F)	13.4 (56.1)	15.0 (59.0)	17.6 (63.7)	19.9 (67.8)	20.2 (68.4)	19.6 (67.3)	18.3 (64.9)	18.6 (65.5)	18.0 (64.4)	16.9 (62.4)	15.6 (60.1)	14.0 (57.2)	17.3 (63.1)
Mean daily minimum °C (°F)	4.1 (39.4)	5.4 (41.7)	7.9 (46.2)	10.2 (50.4)	11.1 (52.0)	12.0 (53.6)	11.5 (52.7)	11.4 (52.5)	11.3 (52.3)	9.4 (48.9)	6.7 (44.1)	5.0 (41.0)	8.8 (47.8)
Record low °C (°F)	−9.0 (15.8)	−6.0 (21.2)	−2.0 (28.4)	2.0 (35.6)	4.0 (39.2)	6.0 (42.8)	1.0 (33.8)	0.5 (32.9)	4.0 (39.2)	−4.0 (24.8)	−5.0 (23.0)	−8.0 (17.6)	−9.0 (15.8)
Average precipitation mm (inches)	10.0 (0.39)	6.0 (0.24)	11.8 (0.46)	25.1 (0.99)	39.4 (1.55)	70.8 (2.79)	94.2 (3.71)	80.6 (3.17)	72.1 (2.84)	41.5 (1.63)	11.9 (0.47)	2.1 (0.08)	465.5 (18.33)
Average precipitation days (≥ 0.1 mm)	1.6	1.3	1.6	2.7	5.1	7.1	7.9	7.2	8.1	4.4	1.5	0.8	49.3
Source: Servicio Meteorológico Nacional (temperature, 1981-2010)
