= Bernal =

Bernal is a Spanish given name and surname, equivalent to the English name Bernard.

Bernal may refer to:

== People with the name ==
=== Given name ===
- Bernal de Bonaval, 13th century Galician troubadour
- Bernal de Foix, 1st Count of Medinaceli, Spanish military officer
- Bernal Díaz del Castillo (c. 1492 – 1581), Spanish conquistador

=== Middle name ===
- Ralph Bernal Osborne (1808–1882), British Liberal politician

=== Surname ===
==== A ====
- Agostino Bernal (1587–1642), Spanish Jesuit theologian
- Agustín Bernal (1959–2018), Mexican film actor
- Alcides Bernal (1965–2026), Brazilian lawyer, radio broadcaster and politician
- Alejandro Bernal (footballer, born 1988) (born 1988), Colombian football player
- Andy Bernal (born 1966), Australian football player
- Anthony Bernal, American political aide

==== C ====
- Cassie Bernall (1981–1999), student killed in the Columbine High School massacre
- César Bernal (born 1995), Mexican footballer
- Chesús Bernal (1960–2019), Spanish professor and politician

==== D ====
- Darío Yazbek Bernal (1990), Mexican actor
- David "Elsewhere" Bernal (1979), American popping dancer
- Delfina Bernal (born 1941), Colombian painter and multimedia artist
- Diana Bernal, Mexican politician

==== E ====
- Egan Bernal (born 1997), Colombian road cyclist

==== F ====
- Floralia Estrada Bernal (born 1990), Mexican para-athlete

==== G ====
- Gabriel Bernal (1956–2014), Mexican boxer
- Gael García Bernal (born 1978), Mexican film actor

==== H ====
- Heraclio Bernal (1855–1888), Mexican bandit

==== I ====
- Ignacio Bernal (1910–1992), Mexican anthropologist and archaeologist
- Ishmael Bernal (1938–1996), Filipino filmmaker

==== J ====
- Jair Bernal (born 1968), Colombian road cyclist
- Jesús Aparicio-Bernal (1929–2024), Spanish politician
- Jesús Mosquera Bernal (born 1993), Spanish actor
- John Desmond Bernal (1901–1971), Irish-born biophysicist, crystallographer, historian of science, and British Communist
- Jorge Bernal (born 1979), Mexican football player
- José Bernal (1925–2010), Cuban-American artist
- José Daniel Bernal (born 1973), Colombian road cyclist
- José León Bernal (born 1995), Spanish football player
- Joseph Bernal (1927–2025), American politician in Texas
- Joyce E. Bernal (born 1968), Filipina director
- Juan Bernal Ponce (1938–2006), Costa Rican architect
- Julio Ernesto Bernal, Colombian road cyclist

==== K ====
- Kris Bernal (born 1989), Filipina actress

==== L ====
- Laura Bernal (195?–2020), Argentine diplomat
- Lorena Bernal (born 1981), Argentine-Spanish beauty queen and actress
- Lorenzo Bernal del Mercado (1530–1593), Spanish captain
- Luz Marina Bernal (born 1960), Colombian human rights activist

==== M ====
- Marcelino Bernal (born 1962), Mexican football player
- Marco Antonio Bernal (1953–2025), Mexican politician
- Mariana Bernal (born 2003), Mexican archer
- Martin Bernal (1937–2013), British scholar of modern Chinese political history
- Miguel Bernal Jiménez (1910–1956), Mexican composer, organist, pedagogist and musicologist

==== P ====
- Paulino Bernal (1939–2022), American accordion player

==== R ====
- Rafael Bernal (1915-1972), Mexican diplomat and writer
- Ralph Bernal (1783 or 1784–1854), British Whig politician
- Rodrigo Bernal (born 1959), Colombian botanist
- Rogelio Bernal Andreo (born 1969), Spanish-American astrophotographer

==== S ====
- Salvador Bernal (footballer) (born 1992), Mexican football player
- Salvador Bernal (artist) (1945–2011), Filipino artist
- Sergio Bernal (born 1970), Mexican football player
- Susan Bernal (born 1982), Colombian materials scientist

==== V ====
- Victor Bernal (baseball) (1953–2006), Major League Baseball pitcher
- Victor Bernal (politician)

== Geography ==
- Peña de Bernal, monolith in Mexico
  - Bernal, Querétaro, Mexico (San Sebastián Bernal), site of the Peña de Bernal
- Bernal, Argentina, a city
- Bernal, New Mexico, United States
- Bernal, a location in Serafina, New Mexico, United States
- Bernal Heights, neighborhood of San Francisco, United States
  - Bernal Heights Summit, a nearby hill
- Bernal District, Peru
- Bernal Islands, sub-group of the Biscoe Islands, Antarctica
- Bernal/Singleton Transfer Location, bus station in Dallas, Texas. United States
- Bernal Subbasin, an aquifer in California, United States
- Augustin Bernal Park, a park in Pleasanton, California, United States

== Other ==
- Bernal Lecture (endowed by John Desmond Bernal), organised by the Royal Society of London
- Bernal sphere (named after John Desmond Bernal), a type of space habitat
- Bernal v. Fainter, 1984 US Supreme Court case

== See also ==
- Bernalillo
