= Victor Bernal =

Victor Bernal may refer to:

- Victor Bernal (baseball)
- Victor Bernal (politician)
