= María Esther Scherman Leaño =

Mexican politician (born 1957)

María Scherman Leaño
- Born: 5 January 1957 (age 69); Guadalajara, Jalisco, Mexico
- Occupation: Politician
- Political party: PRI
- Spouse: Marco Antonio Bernal Gutiérrez

María Esther de Jesús Scherman Leaño (born 5 January 1957) is a Mexican politician affiliated with the Institutional Revolutionary Party (PRI).

Scherman Leaño was born in Guadalajara, Jalisco, in 1957. She has been elected to the Chamber of Deputies on five occasions:

- In the 1985 mid-terms (53rd Congress), for Jalisco's 3rd district
- In the 1991 mid-terms (55th Congress), for Jalisco's 16th district
- In the 2003 mid-terms (59th Congress), as a plurinominal deputy for the first region
- In the 2009 mid-terms (61st Congress), as a plurinominal deputy for the first region
- In the 2015 mid-terms (63rd Congress), as a plurinominal deputy for the fourth region

In the 1988 general election, she was elected to the Senate for the 54th Congress.

Scherman Leaño was also the director of the National Lottery during the presidency of Enrique Peña Nieto (2012–2018).
