= Rogelio Bernal Andreo =

Spanish-American astrophotographer

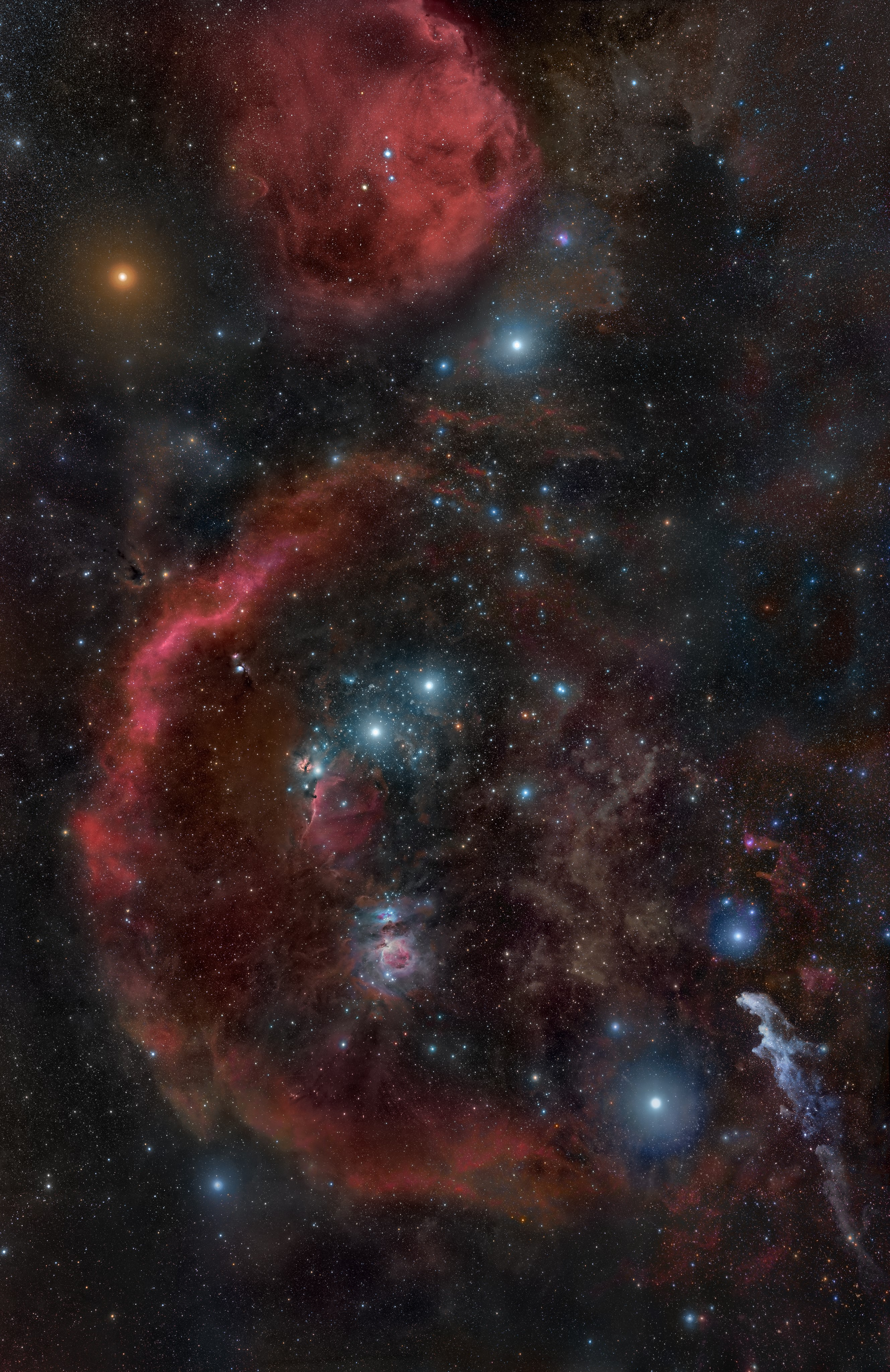
- Andreo's photograph of the constellation Orion
- Born: 9 January 1969 (age 57); Murcia, Spain
- Education: Harvard University; Wentworth Institute of Technology, (BSc 1995)
- Known for: Astrophotography
- Spouse: Ariana Fu (m. 1998; died 2021)
- Website: deepskycolors.com

Rogelio Bernal Andreo (born 9 January 1969) is a Spanish-American astrophotographer. He is known for his photographs of deep sky objects. His work has been recognized by NASA as a regular contributor to their Astronomy Picture of the Day (APOD) 80 times. Andreo's photography has been published in international magazines and periodicals, as well as television networks including the BBC, National Geographic, and the Discovery Channel series Into the Universe with Stephen Hawking.

== Personal background ==
Rogelio Bernal Andreo was born on 9 January 1969, in Murcia, Spain. When he was 20 years old, he moved to Boston, Massachusetts. In 1995, he earned a bachelor's degree in computer science from Harvard University and the Wentworth Institute of Technology. He has two children.

== Professional background ==
After earning his bachelor's degree, Andreo moved to the San Francisco Bay Area, where he worked for Netscape Communications and eBay as lead software engineer. In 2008, he started exploring astrophotography as a hobby and developed a personal style defined by deep wide field images that has led to international recognition and a meaningful influence on the discipline. His work has included using post-processing techniques not very common at the time of their introduction, and he has written of his use of multi-scale processing techniques.

Andreo's work has appeared on NASA's Astronomy Picture of the Day, in addition to publications such as Astronomy Magazine, Ciel et Espace, Sky and Telescope, National Geographic, as well as television networks such as the BBC, National Geographic, and the Discovery Channel series Into the Universe with Stephen Hawking. Two of his Orion wide field images were used in the Orion's flyby scene for the Hubble 3D motion picture. Rogelio's work was also used in the Cosmos: A Spacetime Odyssey series.

His image, Orion, from Head to Toes was selected by Discover Magazine's Bad Astronomy, as the best astronomy picture of 2010. It was the first time this award was given to an amateur astronomer.

== Honors and awards ==
- 2009: Astronomy Magazine – Deep Sky category in the astroimaging contest (Winner)
- 2010: Advanced Imaging Conference Board of Directors – (Pleiades Award Winner)
- 2010: Discover Magazine's Bad Astronomy – The Top Astronomy Picture of 2010 (Winner)
- 2010: Royal Observatory Greenwich – Astronomy Photographer of the Year, Deep Space category (Winner)
- 2011: Royal Observatory Greenwich – Astronomy Photographer of the Year, Deep Space category (Highly Commended)
- 2011: Astronomical Association of Northern California – Outstanding contribution to Amateur Astronomy (Winner)
- 2011: SBIG's Hall of Fame – For excellence in astronomical imaging (Winner)
- 2012: Royal Observatory Greenwich – Astronomy Photographer of the Year, Deep Space category (Runner-up)
- 2013: Royal Observatory Greenwich – Astronomy Photographer of the Year, Deep Space category (Shortlisted)
- 2014: Royal Observatory Greenwich – Astronomy Photographer of the Year, Deep Space category (Highly Commended)

== Selected works ==
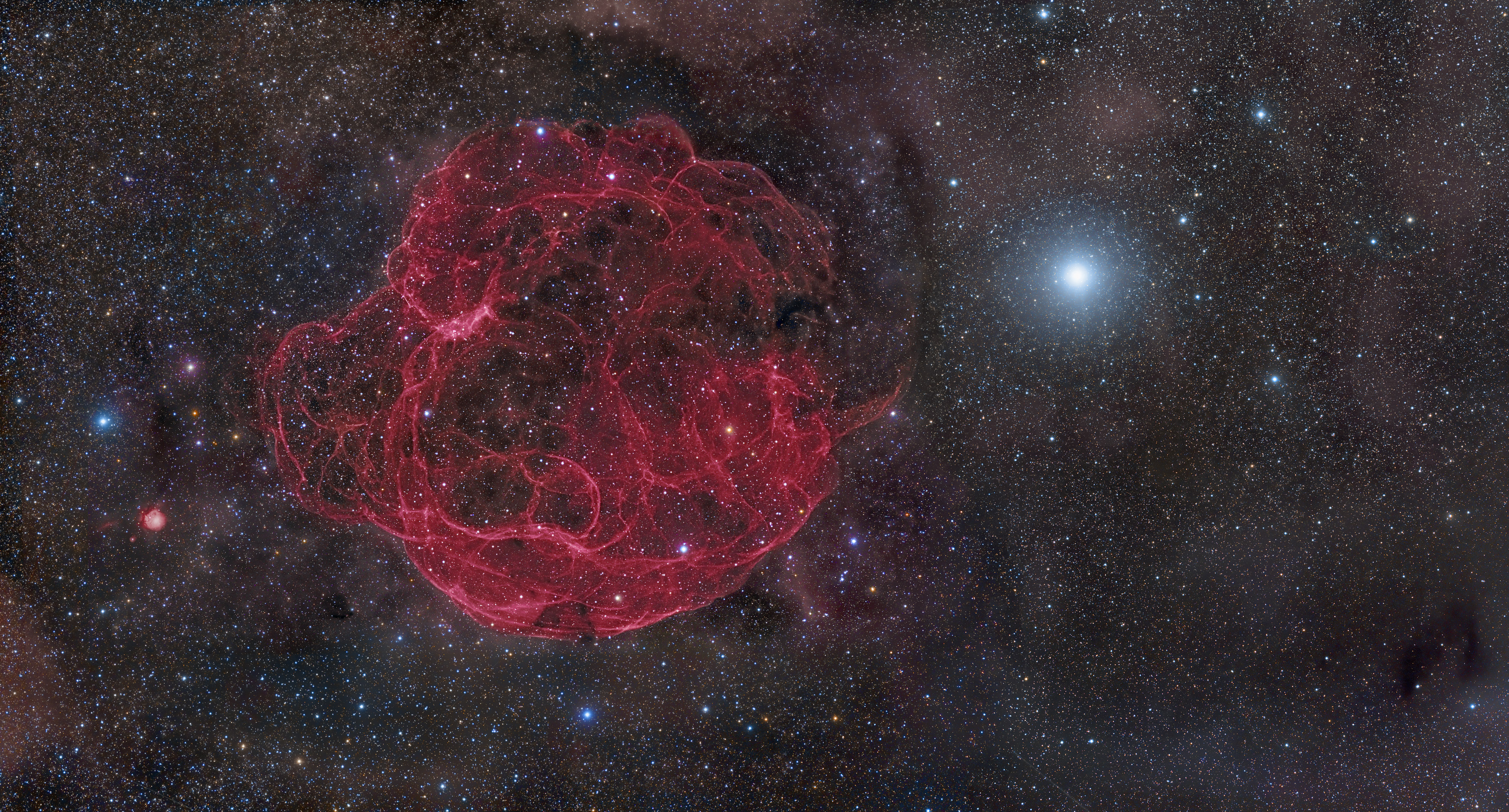
The Spaghetti Nebula in the constellation Taurus

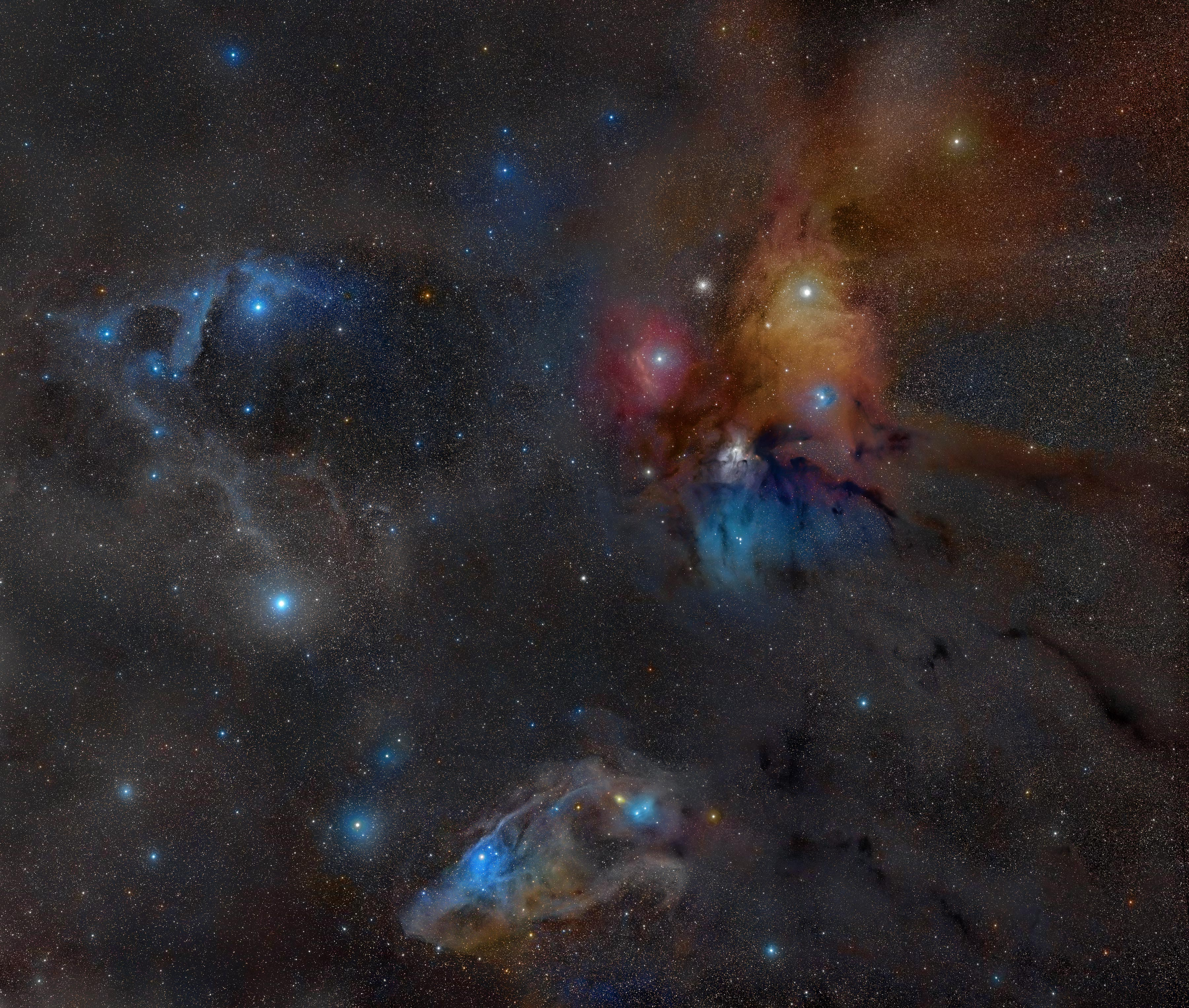
Rho Ophiuchi molecular cloud complex in Ophiuchus
