= Canon EOS 6D =

2012 Full-frame digital single-lens reflex camera

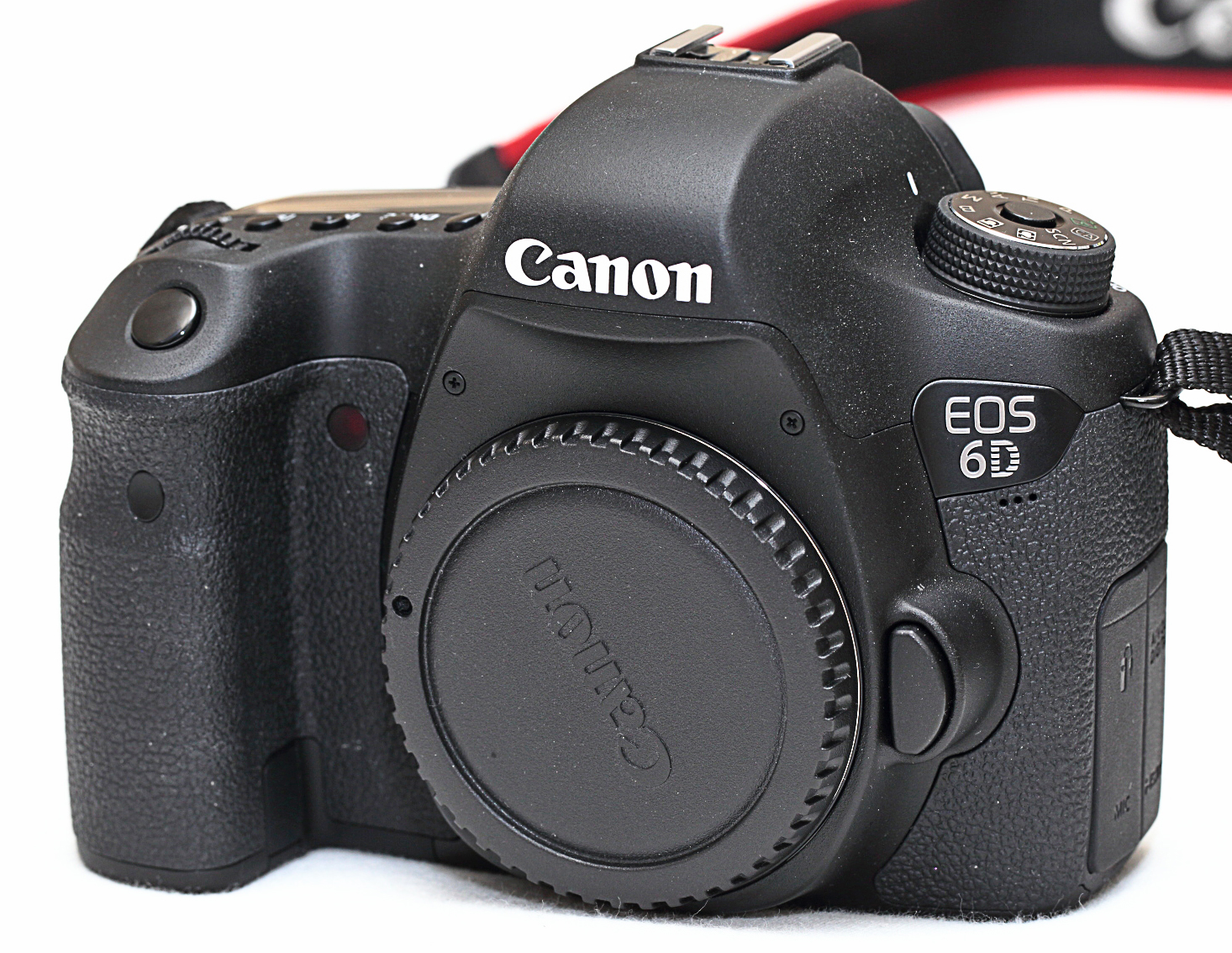
- The EOS 6D body without a lens attached

Overview
- Maker: Canon Inc.
- Type: Digital single-lens reflex camera
- Intro price: US$1899

Lens
- Lens mount: Canon EF
- Lens: Interchangeable (EF)

Sensor/medium
- Sensor: 35.8 mm × 23.9 mm CMOS
- Maximum resolution: 5,472 × 3,648 (20 effective megapixels)
- Film speed: 100 – 25,600 (expansion to L1 50 / H1 51.200 / H2 102,400)
- Storage media: SD, SDHC or SDXC card (UHS-I capable)

Focusing
- Focus modes: One-shot, AI Servo, AI Focus, Manual
- Focus areas: 11 autofocus points

Exposure/metering
- Exposure modes: Full auto, programmed, shutter priority, aperture priority, manual
- Exposure metering: TTL, full aperture, 63 zones
- Metering modes: Evaluative, Partial, Spot, Center-weighted average

Shutter
- Shutter: Electronic focal-plane
- Shutter speed range: 30 s to 1/4,000 s, bulb, 1/180 s X-sync
- Continuous shooting: up to 4.5 fps

Viewfinder
- Viewfinder: Optical pentaprism with 97% coverage 0.71× and electronic (Live View)
- Image processor: DIGIC 5+

General
- LCD screen: 3.0 in (7.6 cm), 720 × 480 pixels, 288 ppi (approx. 1,040,000 dots)
- Battery: Li-Ion LP-E6 Rechargeable (1800 mAh)
- Optional battery packs: BG-E13 grip allows use of 6 AA cells, a single LP-E6 or two LP-E6 batteries
- Dimensions: 144.5 mm × 110.5 mm × 71.2 mm (5.69 in × 4.35 in × 2.80 in)
- Weight: 680 g (24 oz), body only; 755 g (26.6 oz), CIPA standard
- Made in: Japan

Chronology
- Successor: Canon EOS 6D Mark II

The Canon EOS 6D is a 20.2-megapixel full-frame CMOS digital single-lens reflex camera made by Canon.

The EOS 6D was publicly announced on 17 September 2012, one day before the start of the Photokina 2012 trade show. It was released in late November 2012 and offered at that time as a body only for a suggested retail price of US$2,099 or in a package with an EF 24-105mm f/4L IS USM zoom lens for a suggested retail price of US$2,899.

It was superseded by the EOS 6D Mark II in 2017.

== Features ==
There are 2 versions of EOS 6D. EOS 6D (N) and EOS 6D (WG):

The EOS 6D (WG) is the first Canon DSLR to feature GPS functions and built in Wi-Fi capabilities, which geotag images and allow files to be uploaded directly to Facebook, YouTube, or Canon Image Gateway; transferred to external devices; or sent to be printed on a Wi-Fi-enabled Canon printer. The Wi-Fi capabilities also allow remote control and viewing via many smartphones. These features are not available in the (N) version of the camera.

Weighing 770 grams (27 oz), the 6D is also Canon's smallest and lightest full-frame DSLR, comparable to the APS-C sensor 60D. The camera supports ISO settings from 50 to 102,400 which can be selected automatically or adjusted manually, an 11-point autofocus system, and an anti-glare 3.0 inches (76 mm) LCD screen. The center autofocus point has a sensitivity of −3 EV.

The BG-E13 battery grip, which was made to be used with the 6D, allows the use of six AA cells, or one or two LP-E6 batteries. The 6D has a maximum burst frame rate of 4.5 frames per second. Like all Canon DSLR full-frame cameras, the 6D does not have a built in flash due to the design of the viewfinder.

=== Image features ===
- 20.2 megapixel full-frame CMOS sensor.
- DIGIC 5+ image processor.
- Fluorine-coated low-pass filter.

=== Autofocus and metering ===
- 11-point autofocus sensors with 1 cross-type sensor in center (x-type is sensitive down to −3 EV).
- TTL-CT-SIR AF with CMOS sensor.
- 63-zone dual-layer silicon cell.
- AF micro adjust (±20 steps).

=== ISO ===
- ISO 100 – ISO 25,600. Expansion down to ISO 50 and up to ISO 51,200 and ISO 102,400.

=== Shutter ===
- 30 s – 1/4,000 s (and bulb) is the shutter speed range.
- 4.5 fps burst rate.

=== Ergonomics and functions ===
- Optical pentaprism viewfinder with approximately 97% coverage (0,71× enlargement)
- Clear View TFT LCD screen (3 "/77 mm) with 720 × 480 pixels, 288 ppi (approximately 1,040,000 dots), resolution with dual anti-glare coating.
- Wi-Fi functionality.
- Metal alloy housing. (The top is made out of high-grade plastic.)
- Built-in GPS. This remains on when the camera is switched off, and quickly drains the battery if not deactivated via setting.

=== Video ===
The movie image size can be set, as well as the frame rate and compression method. Available modes:

- 1920×1080 @ 24/25/30 fps: Full High Definition recording quality
- 1280×720 @ 50/60 fps: High-Definition recording quality
- 640×480 @ 50/60 fps: Standard-definition recording quality

== Firmware updates ==
Release date	Firmware	Fixes
2016-09-29	1.1.7	Its main improvement was support for the EF 70–300mm f/4–5.6 IS II USM lens.
2017-11-29	1.1.8	Fixes a phenomenon in which standard exposure may not be obtained, or an irregular exposure may result, when Silent LV (Live View) shooting with the following TS-E lenses: TS-E 50mm f/2.8L MACRO, TS-E 90mm f/2.8L MACRO, or TS-E 135mm f/4L MACRO.
2019-11-21	1.1.9	Firmware Version 1.1.9 incorporates the following fixes: 1. Corrects a PTP communications vulnerability. 2. Corrects a vulnerability related to firmware update.

== Gallery ==
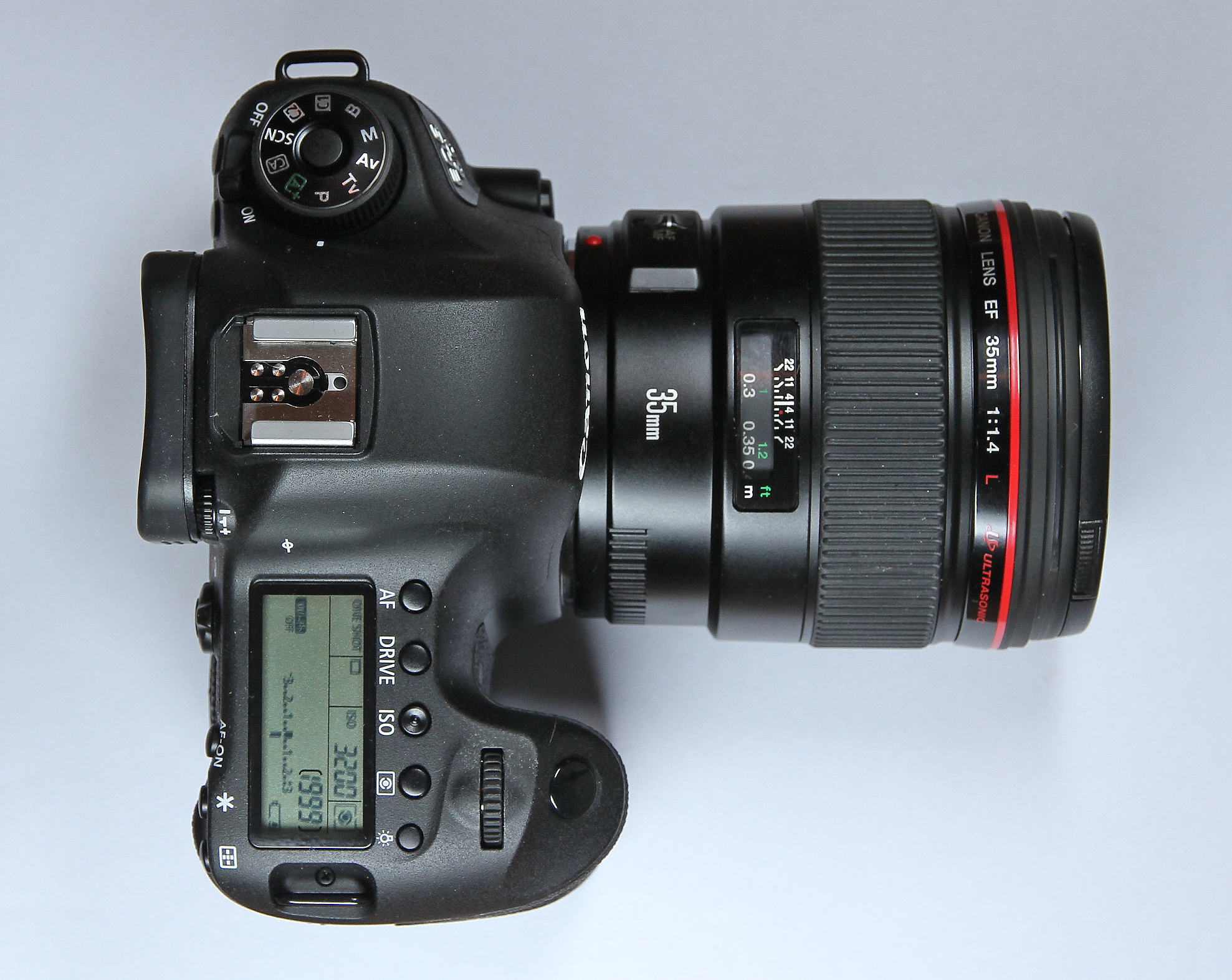
Top view of the 6D

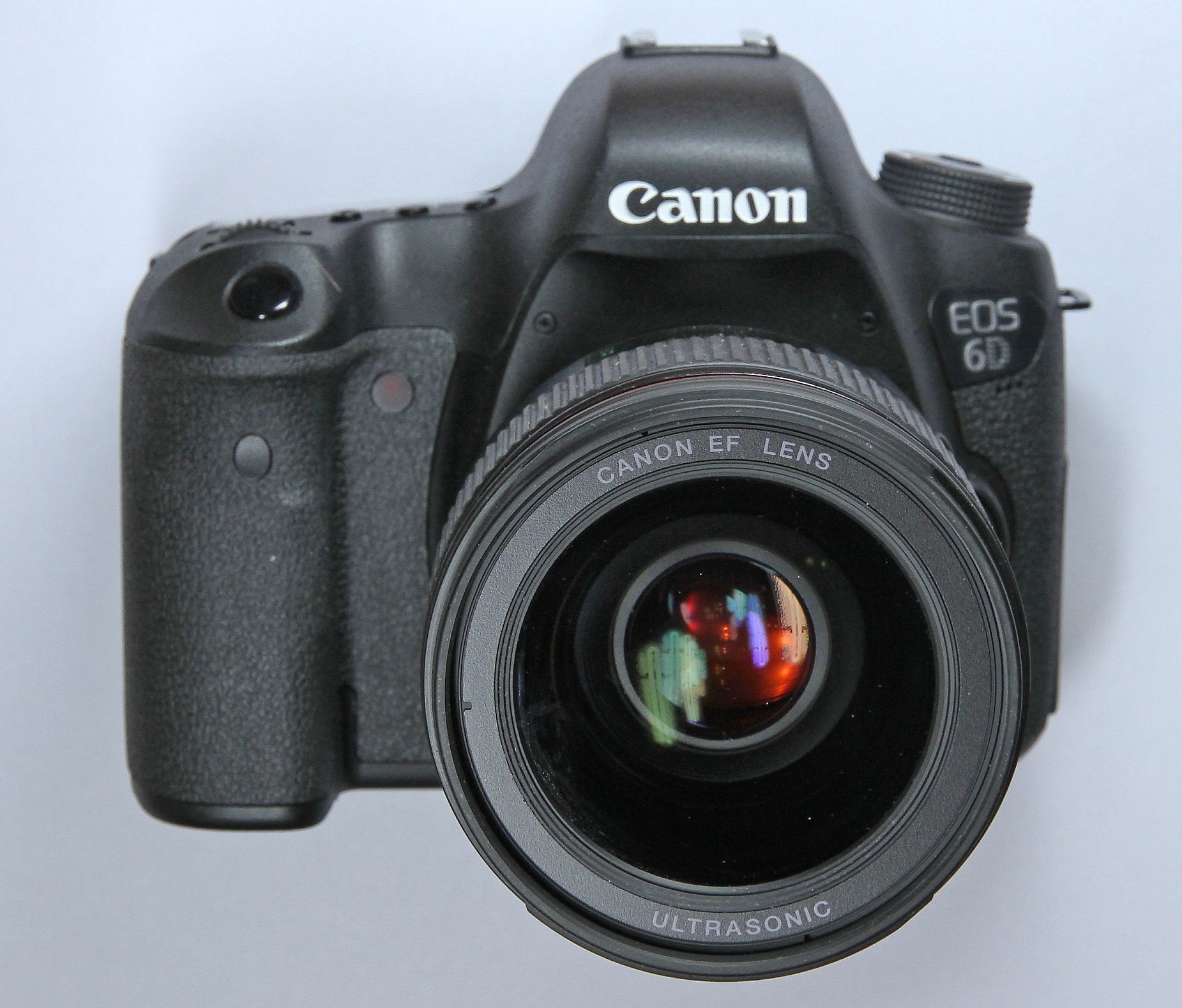
6D with an EF 35mm f/1.4L lens attached

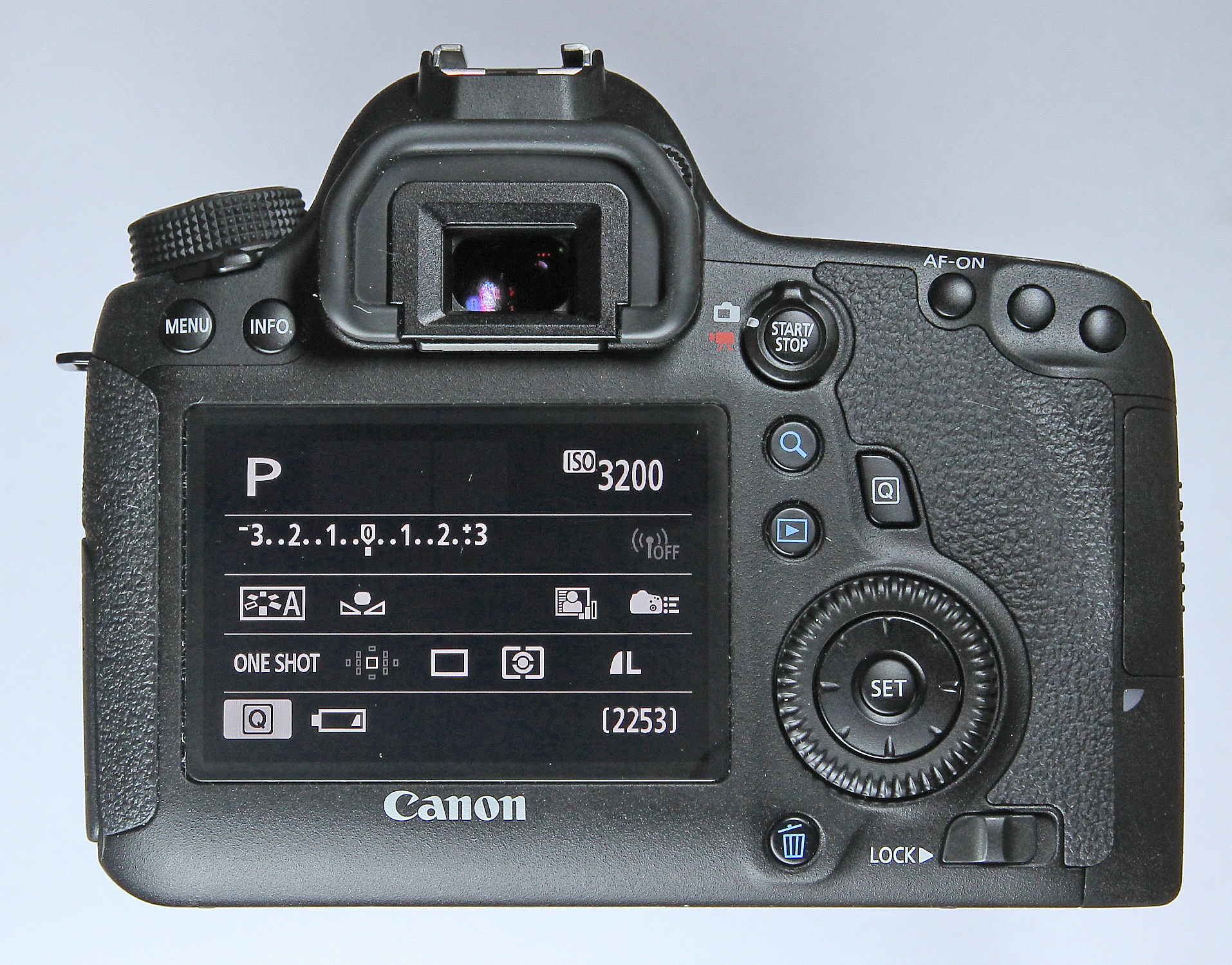
Back view of the 6D

== Reception ==
Digital Photography Review have chosen Canon EOS 6D as one of the 20 most important cameras of the 2010s.

According to Skies & Scopes, the Canon EOS 6D was the most commonly used camera in images shortlisted in the RMG Astronomy Photographer of the Year competition from 2018 to 2021.

== See also ==
- Canon EOS 6D Mark II
- Canon EOS 5D Mark III
- Canon EOS 60D

Type	Sensor	Class	00	01	02	03	04	05	06	07	08	09	10	11	12	13	14	15	16	17	18	19	20	21	22	23	24	25	26
DSLR	Full-frame	Flagship				1Ds		1Ds Mk II			1Ds Mk III					1D C													
DSLR	Full-frame	Flagship				1Ds		1Ds Mk II			1Ds Mk III				1D X					1D X Mk II ^{T}			1D X Mk III ^{T}						
DSLR	APS-H	Flagship			1D			1D Mk II	1D Mk II N		1D Mk III		1D Mk IV																
DSLR	Full-frame	Professional																	5DS / 5DS R										
DSLR	Full-frame	Professional							5D			_{x} 5D Mk II			_{x} 5D Mk III					5D Mk IV ^{T}									
DSLR	Full-frame	Advanced														_{x} 6D					_{x} 6D Mk II ^{AT}								
DSLR	APS-C	Advanced											_{x} 7D					_{x} 7D Mk II											
DSLR	APS-C	Mid-range						20Da								_{x} 60Da ^{A}													
DSLR	APS-C	Mid-range		D30	D60	10D		20D	30D		40D	_{x} 50D		_{x} 60D ^{A}			_{x} 70D ^{AT}		80D ^{AT}				90D ^{AT}						
DSLR	APS-C	Mid-range																	760D ^{AT}		77D ^{AT}								
DSLR	APS-C	Entry-level					300D	350D		400D	450D	_{x} 500D	_{x} 550D	_{x} 600D ^{A}		_{x} 650D ^{AT}	_{x} 700D ^{AT}		_{x} 750D ^{AT}		800D ^{AT}			850D ^{AT}					
DSLR	APS-C	Entry-level															_{x} 100D ^{T}		_{x} 200D ^{AT}				250D ^{AT}						
DSLR	APS-C	Entry-level										1000D		_{x} 1100D			_{x} 1200D			1300D		2000D							
DSLR	APS-C	Value																				4000D							
Early models			Canon EOS DCS 5 (1995); Canon EOS DCS 3 (1995); Canon EOS DCS 1 (1995); Canon EOS D2000 (1998); Canon EOS D6000 (1998)																										
Type	Sensor	Spec																											
Type	Sensor	Spec	00	01	02	03	04	05	06	07	08	09	10	11	12	13	14	15	16	17	18	19	20	21	22	23	24	25	26
