= Cockrell Hill Transfer Location =

Bus station in Cockrell Hill, Texas

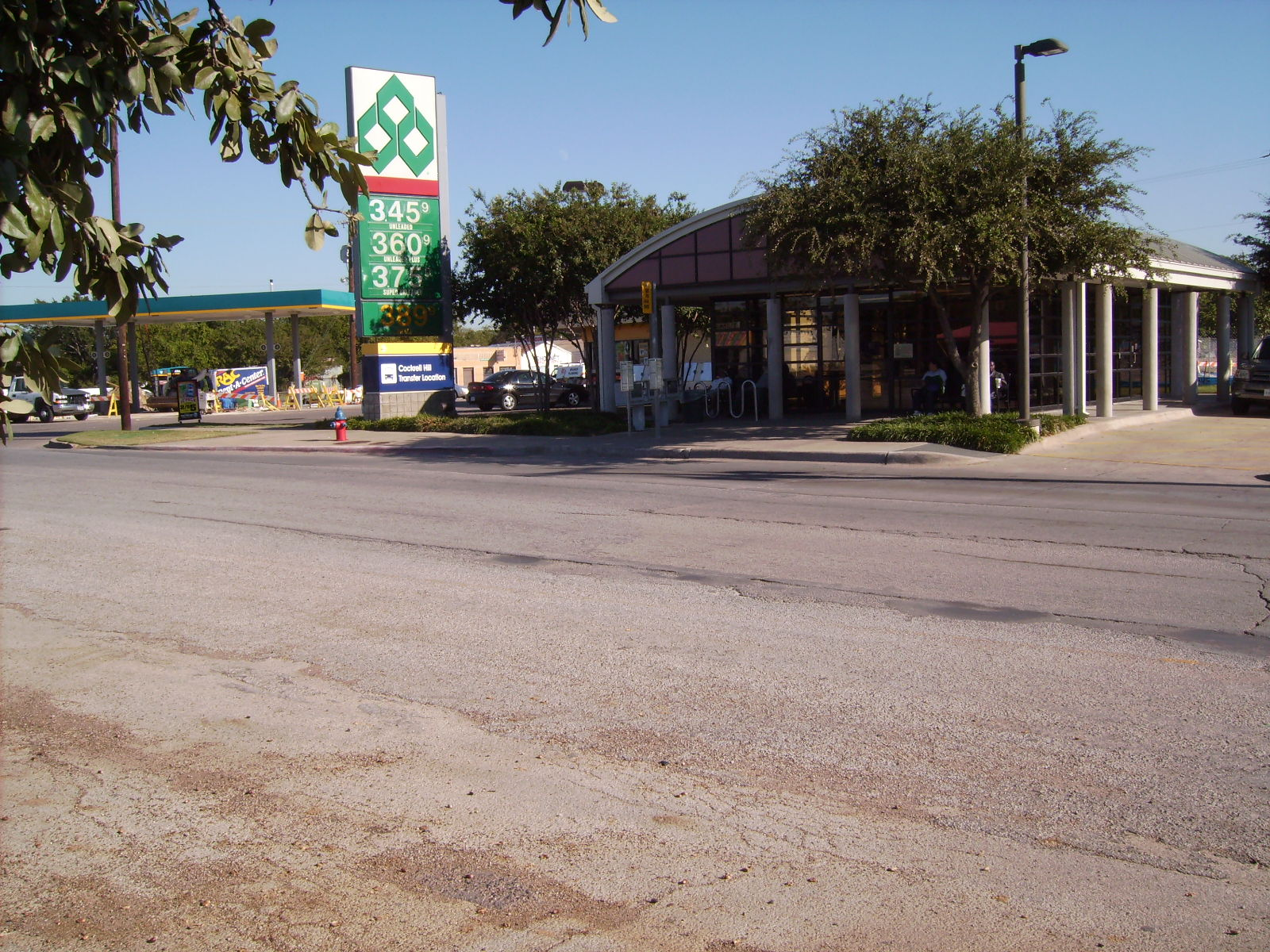

General information
- Location: 4430 West Jefferson Blvd. Cockrell Hill, Texas (Note: The station is located in Cockrell Hill city limits but has a Dallas postal code.)
- Coordinates: 32°44′13″N 96°53′32″W
- Owner: Dallas Area Rapid Transit
- Connections: DART: 9,25,221, and 226

Construction
- Cycle facilities: 1 rack
- Accessible: Yes

History
- Opened: July 31, 2000
Location

Cockrell Hill Transfer Location is a bus-only public transit station in Cockrell Hill, Texas. The station is operated by Dallas Area Rapid Transit and is located along Jefferson Boulevard at its intersection with Cockrell Hill Road.

The station features a small indoor, air-conditioned waiting area, restrooms, and an information desk, all of which are available during weekday peak hours. Bus routes at the station provide connections to Downtown Dallas and the Westmoreland station on DART's light rail system. Unlike most DART stations, parking is not available.

The station was opened on July 31, 2000 alongside the Bernal/Singleton Transfer Location as part of a larger $2 million plan to improve bus station amenities.
