= Canon EOS 6D Mark II =

2017 full-frame digital single-lens reflex camera

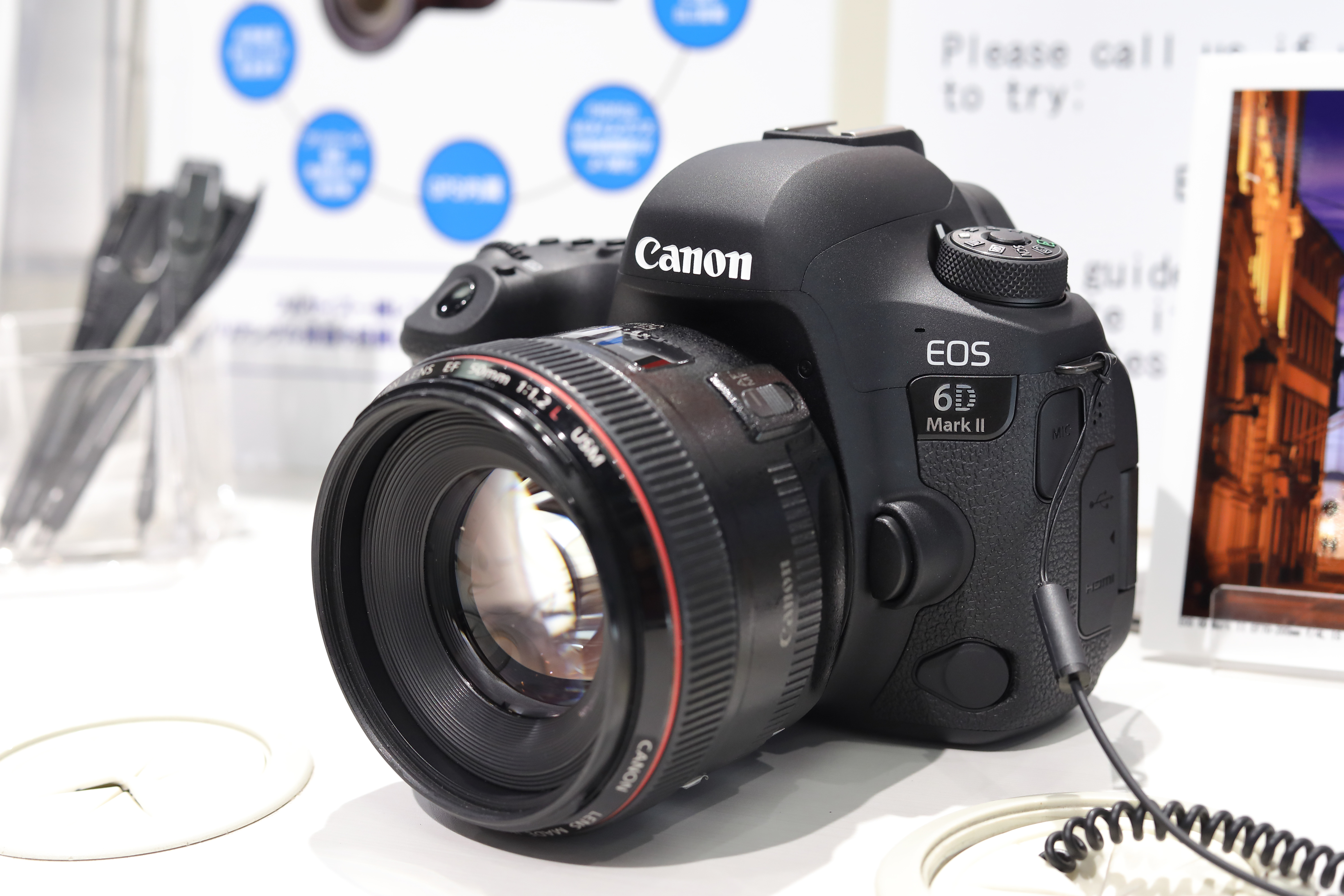

Overview
- Type: Digital single-lens reflex camera
- Intro price: US$1,999 (body only); US$2,599 (with 24-105mm IS STM lens); US$3,099 (with 24-105mm F/4L IS II USM lens)

Lens
- Lens mount: Canon EF
- Lens: Interchangeable (EF)

Sensor/medium
- Sensor type: CMOS
- Sensor size: 36 × 24 mm (Full-frame format)
- Maximum resolution: 6240 × 4160 (approx. 26.2 effective megapixels)
- Film speed: 100 – 40000, expandable from L: 50 to H1: 51200, H2: 102400
- Storage media: SD/SDHC/SDXC card (UHS-I bus supported)

Focusing
- Focus modes: One-Shot, AI Focus, AI Servo, Live View (FlexiZone - Multi, FlexiZone - Single, Face detection, Movie Servo)
- Focus areas: 45 cross-type AF points, the center point is sensitive down to EV -3 at f/2.8.
- Focus bracketing: N/A

Exposure/metering
- Exposure modes: Scene Intelligent Auto, Creative Auto, Special Scene (Group Photo, Kids, Food, Candlelight, Night Portrait, Handheld Night Scene, HDR Backlight Control, Portrait, Landscape, Close-up, Sports, Panning), Creative Filters, Program AE, Shutter priority AE, Aperture priority AE, Manual exposure, Movie
- Exposure metering: TTL, full aperture, 7560 pixels RGB + IR sensor
- Metering modes: Evaluative, Partial, Spot, Centre-weighted Average

Flash
- Flash: External
- Flash bracketing: N/A

Shutter
- Shutter: Electronic focal-plane
- Shutter speed range: 1/4000 s – 30 s, Bulb; X-sync at 1/180 s
- Continuous shooting: Up to 6.5 fps (at 1/500 s or faster) (4.5 fps in Live view mode)

Viewfinder
- Viewfinder: Optical pentaprism with 98% coverage and 0.71× magnification / LiveView LCD

Image processing
- Image processor: DIGIC 7
- White balance: Auto, Daylight, Shade, Cloudy, Tungsten, White Fluorescent, Flash, Kelvin temperature, Custom
- WB bracketing: Yes

General
- LCD screen: 3.0" (7.7 cm) Clear View II colour TFT vari-angle LCD touchscreen with 1,040,000 dots
- Battery: Li-Ion LP-E6N rechargeable; 1200 shots (CIPA rating)
- Optional battery packs: BG-E21 grip allows the use of one LP-E6/N/H battery or two LP-E6/N/H batteries
- Dimensions: 144.0 mm × 110.5 mm × 74.8 mm (5.67 in × 4.35 in × 2.94 in)
- Weight: 685 g (24.2 oz), excluding card and battery
- Latest firmware: 1.2.0 / 28 April 2023; 3 years ago
- Made in: Japan

Chronology
- Predecessor: Canon EOS 6D
- Successor: Canon EOS R6 (mirrorless)

The Canon EOS 6D Mark II is a 26.2-megapixel full-frame digital single-lens reflex camera announced by Canon on June 29, 2017.

Impressions from the Canon press event were mixed, with many saying the camera is "a sizeable upgrade, but feels dated". Critics point out that the EOS 6D Mark II does not support 4K video shooting and its 45 AF points are dense around the center, resulting in slower focus and recompose maneuvers when photographing moving subjects.

Canon discontinued production of the EOS 6D Mark II around mid-February 2024.

== Main features ==
New features over the EOS 6D are:

- New 26.2 megapixel CMOS sensor with Dual Pixel CMOS AF, (total 27.1 megapixels), instead of 20mp CMOS sensor with contrast detect.
- DIGIC 7, standard ISO 100–40000, expandable from L: 50 to H1: 51200, H2: 102400, compares (DIGIC 5+, ISO 100 – 25600, H 51200, H2 102400).
- New 7560-pixel RGB+IR metering sensor to aid the AF system
- 45 cross-type AF points, compared to 11, with center point as the only cross-type.
  - At f/8, autofocusing is only possible with the center AF point. However, 27 will autofocus when the body is attached to only 2 lens/teleconverter combination with a maximum aperture of f/8. The EF 100–400mm f/4.5–5.6L IS II lens, with Extender EF 1.4x III and EF 200–400mm f/4L IS Extender 1.4x lens, used with Extender EF 2x III (AF at 27 focus points, and the central 9 points acting as cross-type points). The EOS 6D Mark II is the first non-professional full-frame EOS body that can autofocus in this situation; previous non-professional bodies could not autofocus if the maximum aperture of an attached lens/teleconverter combination was smaller than f/5.6 (This feature had previously been included in three non-professional APS-C bodies: first the 80D, followed by the 77D and EOS 800D/Rebel T7i.)
  - At f/5.6, center AF point supporting down to EV -2.
  - With f/2.8 lens, AF sensitive down to EV -3.
- High-speed Continuous Shooting at up to 6.5 fps, 4 fps in Live view mode with Servo AF.
  - For anti-flicker shooting: max. approx. 5.6 shots/sec.
  - Low speed continuous shooting: 3 fps
- Built-in NFC and Bluetooth.
- 1080p at 60/50 fps video recording capability
- 4K time-lapse movie
- Built-in HDR and time-lapse recording capability
- Anti-flicker
- Flash Sync Speed 1/180
- Battery life: 1,200 shots (1,100 at 0°C/32°F). With live view: 380 shots (340 at 0°C/32°F).
- New Intelligent viewfinder with grid, dual axis electronic level, warning icons.
- Fully articulated touchscreen compared to fixed screen on the EOS 6D. This would make the 6D Mark II the only Full Frame Canon EOS DSLR to feature one.
- Supporting Panning mode in SCN.

== Custom firmware ==
Magic Lantern is an open-source (GPL) firmware add-on for Canon DSLR cameras, which has enhancements for video and still photography without replacing the stock firmware. The Canon EOS 6D Mark II is compatible with Magic Lantern firmware as of June 2025.

Type	Sensor	Class	00	01	02	03	04	05	06	07	08	09	10	11	12	13	14	15	16	17	18	19	20	21	22	23	24	25	26
DSLR	Full-frame	Flagship				1Ds		1Ds Mk II			1Ds Mk III					1D C													
DSLR	Full-frame	Flagship				1Ds		1Ds Mk II			1Ds Mk III				1D X					1D X Mk II ^{T}			1D X Mk III ^{T}						
DSLR	APS-H	Flagship			1D			1D Mk II	1D Mk II N		1D Mk III		1D Mk IV																
DSLR	Full-frame	Professional																	5DS / 5DS R										
DSLR	Full-frame	Professional							5D			_{x} 5D Mk II			_{x} 5D Mk III					5D Mk IV ^{T}									
DSLR	Full-frame	Advanced														_{x} 6D					_{x} 6D Mk II ^{AT}								
DSLR	APS-C	Advanced											_{x} 7D					_{x} 7D Mk II											
DSLR	APS-C	Mid-range						20Da								_{x} 60Da ^{A}													
DSLR	APS-C	Mid-range		D30	D60	10D		20D	30D		40D	_{x} 50D		_{x} 60D ^{A}			_{x} 70D ^{AT}		80D ^{AT}				90D ^{AT}						
DSLR	APS-C	Mid-range																	760D ^{AT}		77D ^{AT}								
DSLR	APS-C	Entry-level					300D	350D		400D	450D	_{x} 500D	_{x} 550D	_{x} 600D ^{A}		_{x} 650D ^{AT}	_{x} 700D ^{AT}		_{x} 750D ^{AT}		800D ^{AT}			850D ^{AT}					
DSLR	APS-C	Entry-level															_{x} 100D ^{T}		_{x} 200D ^{AT}				250D ^{AT}						
DSLR	APS-C	Entry-level										1000D		_{x} 1100D			_{x} 1200D			1300D		2000D							
DSLR	APS-C	Value																				4000D							
Early models			Canon EOS DCS 5 (1995); Canon EOS DCS 3 (1995); Canon EOS DCS 1 (1995); Canon EOS D2000 (1998); Canon EOS D6000 (1998)																										
Type	Sensor	Spec																											
Type	Sensor	Spec	00	01	02	03	04	05	06	07	08	09	10	11	12	13	14	15	16	17	18	19	20	21	22	23	24	25	26
