= Marco Antonio Bernal =

Mexican politician (1953–2025)

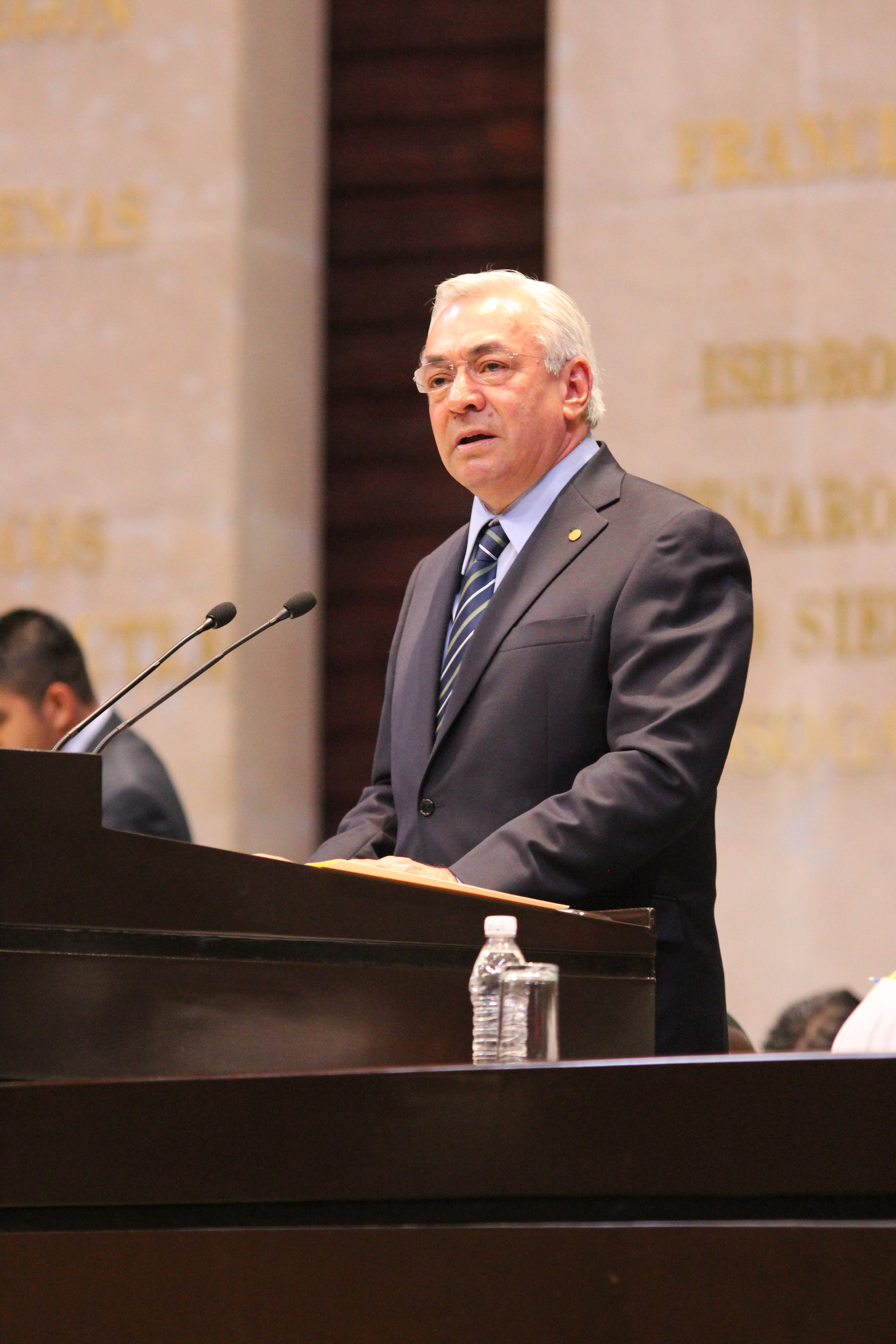
- Born: 30 November 1953; Matamoros, Tamaulipas, Mexico
- Died: 27 December 2025 (aged 72); Ciudad Victoria, Tamaulipas, Mexico
- Occupation: Politician
- Political party: PRI
- Spouse: María Esther Scherman Leaño

Andrés Marco Antonio Bernal Gutiérrez (Note: In this Spanish name, the first or paternal surname is Bernal and the second or maternal family name is Gutiérrez.) (30 November 1953 – 27 December 2025) was a Mexican politician affiliated with the Institutional Revolutionary Party (PRI). In 1985–1987 he was the federal government's Commissioner for Peace for negotiations in the Zapatista uprising in Chiapas. He later represented his party in both chambers of the Congress of the Union but was unsuccessful on the two occasions he sought its nomination to compete for the governorship of his home state of Tamaulipas.

== Life and career ==
Marco Antonio Bernal Gutiérrez was born on 30 November 1953 in the border city of Matamoros, Tamaulipas. In 1977 he earned a bachelor's degree in psychology from the Universidad Veracruzana and, in 1979, a master's in political science from El Colegio de México.

On 17 April 1995, President Ernesto Zedillo appointed Bernal as the federal government's commissioner for peace for negotiations with the Zapatista Army of National Liberation (EZLN) in the state of Chiapas; the San Andrés Larráinzar Accords of February 1996 were signed on his watch. He was replaced as commissioner by Pedro Joaquín Coldwell on 27 April 1997.

In the 1997 mid-term election he was elected as a national-list senator to the 57th Congress.

Bernal sought the PRI's nomination for the governorship of Tamaulipas for the first time in 1998 but lost to Tomás Yarrington.

In the 2006 general election he was elected to serve as plurinominal member of the Chamber of Deputies for the 60th Congress, and won his second plurinominal seat in the 2012 general election (62nd Congress).

In 2016, he again contended to be the PRI's candidate for governor of Tamaulipas but the nomination went instead to Baltazar Hinojosa; Francisco Javier García Cabeza de Vaca of the National Action Party (PAN) went on to defeat Hinojosa in the 5 June 2016 election.

In his later years, Bernal withdrew from politics and dedicated his efforts to the cultivation and export of citrus fruits.

Bernal died in Ciudad Victoria, Tamaulipas, on 27 December 2025 at the age of 72.
