= Astronomy Photographer of the Year =

Prize competition

A collection of prize-winning images from 2009 to 2014 published in book form

Astronomy Photographer of the Year is an annual astronomy photography competition and exhibition that is organised by the Royal Observatory, Greenwich (part of Royal Museums Greenwich).

The competition was launched in 2009 during the International Year of Astronomy. It has expanded significantly since this time and since 2016 the overall winner receives a prize of £10,000.

In 2018 the exhibition moved to the Photography Gallery at the National Maritime Museum, where the exhibition showed a 10-year retrospective of the competition's 31 winning images alongside 69 of the best winning images from the past nine years. Since then, each year's winning images have been showcased alongside the shortlisted images in the annual exhibition.

== Categories ==
Entrants can submit up to 10 images in the competition, which normally runs January–March.

2009-2014 categories:

- Earth and Space - Photographs featuring the night sky or twilight sky.
- Our Solar System - Photographs of the Moon, the Sun, and objects in the Solar System.
- Deep Space - Photographs of deep-space objects inside the Milky Way galaxy and beyond.
- People and Space Special Prize - Photographs of the night sky that include people or elements that show the presence or influence of human beings.
- Young Competition - Photographs taken by entrants aged 15 or under of any astronomical subject.

Since 2015 the categories have been:

- Aurorae - Photographs featuring the northern and southern lights (Aurora Borealis and Aurora Australis).
- Galaxies - Photographs of deep-space objects beyond the Milky Way galaxy, including galaxies, galaxy clusters and stellar associations.
- Our Moon - Photographs of the Moon, including lunar eclipses and the occultation of stars and planets, and the Moon alongside earthly scenery.
- Our Sun - Photographs of the Sun, including solar eclipses and transits, and the Sun alongside earthly scenery.
- People and Space - Photographs of the night sky that include people or elements that show the presence or influence of human beings.
- Planets, Comets and Asteroids - Photographs of objects in the Solar System, including planets and their satellites, comets, asteroids and other forms of zodiacal debris.
- Skyscapes - Photographs of landscapes, seascapes and cityscapes in which the night sky or twilight sky is a prominent feature.
- Stars and Nebulae - Photographs of deep-space objects in the Milky Way galaxy, including stars, star clusters, supernova remnants, nebulae and other galactic phenomena.
- The Sir Patrick Moore Prize for Best Newcomer Special Prize - Photographs of any astronomical subject taken by people who have only been practicing astronomy photography for one year and have not entered the competition before.
- The Robotic Scope Special Prize - Photographs taken with a remotely operated robotic telescope which is publicly accessible.
- The Young Competition - Photographs taken by entrants aged 15 or under of any astronomical subject.

Since 2020 the categories have been:

- Aurorae - Photographs featuring the northern and southern lights (Aurora Borealis and Aurora Australis).
- Galaxies - Photographs of deep-space objects beyond the Milky Way galaxy, including galaxies, galaxy clusters and stellar associations.
- Our Moon - Photographs of the Moon, including lunar eclipses and the occultation of stars and planets, and the Moon alongside earthly scenery.
- Our Sun - Photographs of the Sun, including solar eclipses and transits, and the Sun alongside earthly scenery.
- People and Space - Photographs of the night sky that include people or elements that show the presence or influence of human beings.
- Planets, Comets and Asteroids - Photographs of objects in the Solar System, including planets and their satellites, comets, asteroids and other forms of zodiacal debris.
- Skyscapes - Photographs of landscapes, seascapes and cityscapes in which the night sky or twilight sky is a prominent feature. Star trails and images of noctilucent and nacreous clouds, halos, meteors and other upper atmospheric phenomena may also be entered into this category.
- Stars and Nebulae - Photographs of deep-space objects in the Milky Way galaxy, including stars, star clusters, supernova remnants, nebulae and other galactic phenomena.
- The Manju Mehrotra Family Trust Prize for Best Newcomer Special Prize - Photographs of any astronomical subject taken by people who have only been practicing astronomy photography for one year and have not entered the competition before.
- The Annie Maunder Prize for Image Innovation Special Prize - For images processed using pre-existing open source data.
- The Young Competition - Photographs taken by entrants aged 15 or under of any astronomical subject.

== Judging ==
Entries are judged anonymously by a panel of judges. Up to 140 images are shortlisted and are included in the annual publication. In the adult competition, the judges select a winner, runner-up and highly commended image in each category and one winner for each of the special prizes. In the young competition, a winner, runner-up and three highly commended images are chosen. The overall winner, the Insight Astronomy Photographer of the Year, is chosen from the category winners in the adult competition.

The panels of judges have included:

- Alan Sparrow – Chair of the UK Picture Editors Guild.
- Chris Bramley (editor of the BBC Sky at Night magazine)
- Chris Lintott (Astronomer at the University of Oxford and co-presenter of The Sky at Night)
- Damian Peach (Astrophotographer and planetary observer)
- Dan Holdsworth (Fine-art photographer)
- Ed Robinson (photographer)
- Emily Drabek-Maunder – Manager of Public Astronomy at Royal Museums Greenwich.
- Graham Southorn (Former Editor of the BBC Sky at Night magazine))
- Imad Ahmed – Director of the New Crescent Society
- Jon Culshaw (Comedian, impersonator and regular guest on The Sky at Night)
- László Francsics – Chairman of the Hungarian Astrophotographers' Association and 2019 Overall Winner.
- Maggie Aderin-Pocock (space scientist, science writer and broadcaster)
- Marek Kukula (Former Public Astronomer at Royal Museums Greenwich)
- Melanie Grant (Picture Editor of Intelligent Life magazine at The Economist)
- Melanie Vandenbrouck (curator at Royal Museums Greenwich)
- Melissa Brobby – Journalist, science communicator and Social Media Officer for the Institute of Physics.
- Oana Sandu (community coordinator for the European Southern Observatory)
- Olivia Johnson (Astronomy educator and former Astronomy Programmes Manager at the Royal Observatory Greenwich)
- Pete Lawrence (world-class astrophotographer, presenter of The Sky at Night)
- Rebecca Roth (photographer at NASA's Goddard Space Flight Center)
- Sarah Pickering (artist and Teaching Fellow at the Slade School of Fine Art)
- Will Gater (astronomer, journalist and astrophotographer)
- Rebecca Higgitt (Historian of science and former Curator of the History of Science and Technology at Royal Museums Greenwich)
- Sheila Kanani – Education, Outreach and Diversity officer for the Royal Astronomical Society.
- Sir Patrick Moore (astronomer, writer and broadcaster)
- Steve Marsh – Art Editor at the BBC Sky at Night Magazine.
- Sue Prichard – Curator of Arts at Royal Museums Greenwich.
- Wolfgang Tillmans (Turner prize winning artist)
- Yuri Beletsky – Astrophotographer and astronomer at Las Campanas Observatory.

== Overall winners ==
- 2009 - 'Horsehead Nebula' by Martin Pugh
- 2010 - 'Blazing Bristlecone' by Thomas Lowe
- 2011 - 'Jupiter with lo and Ganymede - September 2010' by Damian Peach
- 2012 - 'M51 The Whirlpool Galaxy' by Martin Pugh
- 2013 - 'Guiding Light to the Stars' by Mark Gee
- 2014 - 'Aurora over a Glacier Lagoon' by James Woodend
- 2015 – Eclipse Totality over Sassendalen – a skyscape by Luc Jamet showing the solar eclipse of March 20, 2015
- 2016 - 'Baily's Beads' by Yun Jun
- 2017 - 'The Rho Ophiuchi Clouds' by Artem Mironov
- 2018 - 'Transport the Soul' by Brad Goldpaint
- 2019 - 'Into the Shadow' by László Francsics
- 2020 - 'Andromeda Galaxy at Arm's Length' by Nicolas Lefaudeux
- 2021 - 'The Golden Ring' by Shuchang Dong
- 2022 - 'Disconnection Event' by Gerald Rhemann

== Equipment analysis ==
The astrophotography website Skies & Scopes conducted a data analysis of equipment data made public from all 685 shortlisted images for the Astronomy Photographer of the Year competition from 2018 to 2022. It found that the Canon EOS 6D was the most successfully used astrophotography camera overall. The number of shortlisted images using mirrorless cameras increased each year, with Sony models dominating the mirrorless category. ZWO was the leading manufacturer of dedicated astronomy cameras. For telescopes, Celestron models are most successful, and for mounts, Sky-Watcher dominates. The Sky-Watcher Star Adventurer was the most successfully used star tracker.
