= Bernal/Singleton Transfer Location =

Bus station in West Dallas, Texas

Coordinates: 32.7792°N 96.9053°W

General information
- Location: 5151 Singleton Blvd. Dallas, Texas
- Owner: Dallas Area Rapid Transit
- Connections: DART: 25 and 128; West Dallas GoLink Zone (M-Sun)

Construction
- Cycle facilities: 1 bike rack
- Accessible: Yes

History
- Opened: July 31, 2000
Location

Bernal/Singleton Transfer Location is a bus-only public transit station in Dallas, Texas. The station is located in West Dallas at the intersection of Bernal Drive and Singleton Boulevard. It is operated by Dallas Area Rapid Transit and serves two bus routes, as well as a microtransit service for the West Dallas area.

The station features an indoor air-conditioned waiting area, restrooms, and an information desk. Bus routes at the station provide connections to Downtown Dallas, the DART rail station Westmoreland, and the Trinity Railway Express station Downtown Irving/Heritage Crossing. Unlike most DART stations, parking is not available.

== History ==
In 1999, DART announced the construction of a bus transfer station on a 2-acre site in West Dallas. The project was part of a larger $2 million plan to improve the system's bus station amenities. The station opened on July 31, 2000, alongside the Cockrell Hill Transfer Location.

In 2007, DART released its 2030 Transit System plan, which detailed several future project proposals. Among the proposals included was the West Dallas Corridor, a rail line between Downtown Dallas and the western end of Loop 12 (with a possible extension to the former Dallas Naval Air Station near Grand Prairie). This corridor, if constructed, would include Bernal/Singleton Transfer Location as its terminus.
