= Bernal, Querétaro =

Coordinates: 20°44′20″N 99°56′24″W

Bernal Ma'hando (Otomian languages)
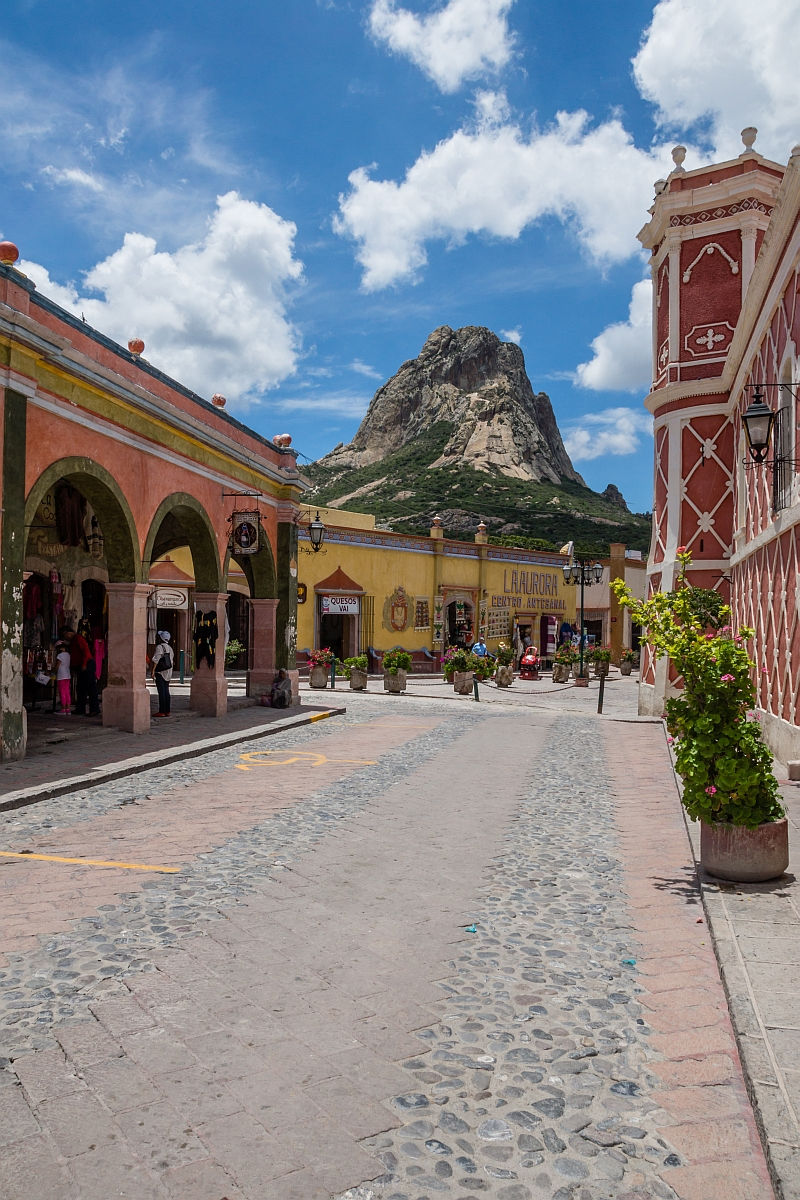
- Bernal and the Peña de Bernal
- Interactive map of Bernal
- Country: Mexico
- State: Querétaro
- Municipality: Ezequiel Montes
- Founded: 1647

Population
  - Total: 3,965
- Time zone: UTC-6 (CST)

San Sebastián Bernal, better known as Bernal (Spanish: [beɾˈnal]; from Basque Vernal, "place of stones or boulders"), is a colonial village in the Mexican state of Querétaro. It was founded in 1642 by Spanish soldier Alonso Cabrera.

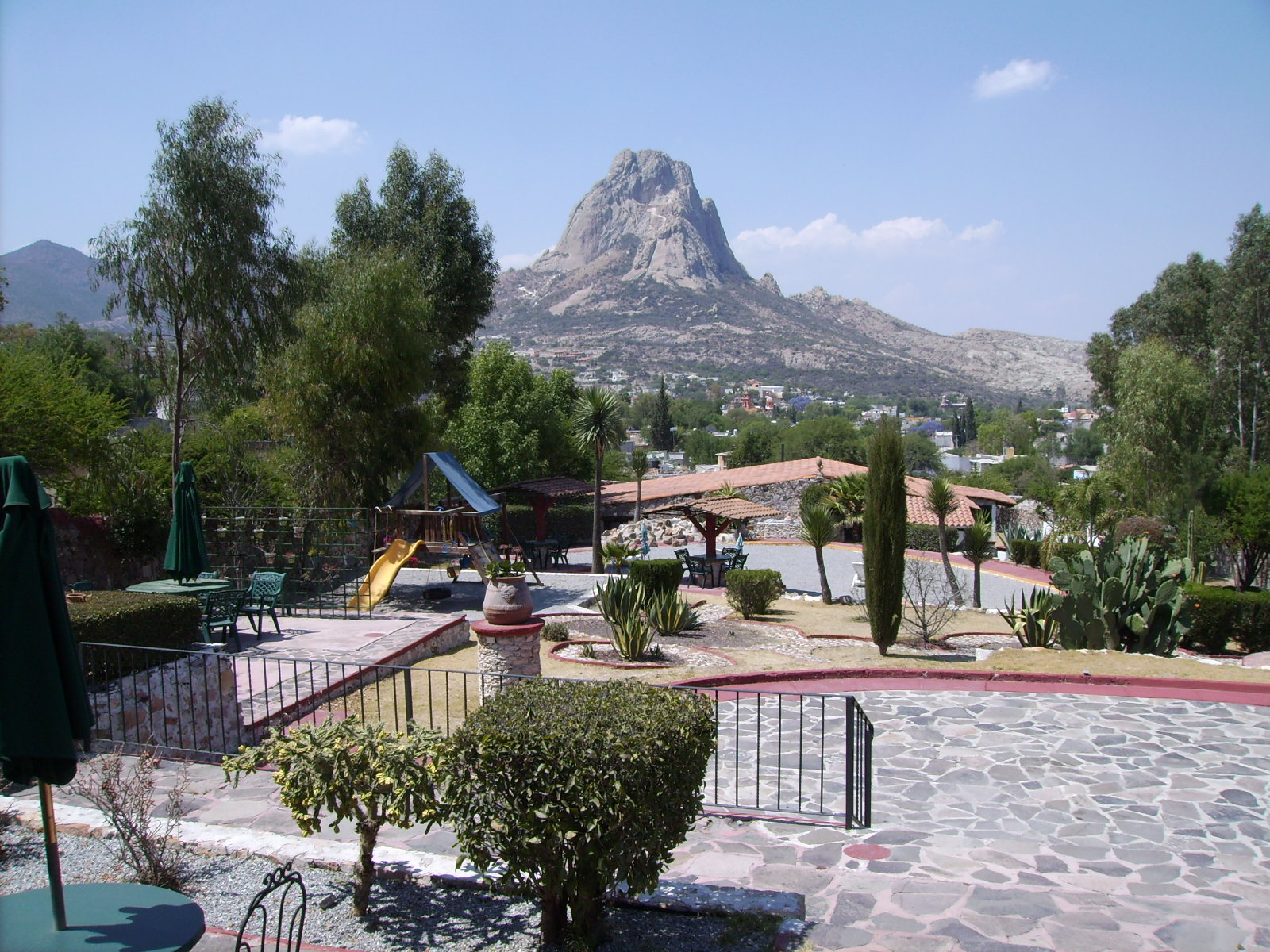
Peña de Bernal

Bernal is located 40 minutes by road from state capital Santiago de Querétaro and two and a half hours from Mexico City. It is located in Ezequiel Montes municipality, a few minutes from Colón and Cadereyta.

It has a current population of 2909, of which 1377 are males and 1532 are females. A total of 1014 persons are counted as Economic Active Population and there are only 630 inhabited homes in town.

It is known for its enormous monolith of massive rock, the Peña de Bernal, the third highest on the planet.

According to chronicler Omar Ortega Paz, its names in the Otomi language (De'hendo) and in Chichimeca (Ma'hando) have the same meaning: "In the middle of two".

In 2005, Bernal was designated a Pueblo Mágico ("Magical Town") by the Mexican Secretariat of Tourism (SECTUR). The Magical Towns are admitted for being localities that have magic symbolic attributes, legends, history, transcendental facts that associate in each of its cultural manifestations, and that today mean a great opportunity for tourism.

== Climate ==
Climate data for Bernal, Querétaro (1981-2010), extremes (1973–present)
Month	Jan	Feb	Mar	Apr	May	Jun	Jul	Aug	Sep	Oct	Nov	Dec	Year
Record high °C (°F)	30.0 (86.0)	33.0 (91.4)	40.0 (104.0)	40.0 (104.0)	38.0 (100.4)	37.0 (98.6)	35.0 (95.0)	33.0 (91.4)	33.0 (91.4)	36.0 (96.8)	32.0 (89.6)	31.0 (87.8)	40.0 (104.0)
Mean daily maximum °C (°F)	22.7 (72.9)	24.5 (76.1)	27.4 (81.3)	29.7 (85.5)	29.3 (84.7)	27.3 (81.1)	25.2 (77.4)	25.7 (78.3)	24.7 (76.5)	24.3 (75.7)	24.5 (76.1)	23.0 (73.4)	25.7 (78.3)
Daily mean °C (°F)	13.4 (56.1)	15.0 (59.0)	17.6 (63.7)	19.9 (67.8)	20.2 (68.4)	19.6 (67.3)	18.3 (64.9)	18.6 (65.5)	18.0 (64.4)	16.9 (62.4)	15.6 (60.1)	14.0 (57.2)	17.3 (63.1)
Mean daily minimum °C (°F)	4.1 (39.4)	5.4 (41.7)	7.9 (46.2)	10.2 (50.4)	11.1 (52.0)	12.0 (53.6)	11.5 (52.7)	11.4 (52.5)	11.3 (52.3)	9.4 (48.9)	6.7 (44.1)	5.0 (41.0)	8.8 (47.8)
Record low °C (°F)	−9.0 (15.8)	−6.0 (21.2)	−2.0 (28.4)	2.0 (35.6)	4.0 (39.2)	6.0 (42.8)	1.0 (33.8)	0.5 (32.9)	4.0 (39.2)	−4.0 (24.8)	−5.0 (23.0)	−8.0 (17.6)	−9.0 (15.8)
Average precipitation mm (inches)	10.0 (0.39)	6.0 (0.24)	11.8 (0.46)	25.1 (0.99)	39.4 (1.55)	70.8 (2.79)	94.2 (3.71)	80.6 (3.17)	72.1 (2.84)	41.5 (1.63)	11.9 (0.47)	2.1 (0.08)	465.5 (18.33)
Average precipitation days (≥ 0.1 mm)	1.6	1.3	1.6	2.7	5.1	7.1	7.9	7.2	8.1	4.4	1.5	0.8	49.3
Source: Servicio Meteorológico Nacional (temperature, 1981-2010)

== See also ==
- Bernal - Estado de Querétaro photo gallery.
