= Royal Museums Greenwich =

Network of museums in Greenwich, London

Royal Museums Greenwich is an organisation comprising four museums in Greenwich, east London, illustrated below. The Royal Museums Greenwich Foundation is a Private Limited Company by guarantee without share capital use of 'Limited' exemption, company number 08002287, incorporated on 22 March 2012. It is registered as charity number 1147279.

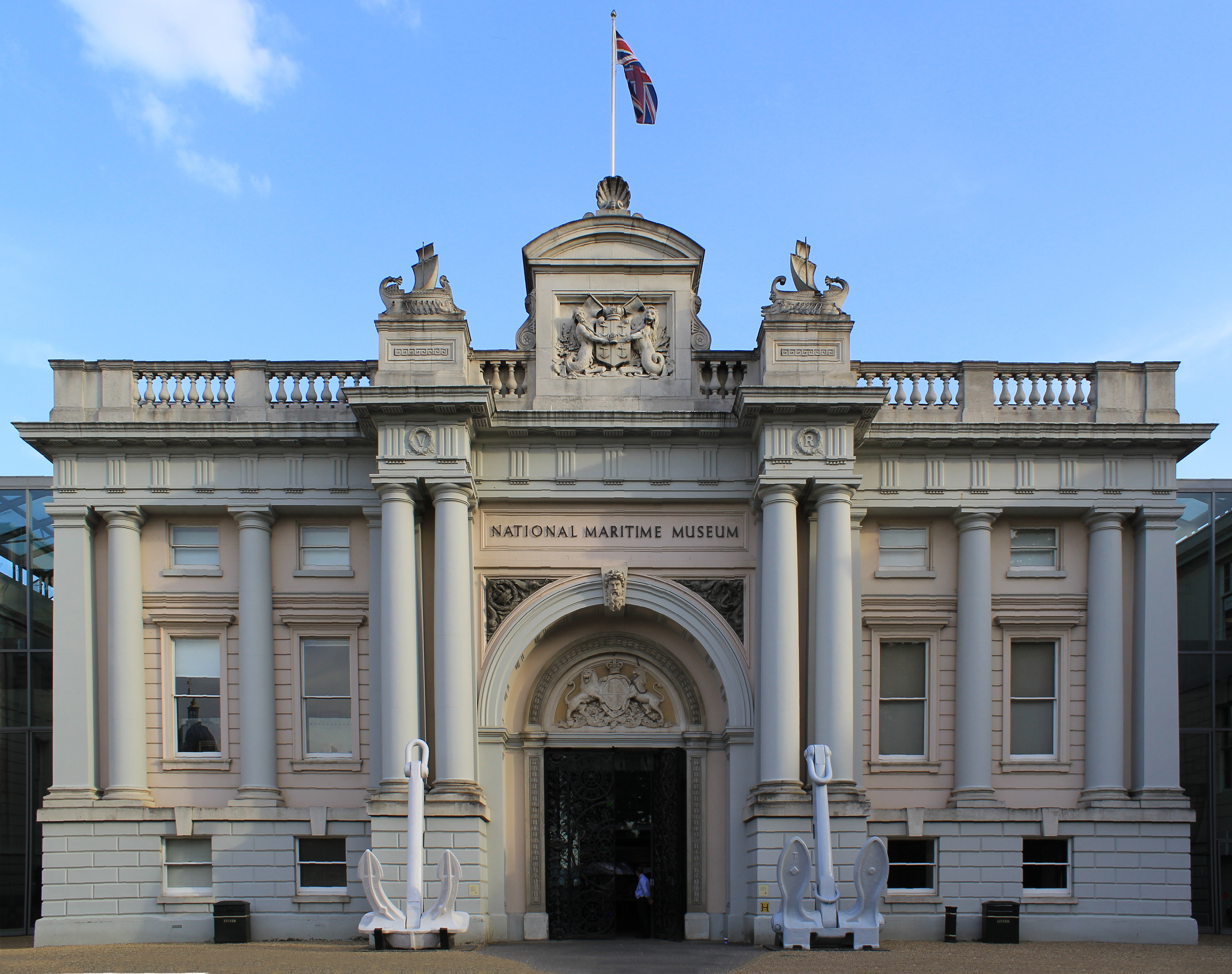
National Maritime Museum

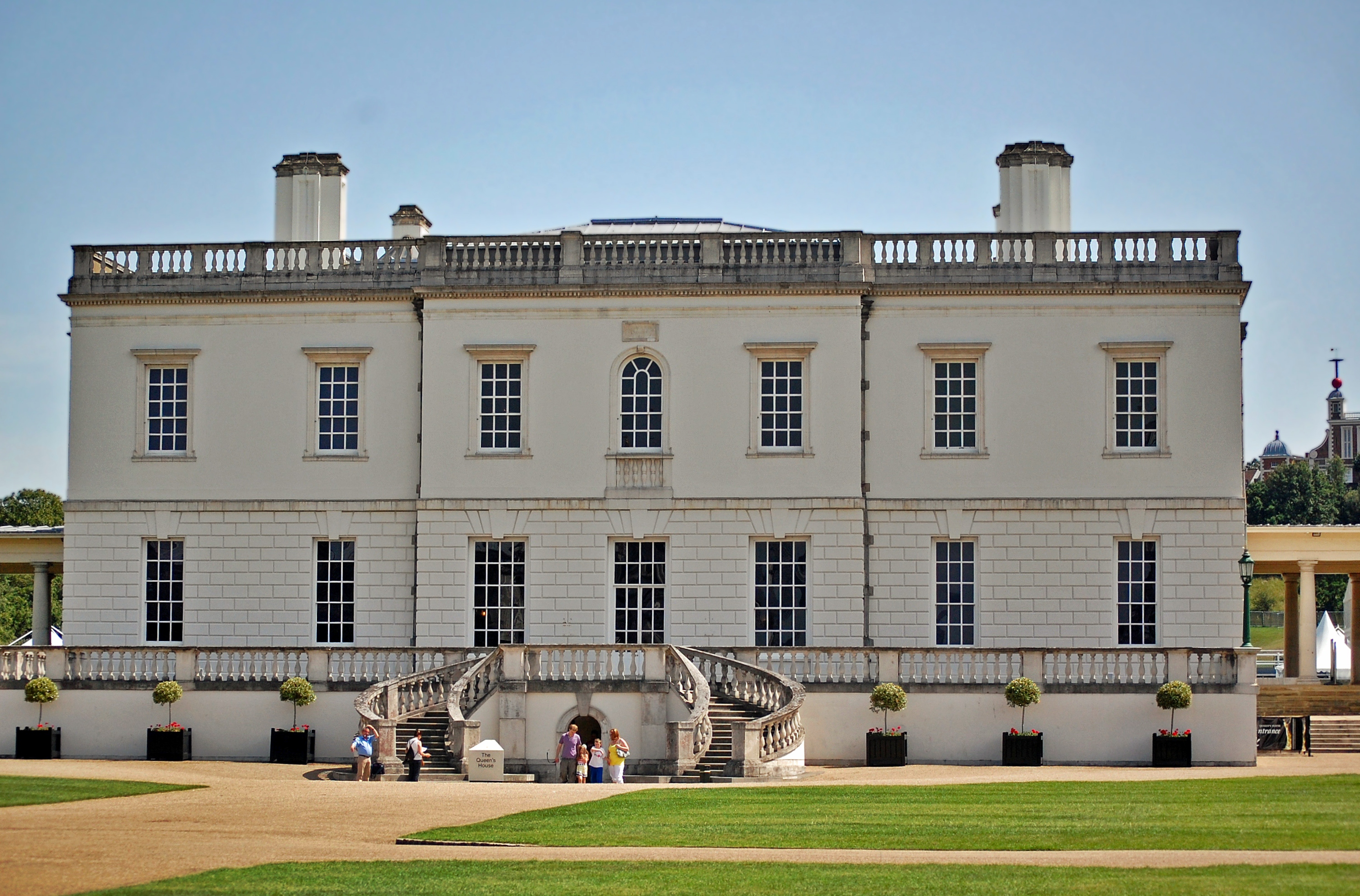
Queen's House

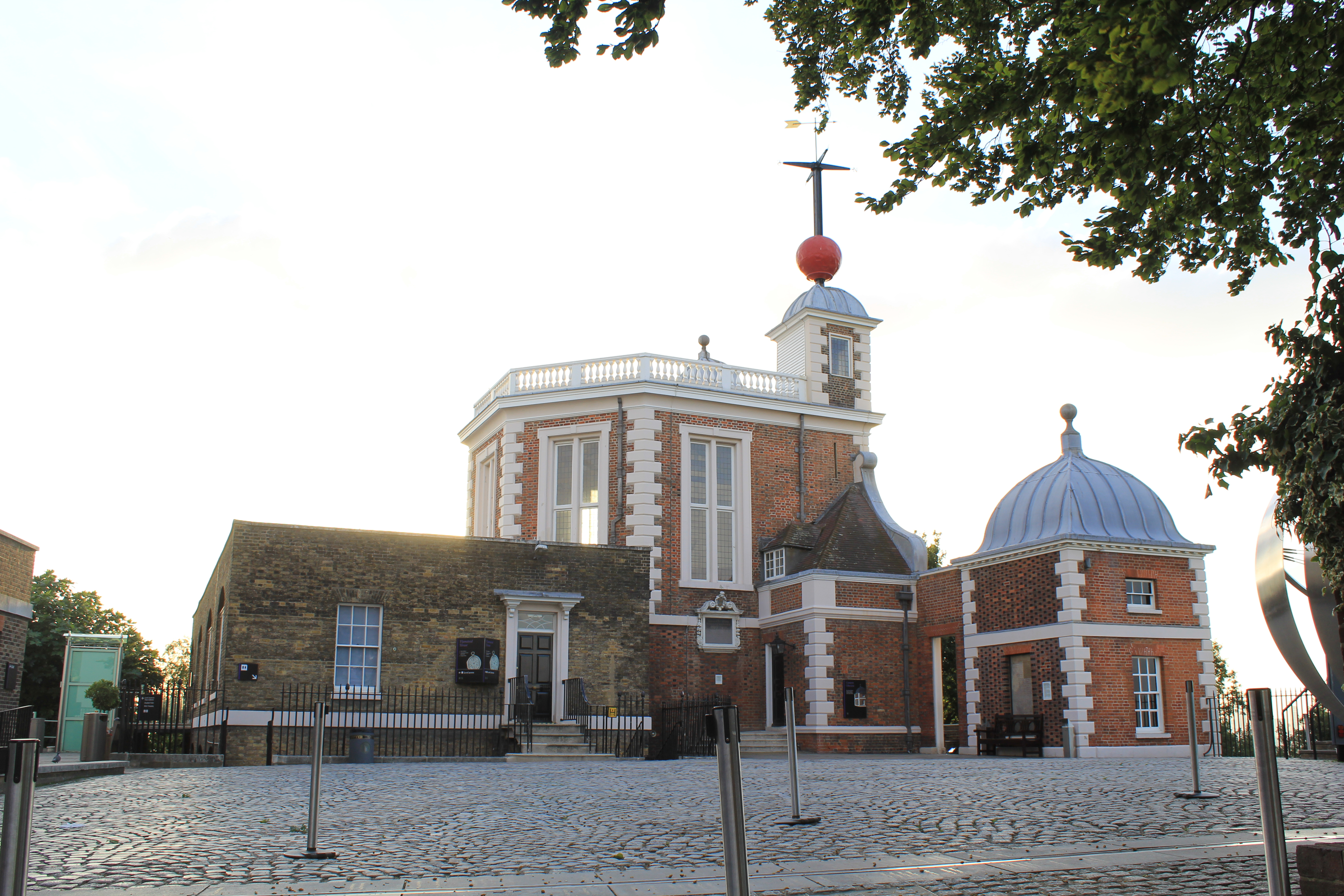
Royal Observatory, Greenwich

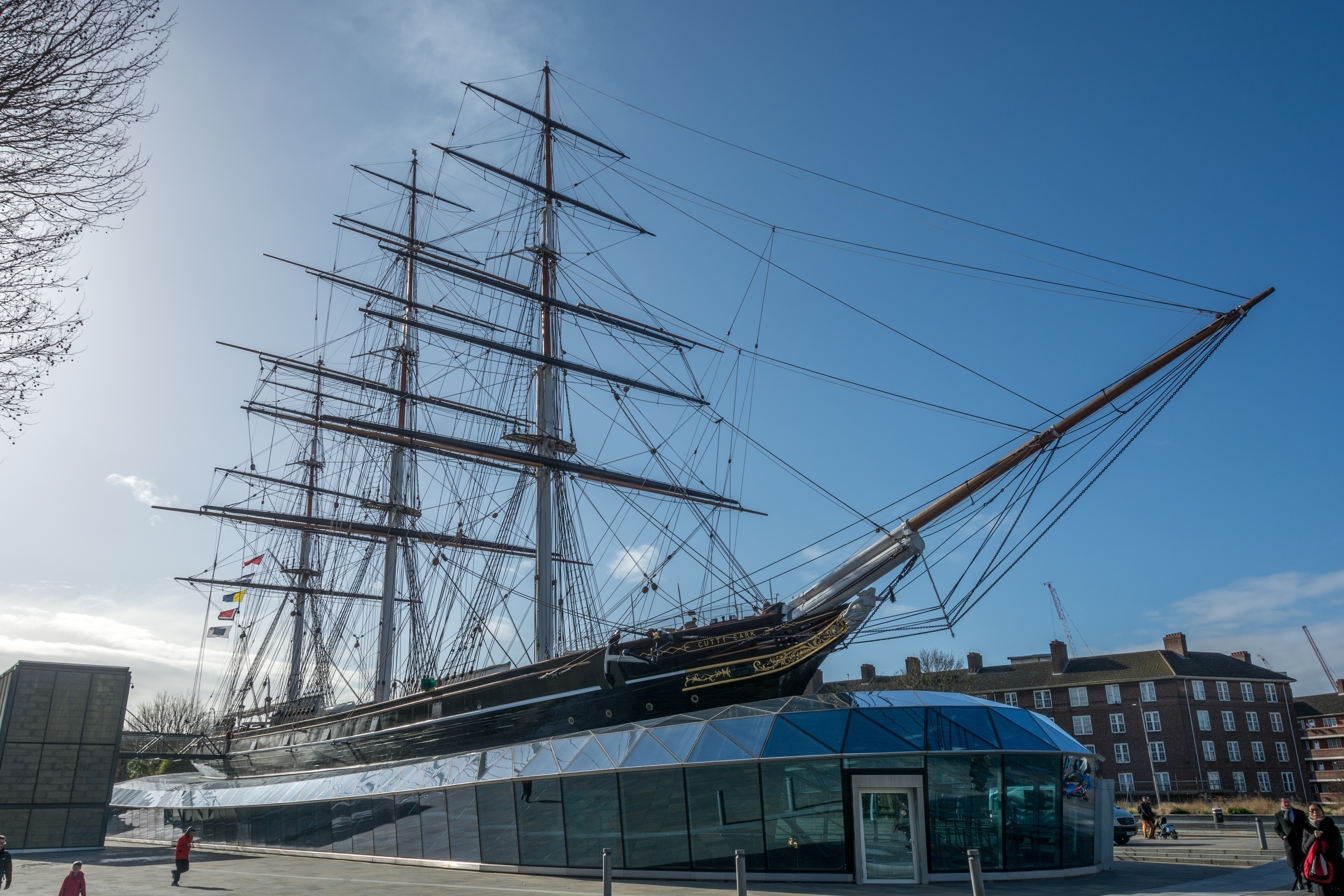
Cutty Sark

In 2025, the museums aggregated 2,817,852 visitors.

== 2025 Activities ==
In October 2025, Royal Museums Greenwich hosted the Queer Migrations Festival, a community event exploring the connections between queerness and migration through art, performances, and workshops. Activities took place at the Firepit Art Gallery and as part of PARKSfest. The festival highlighted stories of transnational bodies, identity, and generations, with a particular emphasis on LGBTQ+ rights and intersectional feminism. The event attracted queer activists and artists from across the United Kingdom. This cultural initiative promoted inclusion within historic spaces, aligning with broader debates on migration and gender rights in the post-Brexit era.
