= Augustin Bernal Park =

237 acre park near Pleasanton, California

Coordinates: 37°38′11″N 121°54′16″W

Augustin Bernal Community Park
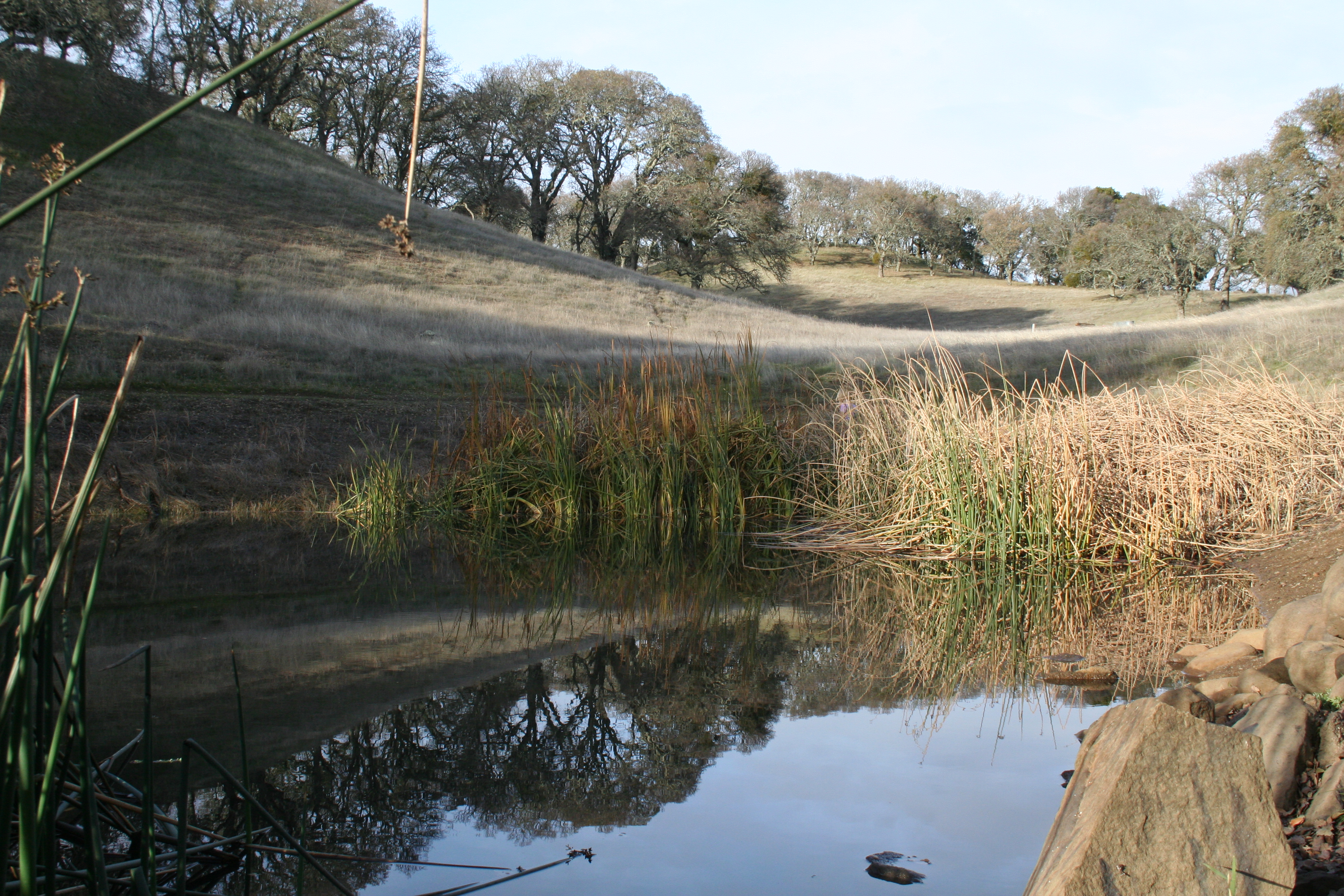
- Pond in Augustin Bernal Park
- Interactive map of Augustin Bernal Community Park
- Location: Alameda County, California
- Nearest city: Pleasanton, California
- Area: 237 acres (0.96 km^{2})
- Created: 1971
- Operator: Pleasanton, California

Augustin Bernal Community Park is a 237-acre (0.96 km^{2}) park in the hills southwest of Pleasanton, California.

The park was donated to the city in 1971 by Walter S. Johnson, (Note: Walter S. Johnson was a philanthropist who was noted for his financial support for the restoration of San Francisco's Palace of Fine Arts. The park is now owned and operated by the City of Pleasanton.) and connects to Pleasanton Ridge Regional Park. The park is named for the Spanish settler Augustin Bernal, to whom the land on which the park sits was originally granted.

Access to the park's public staging area is through a gated community, Golden Eagle Farms. Pleasanton residents can show proof of residency to get past the community's gate at Golden Eagle Way and Foothill Road; non-residents can obtain a one-week permit at Pleasanton's Department of Parks and Community Services. The Community Services office is at 200 Old Bernal Ave in Pleasanton.
