= Peña de Bernal =

Mountain in Querétaro, Mexico

Coordinates: 20°44′53.5″N 99°56′55″W

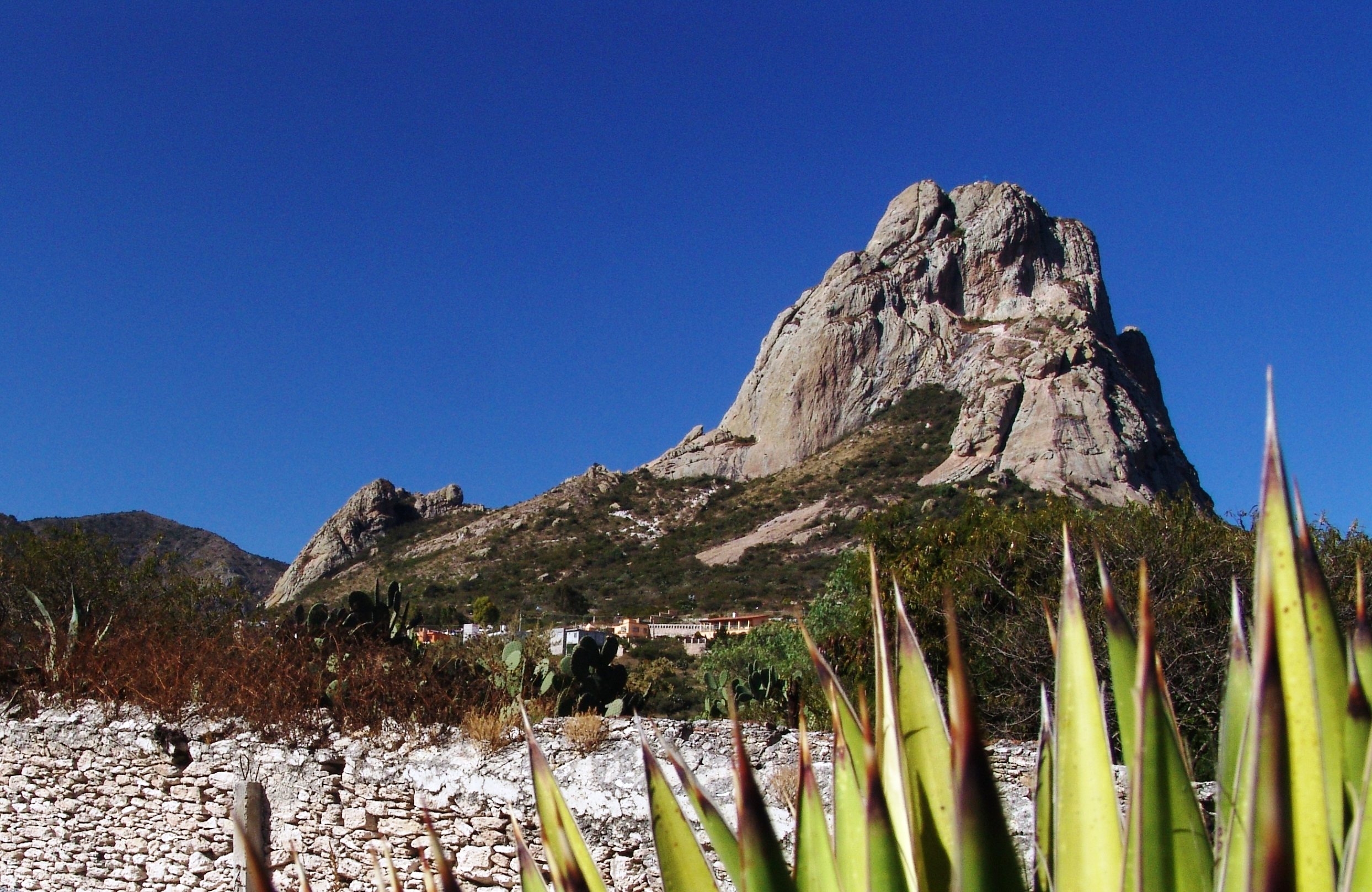

Highest point
- Elevation: 2,510 m (8,230 ft) AMSL
- Prominence: 350 m (1,150 ft)

Naming
- English translation: Rock of Bernal
- Language of name: Spanish

Geography
- Location within Mexico
- Location: San Sebastián Bernal, Querétaro, Mexico
- Parent range: Sierra Gorda

Geology
- Rock age: 8.7 million years
- Mountain type: Porphyrytic monolith

Peña de Bernal (Spanish pronunciation: [ˈpeɲa ðe βeɾˈnal]; English: Bernal's Boulder or Bernal Peak) is a 433-metre (1,421 ft) monolith, one of the tallest in the world. It is located in San Sebastián Bernal, a small town in the Mexican state of Querétaro. It is one of the most touristic sites near the capital of Querétaro.

Geological studies indicate the rock is the exposed core of an ancient volcano. Following its extinction, the lava in the interior became solid and most of the rest of the volcano eroded over millions of years. The solidified magma that remains is what constitutes and shapes the monolith.

The porphyrytic monolith was once thought to have been formed during the Jurassic period. A recent chemical analysis by researchers at the National Autonomous University of Mexico has determined that it is considerably younger, likely formed about 8.7 million years ago.

Many people perform a pilgrimage to the small chapel located at the highest point accessible through hiking.
