= Susan Bernal =

Colombian materials scientist

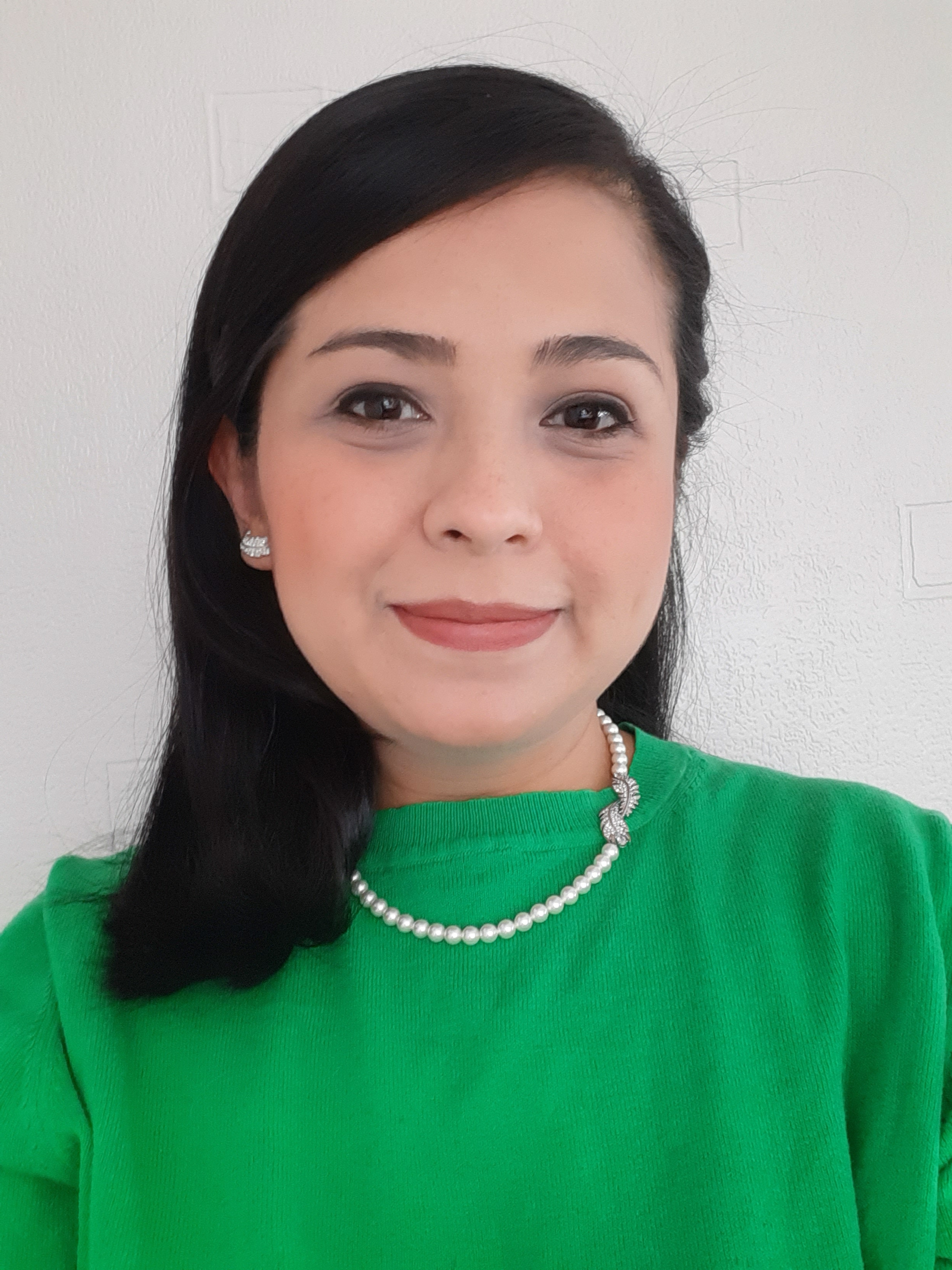
- Born: 1982 (age 43–44); Bogotá, Colombia
- Education: University of Valle
- Scientific career
- Workplaces: University of Sheffield; University of Melbourne; University of Aarhus; University of Leeds; University of Bath

Susan Andrea Bernal López (born 1982) is a Colombian materials scientist who is Professor of Sustainable Construction Materials at the University of Bath. Her research considers design, development and characterisation of novel cements and concretes. She was awarded the 2020 Institute of Materials, Minerals and Mining Rosenhain Medal and Prize.

== Early life and education ==
Bernal was born in Bogotá, Colombia. She was an undergraduate and postgraduate student at the University of Valle, where she worked on alkali-activated cements (so-called geopolymers). Specifically, her doctoral research considered the carbonation of concretes that are based on alkaline activated slag. She worked with Ruby Mejía de Gutiérrez, a professor of materials science, on a number of papers and they registered a patent together. During her doctorate she carried out two internships, one supported by the United States Department of Energy to work at the Argonne National Laboratory, and one at the University of Melbourne.

== Research and career ==
After graduating, Bernal moved to Aarhus University, where she spent a year as a postdoctoral fellow at the iNANO Instrument Center of the University of Aarhus (INANO).

In 2010, Bernal moved to the University of Melbourne, where she continued to work on geopolymers. Bernal was appointed as research fellow at the University of Sheffield in 2012, where she investigated alternatives to conventional cements and concretes. Concrete is one of the world's most popular building materials, and contributes to five to eight percent of global carbon dioxide emissions. She was made a lecturer in 2015.

In 2018, Bernal moved to the University of Leeds, where she continued to develop novel cements and concretes that are more sustainable and durable. In particular, she made use of natural clays and industrial waste. She joined the University of Leeds as an academic fellow and she became a professor there in 2019. In 2024 she relocated to the University of Bath, as a professor in the Department of Architecture and Civil Engineering.

== Awards and recognitions ==
- 2005 Colombian Innovation Agency (COLCIENCIAS) Scholarship
- 2008 Walter Mangold Trust Fund scholarship
- 2016 University of Valle Distinguished Graduate Award
- 2016 RILEM (Réunion Internationale des Laboratoires et Experts des Matériaux, systèmes de construction et ouvrages) Gustavo Colonnetti medal
- 2019 Institution of Civil Engineers Advances in Cement Research Prize
- 2020 IOM3 Rosenhain Medal and Prize
- 2021 Materials Research Society Kavli Early Career Lectureship in Materials Science
- 2022 RILEM Robert L'Hermite Medal
- 2024 RILEM Fellow

== Selected publications ==
- John L. Provis; Susan A. Bernal (2014). "Geopolymers and Related Alkali-Activated Materials". Annual Review of Materials Research. 44 (1): 299–327. doi:10.1146/annurev-matsci-070813-113515. Wikidata Q61848737.
- Idawati Ismail; Susan A. Bernal; John L. Provis; Rackel San Nicolas; Sinin Hamdan; Jannie S.J. van Deventer (2014). "Modification of phase evolution in alkali-activated blast furnace slag by the incorporation of fly ash". Cement and Concrete Composites. 45: 125–135. doi:10.1016/j.cemconcomp.2013.09.006. Wikidata Q61848742.
- Susan A. Bernal; John L. Provis; Volker Rose; Ruby Mejía de Gutierrez (2011). "Evolution of binder structure in sodium silicate-activated slag-metakaolin blends". Cement and Concrete Composites. 33 (1): 46–54. doi:10.1016/j.cemconcomp.2010.09.004. Wikidata Q61848767.
