= Delfina Bernal =

Colombian artist (born 1941)

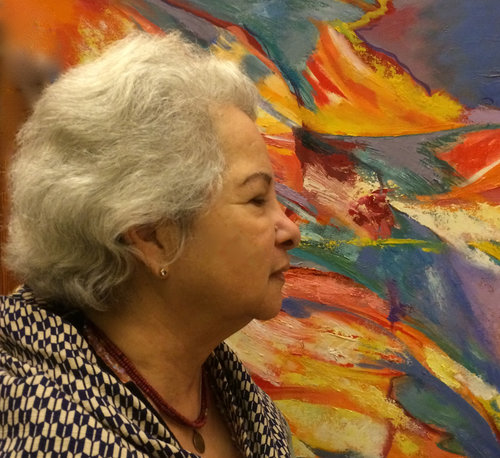
- Born: 1941 (age 84–85); Barranquilla, Colombia
- Education: Alejandro Obregón at Escuela de Bellas Artes, Barranquilla; Ben Bianchi at Parsons School of Design
- Known for: Painting
- Notable work: Carta de Amor a Jeff Perone

Delfina Bernal (born 1941 in Barranquilla, Colombia) is a Colombian painter and multimedia artist.

== Life ==
Delfina Bernal studied painting and sculpture at the Escuela de las Bellas Artes in Barranquilla, Colombia. She studied with the institute's director Alejandro Obregón and teachers Marie Claire de Andreis, Freda Sargent de Obregón, and María Luisa Andino de Lopez. She studied engraving with Ben Bianchi at the Parsons School of Design in the 1970s.

She was a founding member in 1973 of “Grupo 44”, along with Álvaro Herazo, Eduardo Hernandez, Victor Sanchez, Fernando Cepeda, Jairo Quintero and Christiane Lesueur. Their work culminated in the exhibition La fotografía como documento en el arte conceptual de Barranquilla, curated by Alvaro Barrios, where Bernal exhibited her work Declaración de amor a Jeff Perrone.

She has lived for two periods of her work and life in the United States. The first from 1968 to 1973 in New York City, and from 1981 to the present in San Francisco, California. She continues to work in several mediums including painting, etchings, collage, digital prints and photography.

== Exhibitions and awards ==
- 1964: First Intercol Salon of Young Artists of 1964, Third Prize Acquisition
- 1964: Colombia Esso Salon, Second Honorable Mention
- 1980: The Photograph as Document in Conceptual art from Barranquilla
- 2017: Radical Women, Armand Hammer Museum, University of California Los Angeles
- 2018: Radical Women, Brooklyn Museum
