= Juan Bernal Ponce =

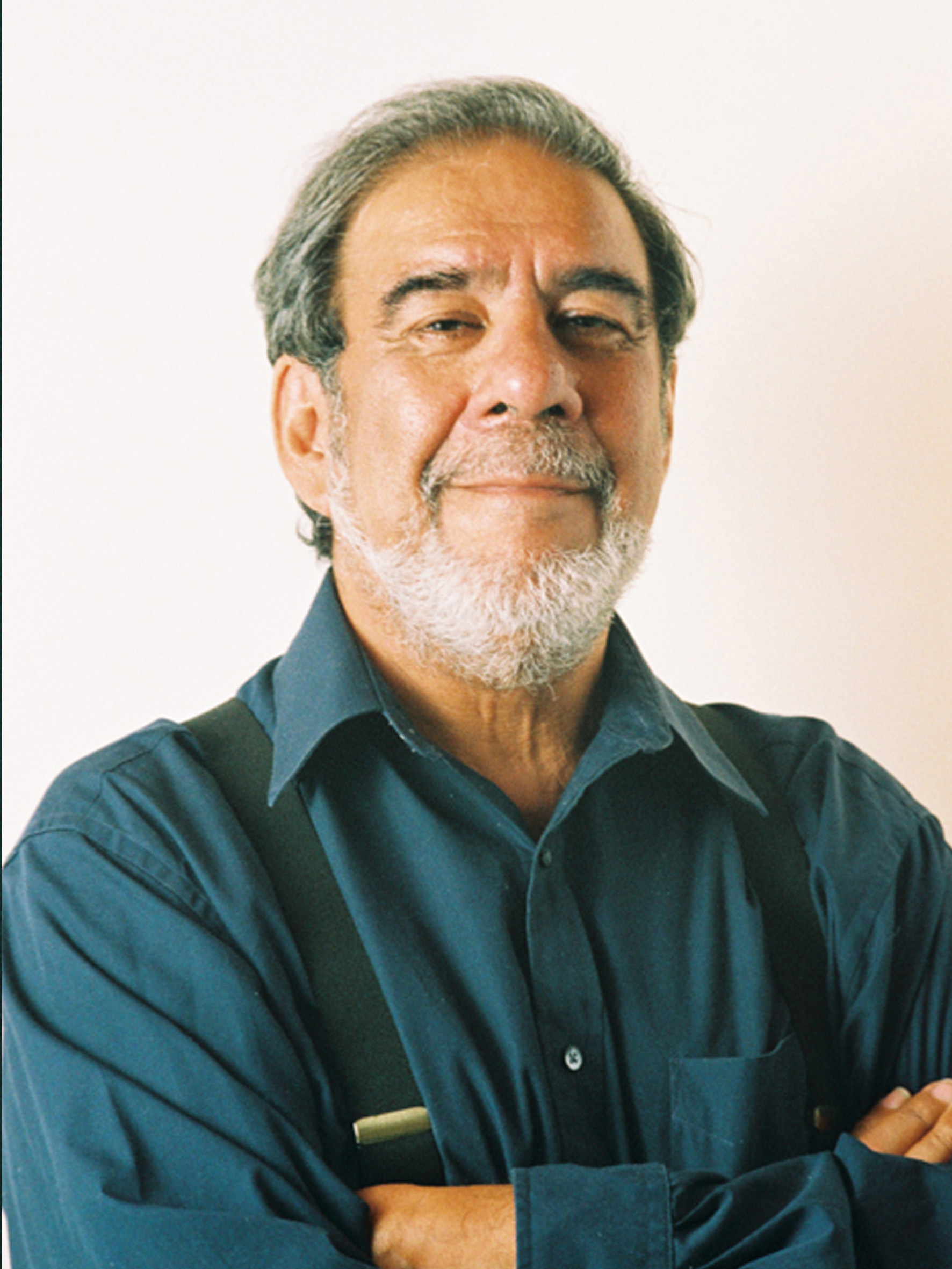
- Juan Bernal Ponce in 2004
- Born: July 17, 1938; Valparaíso, Chile
- Died: January 19, 2006 (aged 67); San José, Costa Rica
- Education: University of Chile
- Occupations: Architect; Painter

Juan Bernal Ponce (17 July 1938 in Valparaíso, Chile – 19 January 2006 in San José, Costa Rica) was a Chilean architect, artist, and university professor who spent half of his life in Costa Rica.

== Early life ==
He left in 1974 after a brief stay in Colombia, following the fall of Salvador Allende's government. He then lived in Escazú, west of the city of San José, until his passing.

== Career ==
He started his artistic training under the guidance of such Chilean artists as Hans Soyka and Carlos Hermosilla Alvarez. Subsequently, he entered the School of Fine Arts in Viña del Mar in 1954. In 1957, he entered the School of Architecture at the University of Chile, and in 1960, he began studying architecture at the University of Chile in Santiago, graduating in 1965.

In 1962, he traveled to Paris for a year to study printmaking at Atelier 17 under the English master Stanley William Hayter and at the Académie Ranson in Paris, France. Later, he returned to France in 1967 to continue working on his skills as an engraver at the École des Beaux-Arts.

After he left Chile, he received an offer from the then Director of the School of Architecture at the University of Costa Rica (UCR), Felo García, to start teaching at the School of Architecture. He later became a tenured professor at UCR. Over the years, he taught university courses at the School of Architecture of the University of Costa Rica, such as "Cities and History," "Engraving," and "Fundamentals of Design I and II." He contributed to the university periodical Semana U. He also served as an art critic correspondent for Costa Rica's largest circulation newspaper, La Nación.

Between 1986 and 1987, he studied at The Mission Graphic Center in San Francisco, USA. He was also an invited lecturer in Architecture at the Technical University of Delft and a Fulbright professor at the University of California, Berkeley, in the United States.
