= Victor Bernal (politician) =

Paraguayan politician

Victor Luís Bernal Garay is a Paraguayan senator for the Colorado Party and the former director of the bi-national hydroelectric enterprise Itaipú Binacional. He is an accountant by profession. An official investigation of Bernal's finances began while he was at Itaipú and continued into his years in the Senate. An attempt was made to impeach him, and both he and his wife, María Elizabeth Pleva, spent years engaged in legal battles over charges of embezzlement.

== CEO of Itaipú ==
Bernal was appointed Paraguayan director of Itaipú in September 2003. Itaipú, which is jointly owned by Brazil and Paraguay, describes itself as “the largest power producer in the world” and says that its mission is to “generate quality electricity via socially and environmentally responsible practices, and to foster sustainable economic, tourist, and technological development in Brazil and Paraguay.” Its energy source is the Itaipú Dam, the world's largest hydroelectric dam, which is located on the Paraná River on the border between Brazil and Paraguay. The dam was named one of the seven wonders of the modern world in 1994 by the American Society of Civil Engineers.

During his tenure at Itaipú, under President Nicanor Duarte Frutos, Bernal was one of the most influential figures in Paraguayan politics.

== Bernal relatives employed by Itaipú ==
Bernal's wife, María Elizabeth Pleva, served as assistant Paraguayan director of Itaipú under Bernal, and his brother Oscar was on the staff of Itaipú's Retirement and Pension Fund (Cajubi), a job that, according to the Paraguayan newspaper ABC, Itaipú, involved little or no work. His nephew Luis Benítez Bernal worked in Human Resources at Itaipú; a cousin, José Luis Bernal Sanabria, worked for Itaipú's Tesãi Foundation; another cousin, Nilda Garay Pereira, worked for Itaipú's pension fund (Cajubi), a job that was described by ABC as having “no known functions”; Luis Francisco Pereira Vigo, a nephew of Bernal's first wife, worked as an assistant to Bernal.

As of 2007, Bernal's son Hugo, who was in his twenties, was reportedly earning a high salary as an adviser at the U.S. Embassy in Paraguay, even though he was not a career diplomat, which is ordinarily a requirement for such positions.

The financial investments that Cajubi made in Canada, known as "the robbery of the century", were made between 2005 and 2008 when Nicanor Duarte Frutos was President of Paraguay and Victor Bernal was director of Itaipú.

In January 2025, Judge Celia Salinas issued a final ruling awarding civil damages against the former directors of the Itaipu pension fund, Cajubi. Cajubi's lawyer, Rafael Fernández, told the media that Bernal was not investigated, supposedly "due to the complicit silence of the convicted former directors."

== Salary ==
During his time at Itaipú, Bernal earned a total of G 4,004,670,277 in salary, and his wife earned G 1,596,560,135. They also made G 1,000,000,000 from selling property.

== Controversial lifestyle ==
Beginning on 9 September 2007, ABC ran a series of articles about the Bernal family. The first article, headlined “Pornographic display of wealth by Victor Bernal and his family,” began by listing several examples to illustrate the Bernal family's opulent lifestyle.

In the concluding article in the series, the "new 'royalty'" was said to have replaced the "old 'barons'". It was noted that Pleva enjoyed a “title and salary at Itaipú, plus a vehicle, driver, fuel, and bodyguards.”

In an October 2007 article about Bernal's acquisition of wealth and land, it was noted that his property and money were the result of "miraculous multiplication". On just two properties, Bernal had spent G 1,300 million, almost twice his annual salary of G 720 million.

== Resignation ==
Bernal resigned from Itaipú in January 2008 to run for the Paraguayan senate, and was paid G 303,266,890 by Itaipú in compensation for his period of service. On 17 January, President Nicanor Duarte announced that Ramón Romero Roa would replace Bernal.

== Senator ==
In the Paraguayan general election on 20 April 2008, Bernal was elected to the Senate.

=== Committees ===
In the Senate, Bernal has sat on the following permanent committees:

- Hacienda, Presupuesto y Cuentas - 2008-9, 2009–10, 2010–11, 2011–12, 2012–13
- Energía, Recursos Naturales, Población, Ambiente, Producción y Desarrollo Sostenible - 2008-9, 2009–10, 2011–12, 2012-13
- Economía, Cooperativismo, Desarrollo e Integración Económica Latinoamericana - 2009-10, 2010–11, 2011–12, 2012-13
- Cuentas y Control de la Administración Financiera del Estado - 2011-12, 2012–13

He has sat on the following bicameral committee:

- C.Bicameral Encargada del Estudio del Presupuesto General de la Nación, Ejercicio Fiscal 2011, Fiscal 2012

== Senatorial activities and related events ==
Bernal denounced the Ministries of Public Health, Agriculture, and Education in May 2012 for using their resources for political purposes.

A large group of young people gathered outside Bernal's home in June 2012 to protest his involvement in the impeachment of President Fernando Lugo.

Bernal called in January 2013 for an end to negotiations between the Paraguayan government and the power company Rio Tinto Alcan, questioning the price the firm was charging for energy.

== Legal difficulties ==
During his tenure as CEO of Itaipú, and also during his subsequent service in the Paraguayan Senate, Bernal has been the subject of several different investigations and prosecutions based on his activities while working at Itaipú. He was investigated for overcharging for public-works projects in the town of Minga Guazú that were paid for by Itaipú; for diverting Itaipú assets to finance campaigns by Colorado Party candidates in 2007 and 2008; for misusing public-works funds; for embezzling; and for using Itaipú-owned assets to purchase equipment for the Tesãi Foundation.

Nicanor Duarte Frutos promoted Blanca Ovelar's candidacy in the 2007 primary elections and the 2008 presidential election, positioning her as his successor.

According to major media outlets and other sources in Paraguay, Blanca Ovelar's campaigns were illicitly financed with money from Itaipu Binacional and its subsidiaries Cajubi and Tesai, with the involvement of Bernal and Nicanor Duarte.

ABC noted on 5 March 2008 that Bernal had bought space in its pages to deny facts that the paper had reported about his use of funds from Itaipú that were supposed to be spent on public-works projects in the town of Minga Guazú in Alto Paraná. Yet Bernal had “not offered a single document in proof” of his claims. By contrast, ABC maintained, the evidence of his guilt was ample. ABC added that “Bernal said yesterday that this daily had cut off contact with him. This is false. For a year, we have sought answers to simple questions about the use of the binational's funds. He has not yet granted an interview. Or responded to our questionnaires.”

Prosecutor Sergio Alegre of the Attorney General's Office asked Judge Ruben Ayala Brun on 16 April 2008 to dismiss an embezzlement complaint filed against Bernal by public advocate Edgar Villalba and by Gerardo Rolón Pose and Nils Candia Gini, presidents of the Democratic and Revolutionary Febrerista parties, respectively. The prosecutor requested the dismissal because a study of Bernal's and his wife's finances indicated that their joint legal income over a period of years had exceeded their expenditures, a finding which, if confirmed, would leave Ayala Brun with no choice other than to dismiss the charges. Ayala Brun asked the Attorney General to ratify or rectify the opinion, whereupon deputy prosecutor Carlos Arregui, head of the Economic Crime and Anti-Corruption Unit, intervened, arguing that there were points that had to be investigated before the complaint could be dismissed or a criminal case opened. It was reported on 24 April 2008 that the Attorney General had ten working days, beginning on 23 April, to respond to the prosecutor's request to dismiss the case.

The Prosecutors' Office was accused of making an “undisguised attempt to launder the new Colorado Senator Victor Bernal,” as demonstrated by the unusual speed with which Alegre had upheld the embezzlement complaint dismissal against Bernal. Noting that Alegre had ignored evidence that ABC itself had supplied in earlier articles, Reinfeldt described the prosecution as “one of the poorest” Alegre had ever carried out, and noted that the judge had “bounced” Alegre twice “in a desperate attempt to secure a better investigation....Through negligence or ignorance, or deliberately, Alegre has ignored fundamental principles that are employed in the judiciary to carry out a proper investigation of embezzlement that encompasses everyone in the closest ring surrounding Bernal.”

Alegre was informed on 8 May 2008 by Arregui that the latter would continue to pursue a prosecution of Bernal for embezzlement during his tenure at Itaipú. On 16 May 2008, Arregui announced that he was opening a criminal investigation into Bernal's use of public-works funds, and said that he had jurisdiction to investigate acts by Itaipú in Paraguay.

Luis Alberto Franco wrote a letter to Alegre in June 2008 denying charges that he was a front man for Bernal.

A September 2008 overview of government corruption in Paraguay mentioned Bernal as a “man of humble origin” who in slightly over five years had become “an owner of mansions and ranches” and joined the list of Paraguay's leading billionaires, and who now, as a recently elected Senator, enjoyed “parliamentary immunity.”

It was reported on 2 September 2008 that Bernal, while CEO of Itaipú, had violated its internal controls by personally authorizing millions in disbursements without any verification. After an audit by Ramón Romero Roa, also a former Itaipú director, Bernal was investigated for diverting more than G 34 billion from Itaipú to the Tesâi Foundation.

Itaipú's Paraguayan director, Carlos Mateo Balmelli, accused Bernal and Ramon Roa, another former Itaipú director, on 21 October 2008, of embezzling about 34 billion Gs. Mateo said that Itaipú's lawyers had requested the impeachment of Bernal in order to “facilitate the investigation.” On the same date Mateo made public a report on the Tesãi Foundation, which, according to an external audit, had been used to drain funds from Itaipú.

It was reported on 4 November 2008, that four companies apparently hired by Itaipú during Bernal's tenure to do campaign work for the Colorado Party had billed Itaipú a total of over G 22 billion (U.S. $4.7 million). The firms were operated under the direction of Alejandro (Sasha) Evreinoff, brother-in-law of Wilfrido Taboada, Itaipú's CFO and Bernal's right-hand man.

In late November 2008, lawyers for Bernal, appearing before the Criminal Chamber of the Supreme Court, appealed the decision of State Attorney General Ruben Candia Amarilla to appoint Rocio Vallejo to investigate illegal political funding during Bernal's tenure at Itaipú. Meanwhile, Arregui ordered Acuña to continue looking into the alleged campaign funding.

Judge Patricia González was appointed in December 2008 to adjudicate a case brought against Bernal by prosecutor Gustavo Gamba, who accused him of squandering funds intended to be transferred from Itaipú to Minga Guazú for public-works projects. On 10 December, Bernal was charged with breach of trust for his leadership of Itaipú. On 11 December González said that she would seek Bernal's impeachment. On 18 December, González sent a message to the Paraguayan Congress ordering that Bernal be impeached by the Senate for breach of trust. On 19 December Gonzalez approved Bernal's application for parliamentary immunity, while Gamba insisted that impeachment proceedings against Bernal go forward.

The Paraguayan Court of Appeals decided on 10 February 2009 to take on the case against Bernal in the matter of the Minga Guazú funds.

Acuña refused on 19 February 2009 to dismiss a complaint that Bernal, in 2006, while a director of Itaipú, had ordered the purchase for $450,000 of an MRI scanner that became unusable after a brief period. The charge was part of the case involving the Tesãi Foundation.

As of May 2009, the charges against Bernal relating to the use of Itaipú funds to pay Colorado Party campaign expenses were being officially investigated by Evreinoff.

Prosecutors taped Bernal on 3 June 2009 delivering an initial payment of $90,000 to Gamba in return for Gamba's promise to dismiss one of five cases pending against Bernal involving his reported misuse of funds while director of the Itaipú. On 8 June 2009, it was reported that Gamba would be prosecuted on charges of seeking a bribe from Bernal. Allegedly, Gamba, acting through lawyer Juan Portillo, had demanded a payout of $150,000, with a first payment of $90,000, in exchange for dropping the case against Bernal. Bernal reported Gamba to the authorities, and the prosecutor was secretly filmed accepting money.

The head of Itaipú, Carlos Mateo Balmelli, told Radio Primero de Marzo in June 2009 that Bernal had spent five million dollars on social events during his tenure at Itaipú and that he, Mateo, would be filing charges against Bernal with Attorney General Amarilla.

It was reported on 9 July 2009 that Gamba had been replaced as prosecutor on the Minga Guazú case by Eduardo Cazenave, who was planning to travel to Alto Paraná to investigate the disappearance of G. 380,418,219 in funds designated for Minga Guazú. The same article reported that the proceedings against Bernal were stalled in the Supreme Court.

The Criminal Chamber of the Paraguayan Supreme Court, ruling in favor of a motion by Bernal, removed Arregui and fellow prosecutors Rocio Vallejo and Arnaldo Giuzzio on 15 July 2009 from the case against Bernal on which they had been working.

It was reported on 23 June 2009 that the director of Itaipú had requested that investigations of Bernal being carried out by the Economic Crimes and Corruption Unit be transferred to the public prosecutor's office, but Amarilla expressed support for the unit and ordered that the investigations remain in its hands.

Prosecutor Victoria Acuña of the Economic Crimes Unit announced on 30 July 2009 that she was investigating the alleged use of Itaipú funds during Bernal's tenure to pay campaign expenses incurred by the Colorado Party in the 2008 general elections.

Prosecutors accused Gamba on 4 December 2009 of soliciting a $150,000 bribe from Bernal. Gamba was suspended from his position, while Bernal's senatorial position was protected by political immunity.

ABC ran an article early in 2010 claiming that the legal process against Bernal had been stalled because of “chicanery.”

An ABC article on 24 May 2010 summed up Bernal's complex legal situation as of that date. Alegre was investigating embezzlement charges; Acuña was investigating the use of public-works funds to pay the Colorado Party's campaign expenses in the 2008 general election; Cazenave was investigating accusations of overcharging in the matter of Minga Guazú; and Silvia Cabrera was investigating the abuse of Itaipú funds via the Tesãi Foundation. Alegre had tried to “launder” Bernal by “archiving” charges against him, but this had been blocked by Judge Ruben Ayala Brun, with Arregui insisting on the need for further investigation. “It is not easy to pursue investigations against the 'big boys,'” ABC observed, noting that Roberto Melgarejo, husband of Judge Gonzalez, who was in charge of the Minga Guazú case, is a friend of Bernal, “and there is talk that they would be negotiating to 'launder'” him. Meanwhile, Bernal's “request for immunity remains frozen in the judiciary.”

It was announced in February 2011 that Bernal would not be tried for irregularly appropriating funds designated for public-service outlays in Minga Guazú. District Attorney Victoria Acuña indicted a former CFO of Itaipú and two other Itaipú officials, however, for using these funds to pay campaign expenses for Bernal and others.

Bernal met with Arregui and Alegre on 17 March 2011 to discuss their separate investigations of him. An ABC report noted that these meetings between Bernal and the investigators had become common. Meanwhile, Victoria Acuña, Eduardo Cazenave, and Humberto Otazú were investigating other charges against him. Also, Silvia Cabrera was looking into charges of embezzlement relating to the Tesãi Foundation that had been raised by Carlos Mateo Balmelli. In reply to Balmelli's charges, Bernal called him a liar and a “scoundrel”.

It was reported on 4 September 2011 that Acuña had decided to officially charge Wilfrido Taboada, Rulfo Velilla Aguilera, and Guido Roque Zacarías Michelagnoli with using Itaipú funds to pay Colorado Party campaign expenses. She did not charge Bernal, even though he was CEO of Itaipú at the time and his senatorial campaign was one of those that most benefited from the alleged diversion of funds.

After an investigation of the finances of Bernal and his family that lasted from 2001 to 2011, it was reported in February 2012 that the embezzlement case against Bernal and Pleva was close to being dismissed because the prosecution's expert, Graciela Alvarez, had not found anything incriminating. In April 2012, it was reported that Álvarez and defense expert Víctor González had both rendered opinions in Bernal's favor, although some questions remained, especially in regard to Bernal's alleged front men, including Juan Ángel Chávez, Cristóbal Chávez, Félix Benítez Molas, Luis Alberto López Zayas, and Óscar René Cabrera Rodríguez, plus Luis Pereira Vigo and Fernando José Vera Vigo, the latter two being nephews of Bernal's ex-wife, Natividad Mercedes Lugo. The questions surrounded, among other things, the formation of a company called SOL 25 and the purchase of a large property in Villeta known as Potrero Guyratî for a suspiciously low price.

It was reported on 30 May 2012 that Alegre would not be charging Bernal and Pleva with embezzlement, given that their reported income exceeded their reported expenditures. In June 2012, Judge Rubén Ayala Brun upheld Alegre's request to dismiss the case brought by Gerardo Rolón Posse and Nils Candia against Bernal and his wife on charges of embezzlement. The judge noted, however, that the cases against alleged front men Ricardo Giménez Benítez, Luis Pereira Vigo y Jorge Pereira Vigo, Fernando José Vera, Juan Ángel Chávez, Alberto Franco Maciel, Óscar Cabrera Rodríguez, Luis Alberto López, and Félix Benítez Molas, and against Natividad Mercedes Lugo, remained “on standby.”

It was reported on 2 October 2012 that Judge Miguel Tadeo Fernandez had ordered Acuña to spend another year investigating the alleged use under Bernal's tenure at Itaipú of public-works funds to pay campaign expenses incurred in 2008 by the Colorado Party.

On 15 October 2012, it was reported that Gamba and Portillo had been officially charged with receiving a bribe from Bernal.

On 16 October Acuña asked for a dismissal of a case against Bernal's Itaipú associates Wilfrido Taboada Molinas, Rulfo René Velilla Aguilera, and Guido Roque Zacarías Michelagnoli, saying that the evidence that Itaipú funds had been used to pay Colorado Party campaign expenses was inconclusive. On 11 November, however, ABC stated that the evidence, to which the newspaper had access, proved that Itaipú funds had been spent on the party's 2008 campaign.

It was again reported on 2 November 2012 that Bernal would not be prosecuted for alleged misuse of the Minga Guazú funds.

On 12 November it was reported that the Ministry of Health had not signed any agreement with Itaipú to combat dengue, thereby supporting charges that more than G. 1,100 million in Itaipú funds purportedly spent on an anti-dengue campaign had in fact been spent on the Colorado Party's 2008 election campaign. Later in November, Acuña asked Judge Tadeo Fernandez to dismiss the charges that Itaipú funds had been used to pay campaign expenses. On 29 December it was reported that Tadeo Fernandez had finally dismissed the charges against Rulfo René Velilla Aguilera, Guido Guillermo Roque Zacarías Michelagnoli, and Wilfrido Emigdio Taboada.

Between 2010 and 2018, investigations into investments in the Itaipu Retirement and Pension Fund (Cajubi) were led by several prosecutors: Sergio Alegre, Liliana Alcaraz, Victoria Acuña, and René Fernández.

The commissions on Cajubi's investments were received by Paraguayan resident Ronald Timcke in Swiss accounts at Clariden Leu, according to the Public Ministry file No. 137/2014, dated October 2014, for money laundering.

Ronald Timcke's mother-in-law, Myriam Peña Candia, was Chief Judge of the Supreme Court of Justice of Paraguay from 2015 to 2020, appointed by Paraguay's President, Horacio Cartes.

Several years earlier, then-prosecutor Rocío Vallejo (elected to Congress in 2018) had already brought charges against Ronald Timcke and others for bribery in connection with the municipal employees' pension fund in Paraguay. That criminal trial concluded in May 2010.

== Recommended for return to Itaipú ==
Senator Juan Carlos “Calé” Galaverna of the Colorado Party recommended to the party's presidential candidate, Horacio Cartes, in December 2012 that if he wins the 2013 general election, he should appoint Bernal to the position of Paraguayan director of Itaipú.

== 2019 onwards ==
In November 2019, the director of Itaipu appointed Rulfo Velilla Aguilera as Itaipu's representative to the Board of Directors of Cajubi.

In July 2023, Liliana Alcaraz was appointed by President Santiago Peña as head of the Secretariat for the Prevention of Money Laundering or Assets (Seprelad).

In August 2023, President Peña appointed Víctor Bernal's son, Víctor Bernal Lugo, as director of administration and finance at the Ministry of Public Health, and Víctor Bernal's nephew, Luis Fernando Bernal, as president of the Paraguayan Water and Sanitation Services Company (ESSAP).

In March 2024, President Peña appointed Adriana Jazmín Bernal, Víctor Bernal's daughter, as Superintendent of Insurance at the Central Bank of Paraguay.
