= Pueblos Mágicos =

Mexican tourism initiative to promote various towns throughout the country

Programme logo

The Programa Pueblos Mágicos (Spanish: [pweβloˈmaxiko]; "Magical Towns Programme") is an initiative led by Mexico's Secretariat of Tourism, with support from other federal agencies, to promote a series of towns around the country that offer visitors "cultural richness, historical relevance, cuisine, art crafts, and great hospitality". It is intended to increase tourism to more localities, especially smaller towns in rural areas.

The program promotes visiting small, rural towns, where visitors may see indigenous crafts, landscapes and other attractions. The Government created the 'Pueblos Mágicos' program to recognize places across the country that have certain characteristics and traditions that make them unique, and historically significant, offering "magical" experiences to visitors.

== History ==
The programme was launched in 2001. After nine years and 32 towns having been selected, it was improved and relaunched in 2010. The government added resources to support local efforts and made it a priority under Secretary Guevara. Every town was assigned a budget to continue improving its infrastructure, image, product offering, and experience, while making sure they were maintaining their traditions and their festivals were promoted. By 2012, a total of 83 towns and villages in all 31 states had been awarded the title or nomination of Pueblo Mágico. The program created pride, recognition for its local citizens, and a diversification strategy to promote culture and Mexican traditions.

In late 2018, it was reported that the program would be canceled and would not continue for 2019 due to the lack of support from president Andrés Manuel López Obrador. However, in February 2019, Humberto Hernández, Under-secretary of Development and Tourist Regulation in the Ministry of Tourism, said that the program would continue "more strongly than ever." Under the new decentralized strategy, while the tourism ministry will continue to handle qualification of prospective Pueblos Mágicos, its promotion, and branding of the program, state governors will handle the allocation of government funds to projects in the towns.

A new class of 11 Pueblos Mágicos was inducted into the program on 1 December 2020, bringing the total to 132. This included the reinstatement of Mexcaltitán, one of the original Pueblos Mágicos, after it lost the designation in 2009. As of August 1, 2023, there are 177 Pueblos Mágicos, located in each of the 31 Mexican states.

== Objectives ==
The objectives of this program are:

- To structure a supplementary and diversified touristic supply within the interior of the country for locations that contain important historical and cultural attributes.
- To diversify the country's tourism offerings.
- To create and promote craftsmanship and support traditional festivals.
- To preserve local traditions, culture, ethnic customs and the unique cuisine.
- To create tourist products like adventures, extreme sports, ecotourism, festivals, local itineraries, wine and food activities and sport fishing.
- To reassess, consolidate and reinforce touristic attractions of these towns in the country which represent fresh and different alternatives to meet the rising demand of national and international visitors.
- To create jobs and reduce poverty.
- This program was also developed with the purpose of recognizing the labor of its residents who have kept their cultural and historical riches of their home towns.

== Criteria ==
In order to qualify for the program, towns should have a population of at least 5,000, and be located no more than 300 km, or the equivalent of traveling three hours by land, from a city with a well-resourced market or good connectivity. The town's municipal and state authorities must request incorporation from the Secretariat of Tourism so that assessment visits can be arranged to evaluate the potential of the site. In addition, towns had to meet specific requirements in order to be considered.

The criteria included some of the following:

I. A formally constituted "Pueblo Mágico committee", citizens who represent the pueblo or local community. If the town is accepted into the program, they are responsible for maintaining the designation by working with the local citizens. Their job is to represent the residents of the town and their interests to make sure that the declaration will benefit all and by working together to maximise the opportunities. This group has to be diverse, with no more than 15 people who are willing to contribute their work pro-bono. Group members should rotate periodically.

II. A town council accord, which states an agreement to apply for admittance into the program. The local authorities have to support inclusion in the program, as their support is essential for success. This document affirms the formal support.

III. Agreement of the state congress; state support is needed to assign resources, mainly for infrastructure.

IV. Direct economic contribution towards touristic development in projects, action plans and programs. Each town must try to differentiate from other towns. The plans should relate to the unique features of the town and why it should be considered.

V. An updated municipal touristic development program, with a time frame of at least three years. A long-term plan should be for 3 years to make sure the declaration is maintained, and that the town is working to improve conditions for tourists. The program should be updated every three years.

VI. Rules and local regulations should be updated to have a touristic focus during the current administration of the Municipality. This is to support and protect visitors and people dedicated to tourism activities.

VII. Evidence of the symbolic attraction of the aspiring community, or what makes the town unique.

VIII. Availability of health and public security services for tourists in case of an emergency.

IX. Documentation of private and social investment in touristic development and quality, including hotel rooms, restaurants, tours, museums, activities, etc.

X. Other elements that the committee considers relevant for touristic activity.

== Process ==
- The Pueblo's citizens committee and relevant stakeholders create the file containing all documents, details fulfilling all the requirements, and the request of candidacy to the Secretary of Tourism and the evaluation committee.
- A formal presentation with examples and details is made to the evaluation committee during a scheduled appointment in Mexico City.
- The formal committee has representation from Secretariats of Tourism, Culture, Environment and several other government officials.
- The evaluation committee reviews the file, ensures that all the requirements were met, conducts a physical inspection in the town, and reports back by documenting findings.
- If 100% of the requirements are met then they approve the nomination and turn matters over to the Secretary of Tourism who is responsible to visit the Pueblo, invite the local authorities and local residents, and give the new "nomination" or declaration at the same time that it has to take the oath to the local committee representing the citizens of the town.
- The local citizens and the committee are responsible to maintain the declaration and the town's "magic" standing. Nominations are not permanent, with annual revisions and audits for some towns.
- If an applying pueblo does not meet the requirements, the details are shared back to the committee, and the pueblo will be asked to provide any requested missing information.
- If the Pueblo does not qualify due to inability to meet the required attributes, a formal response is provided to the committee.

Mexico has more than 2,500 municipalities; hundreds apply annually to this program with very few of them being selected. This is a program that provides benefits to local residents who benefit from the resulting economic activity bringing prosperity and various tangible and intangible benefits to their communities.

== List ==
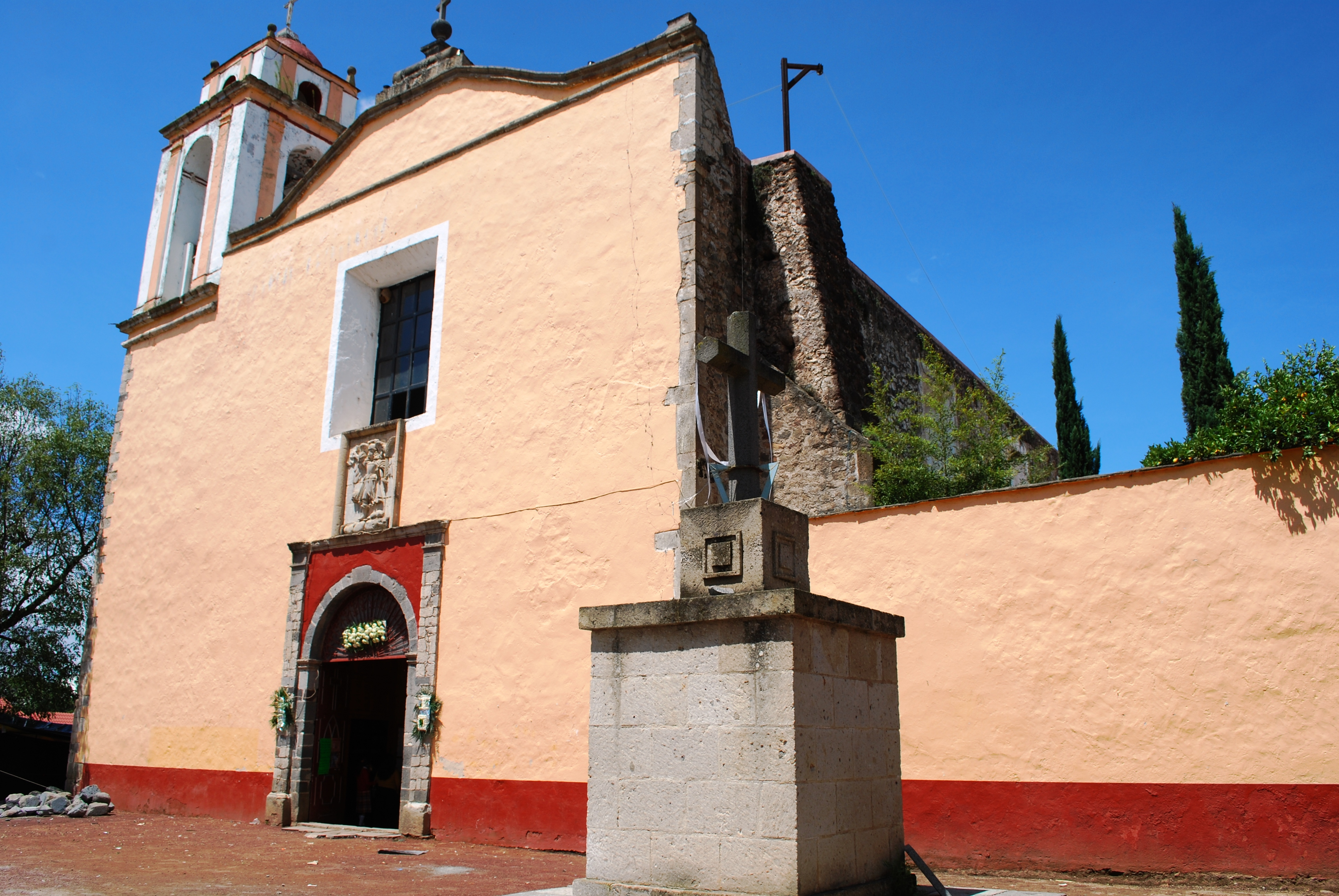
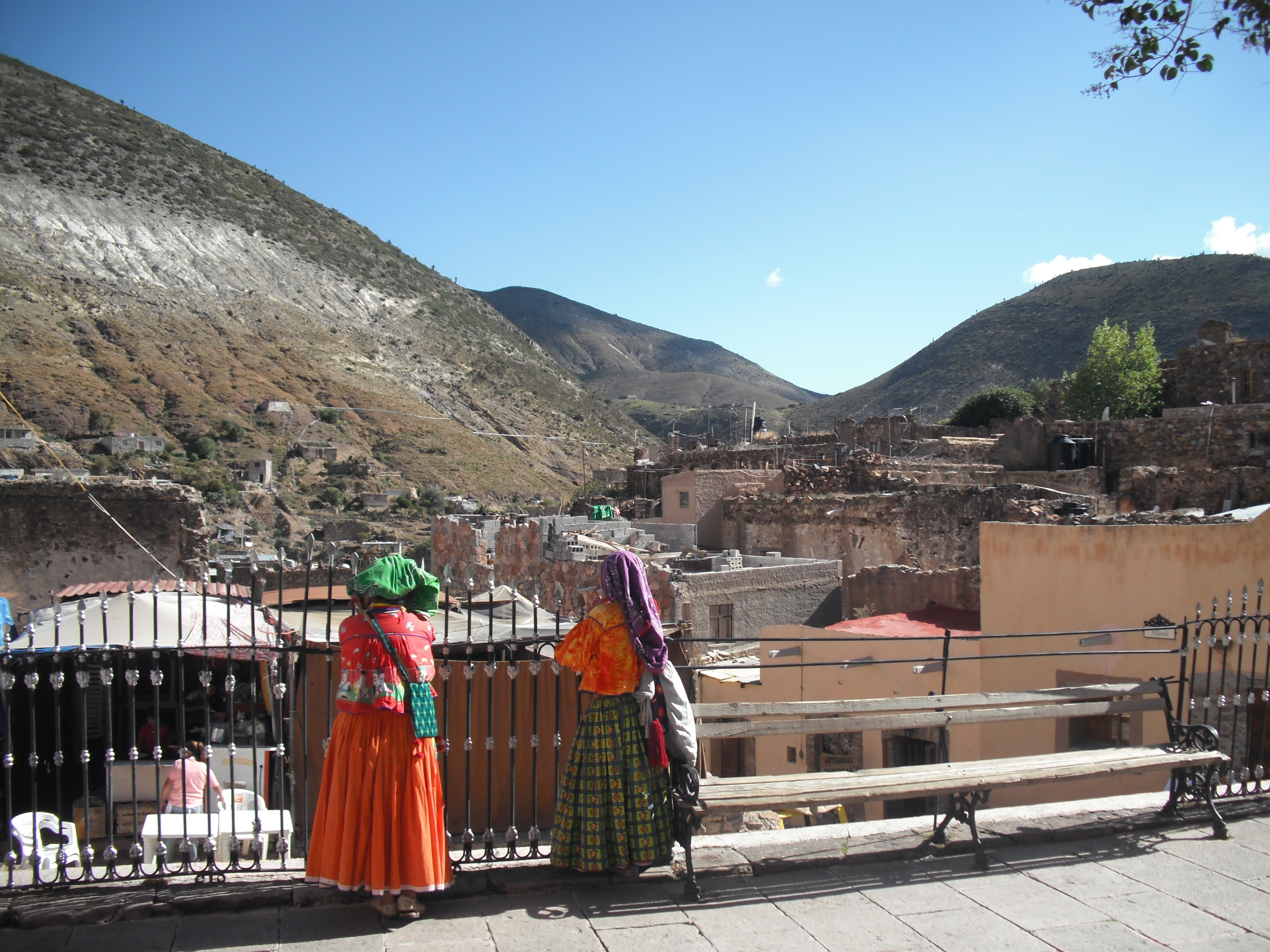
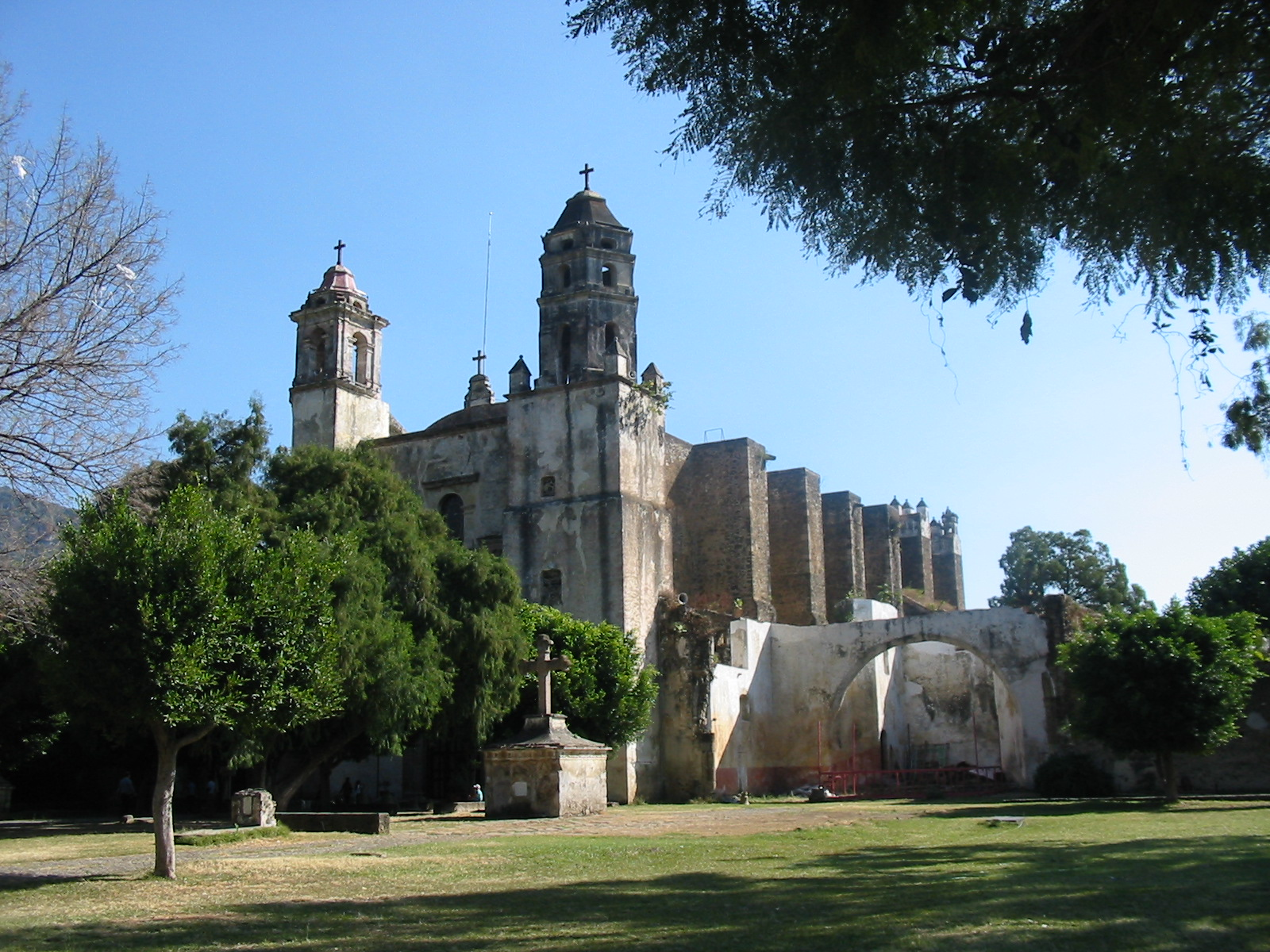
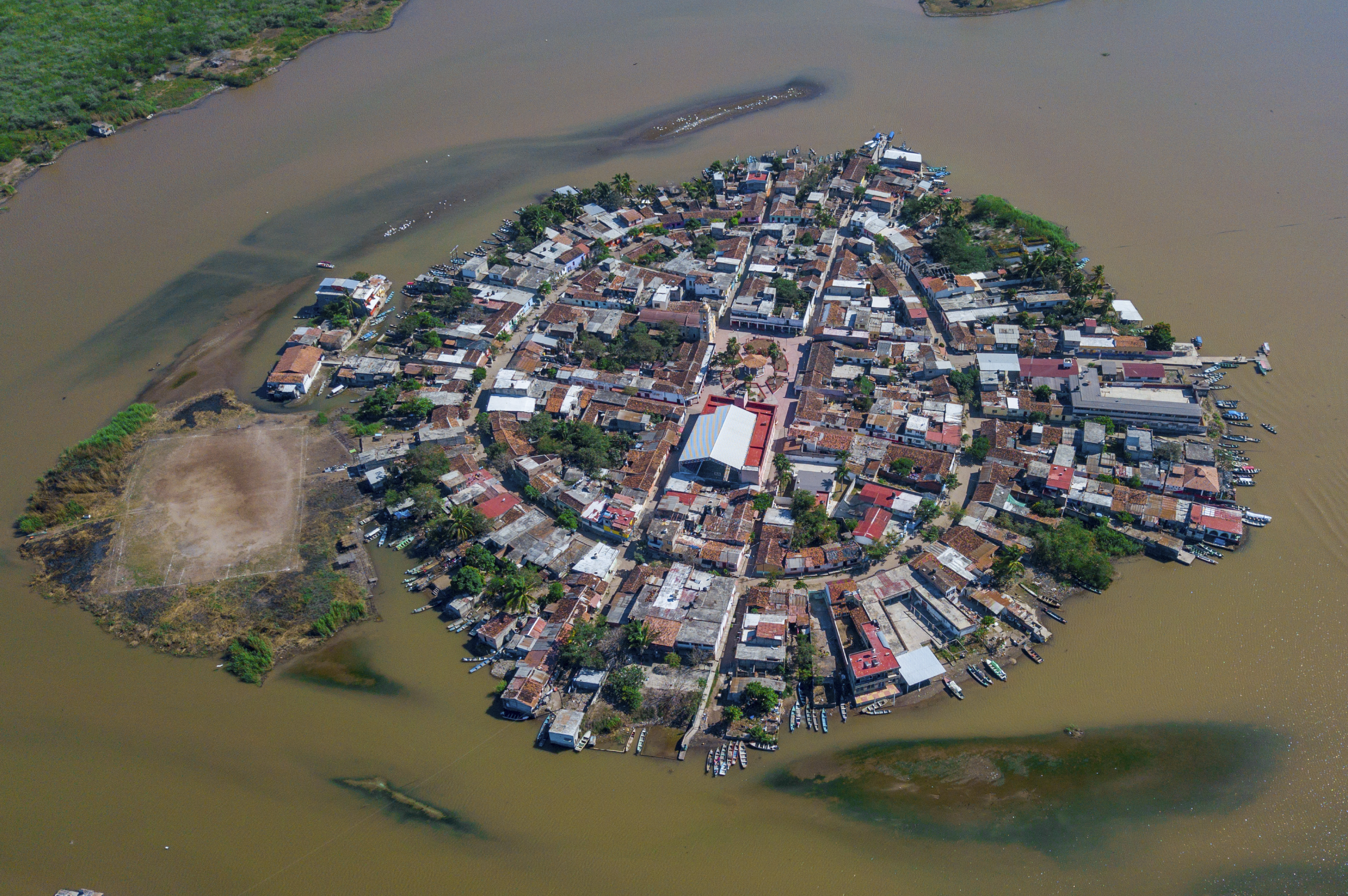
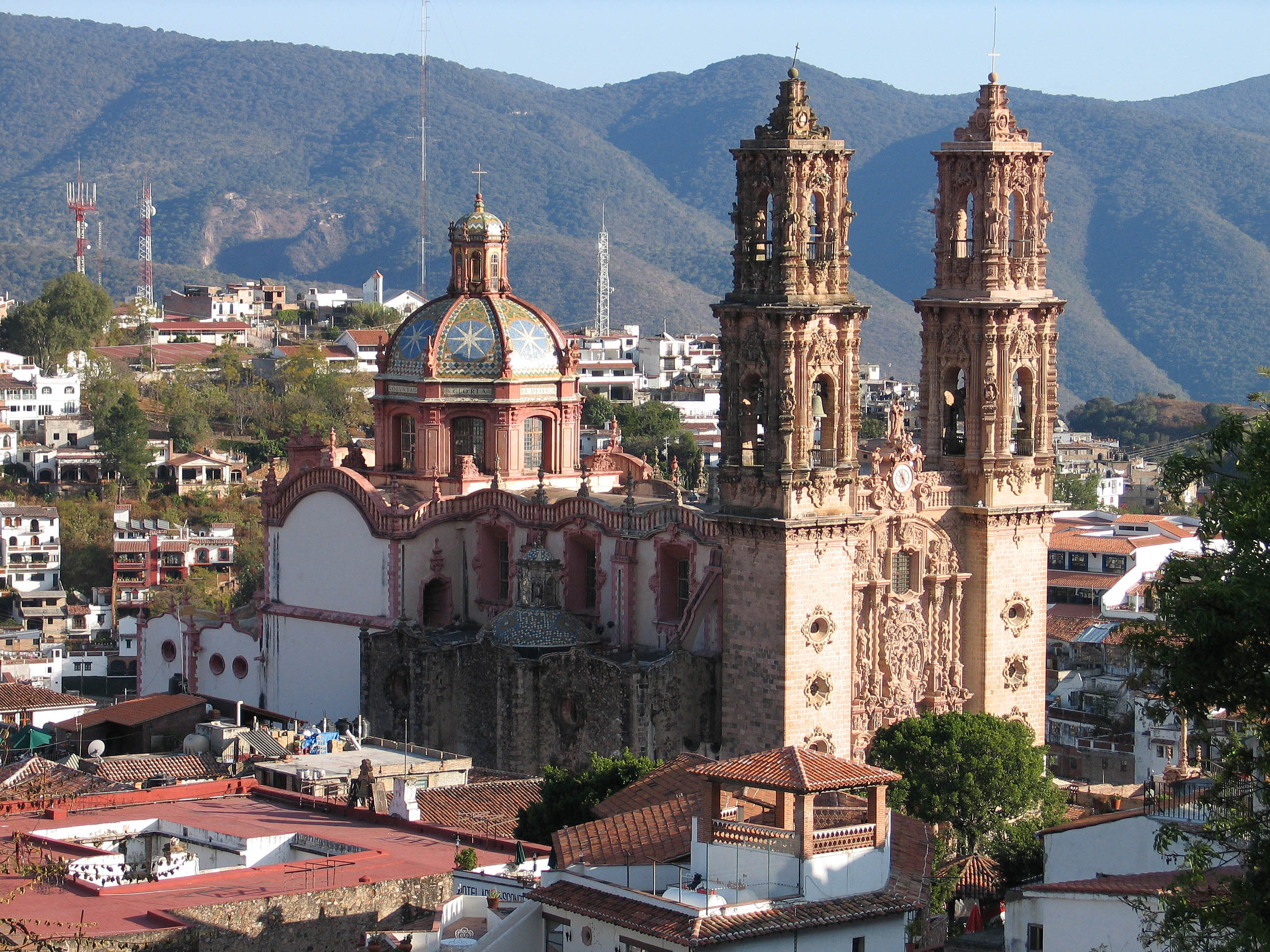
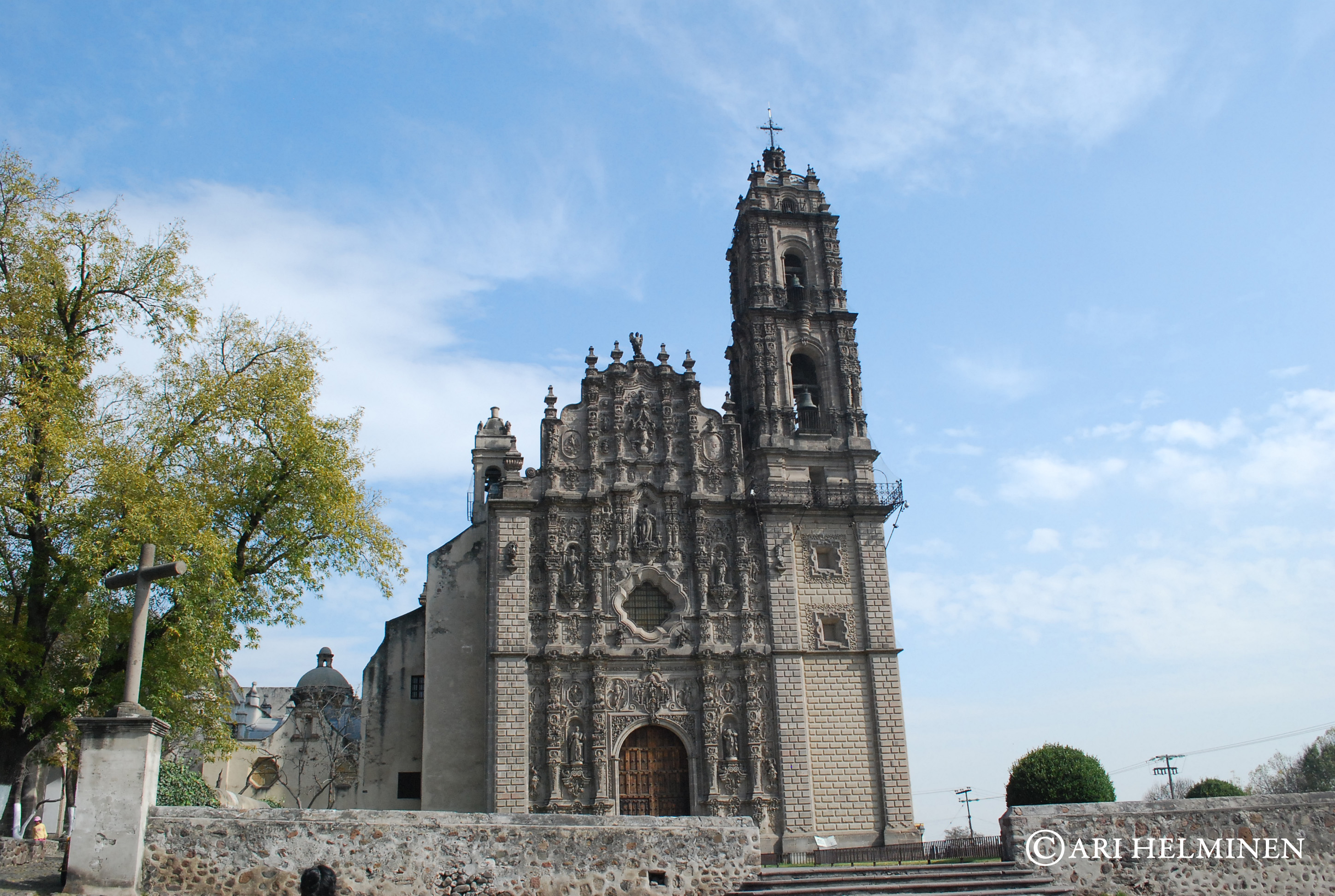
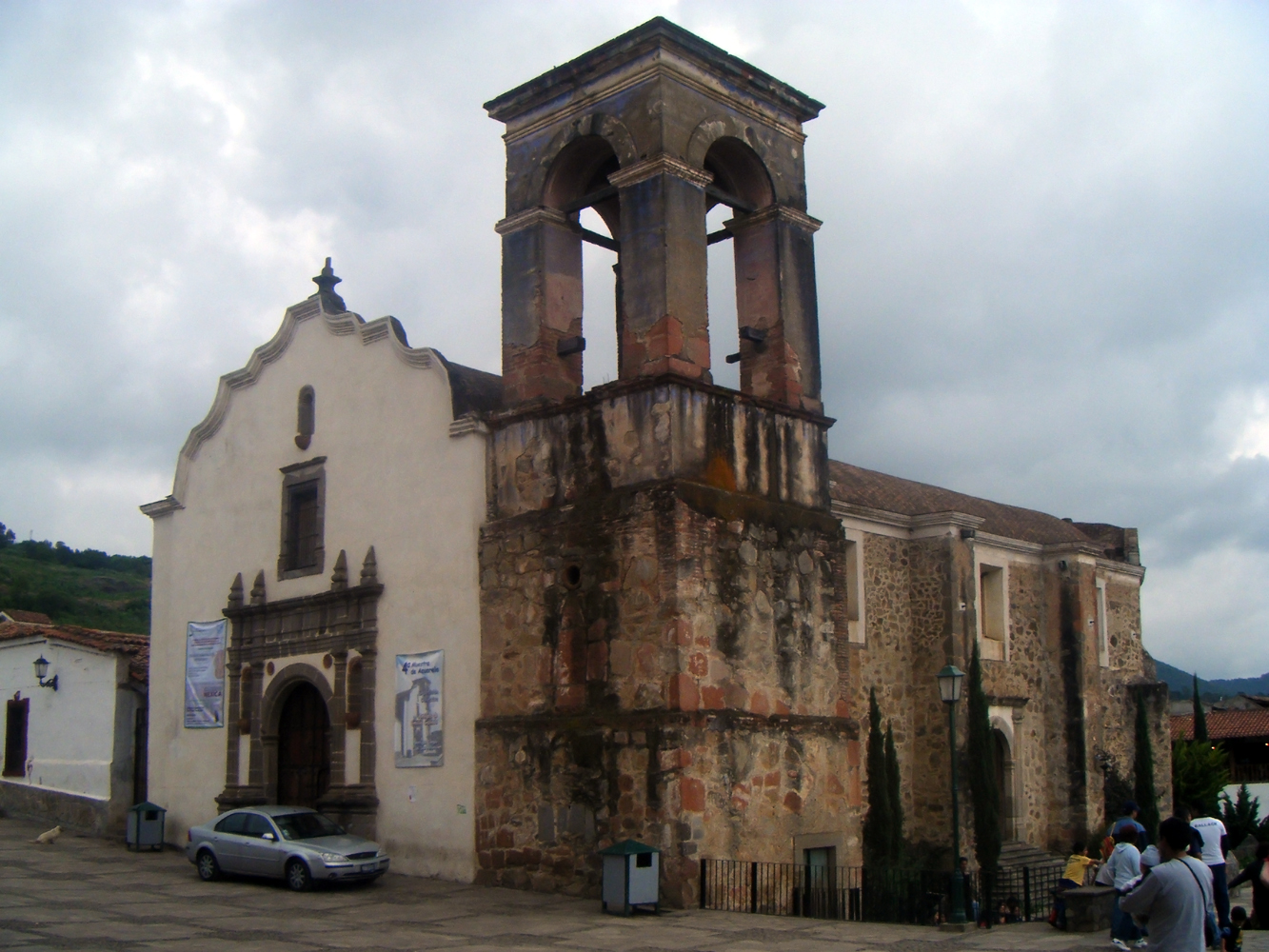
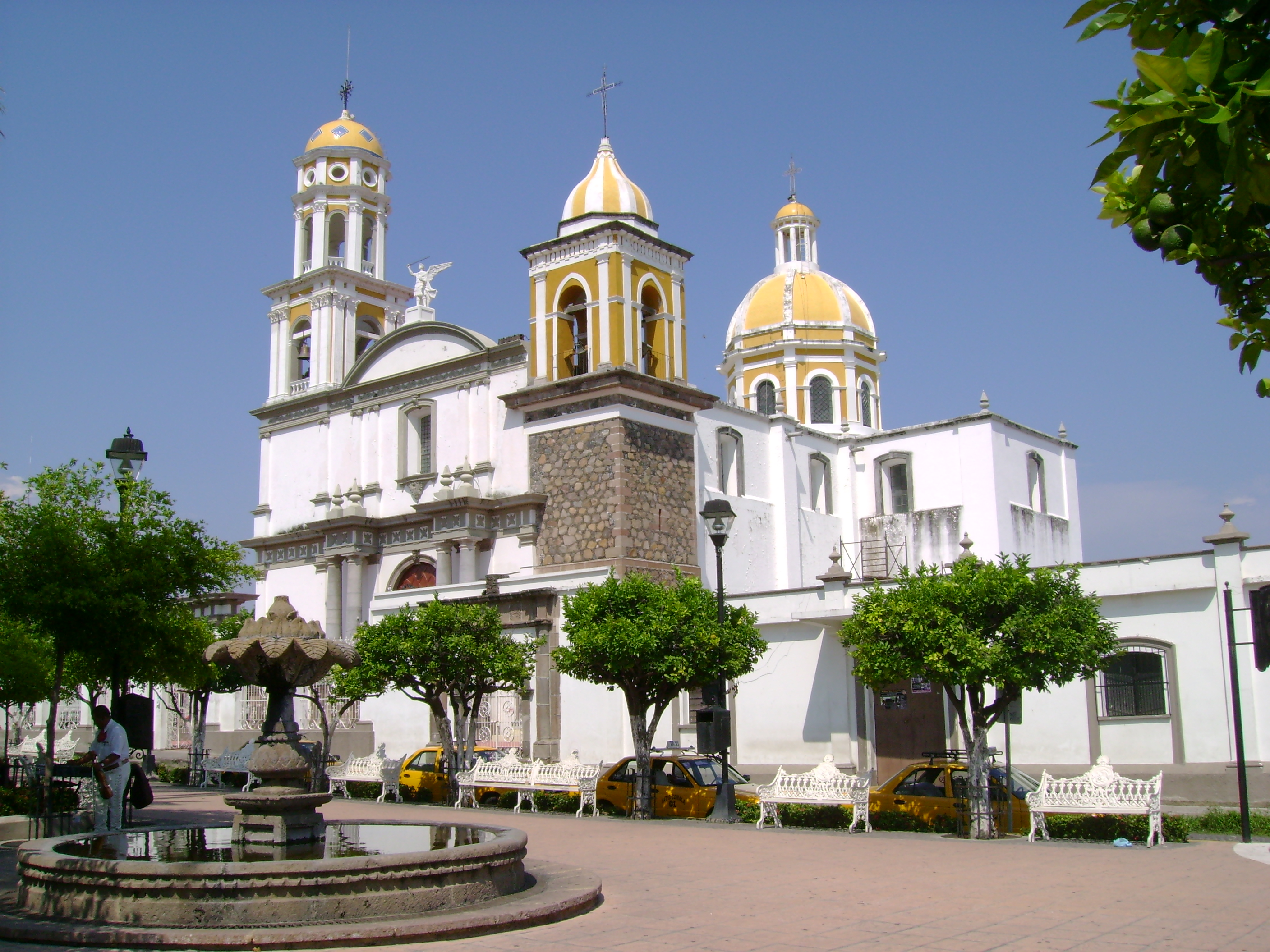
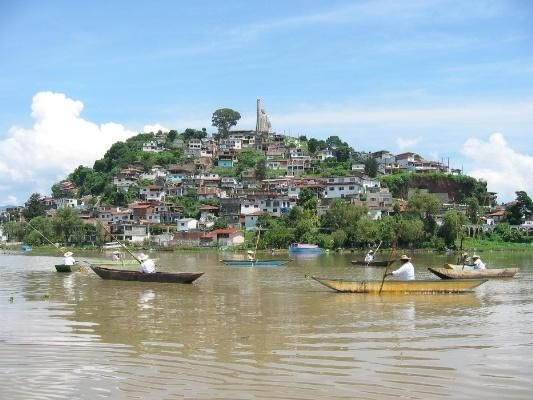
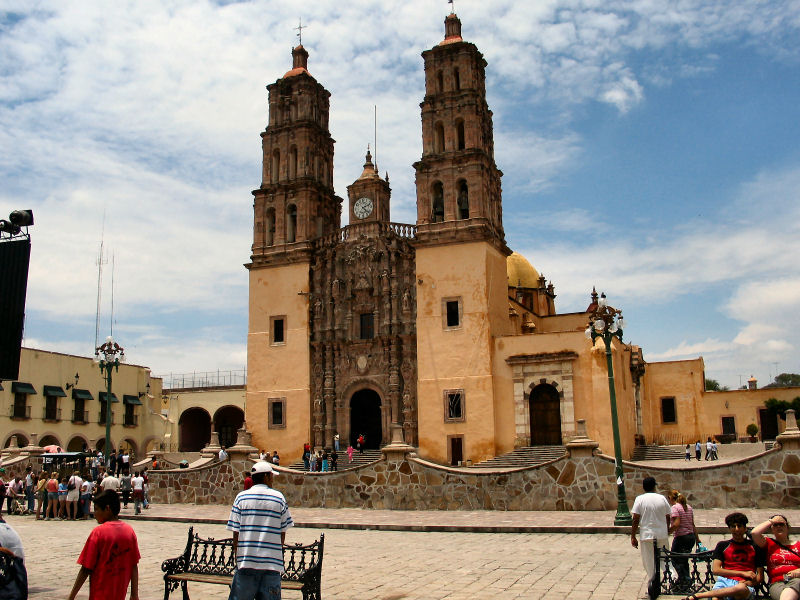
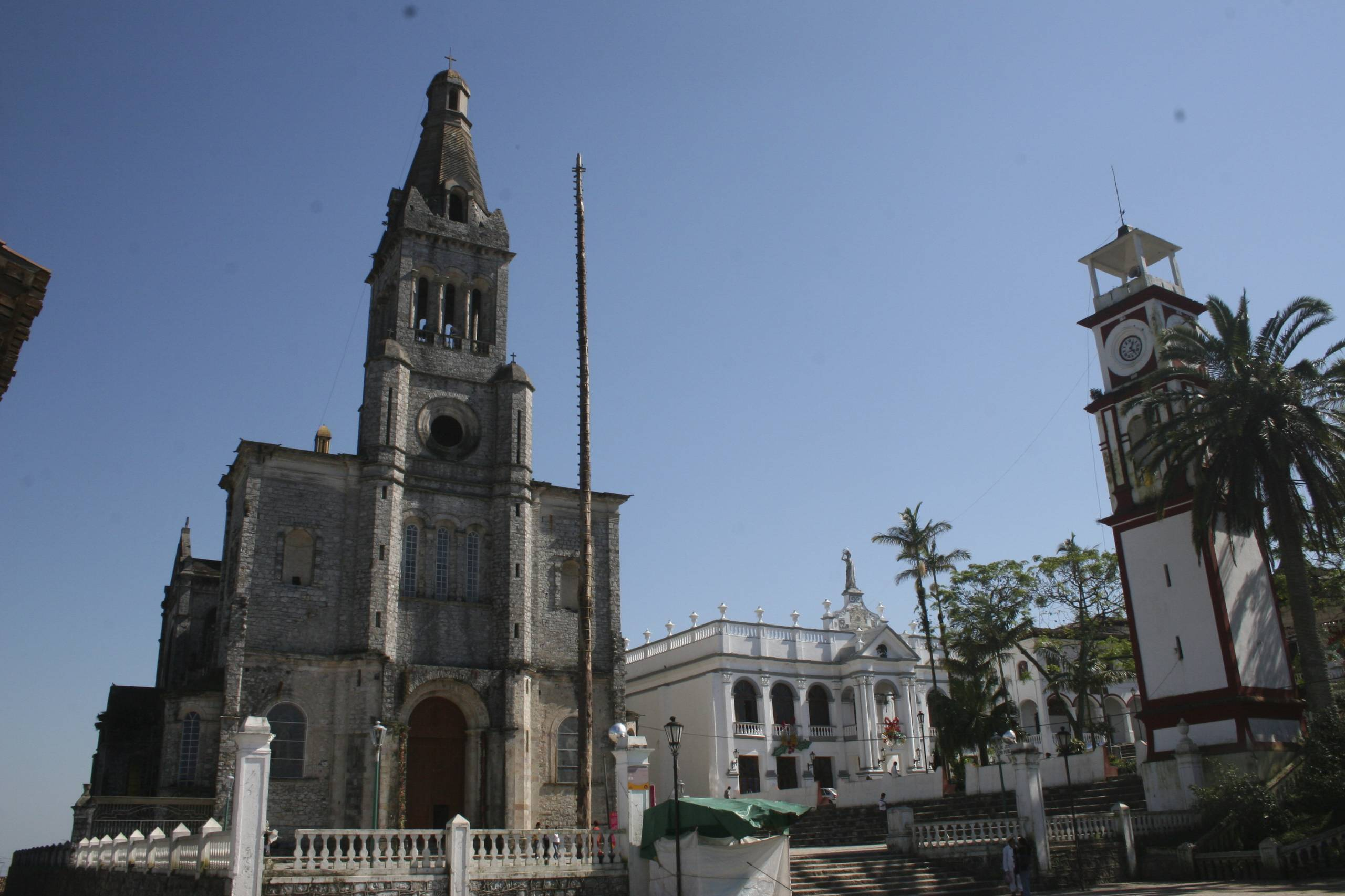
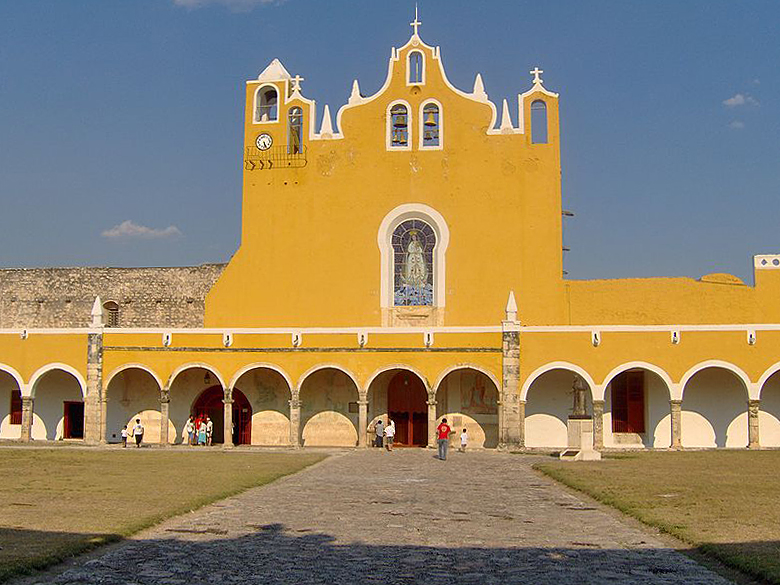
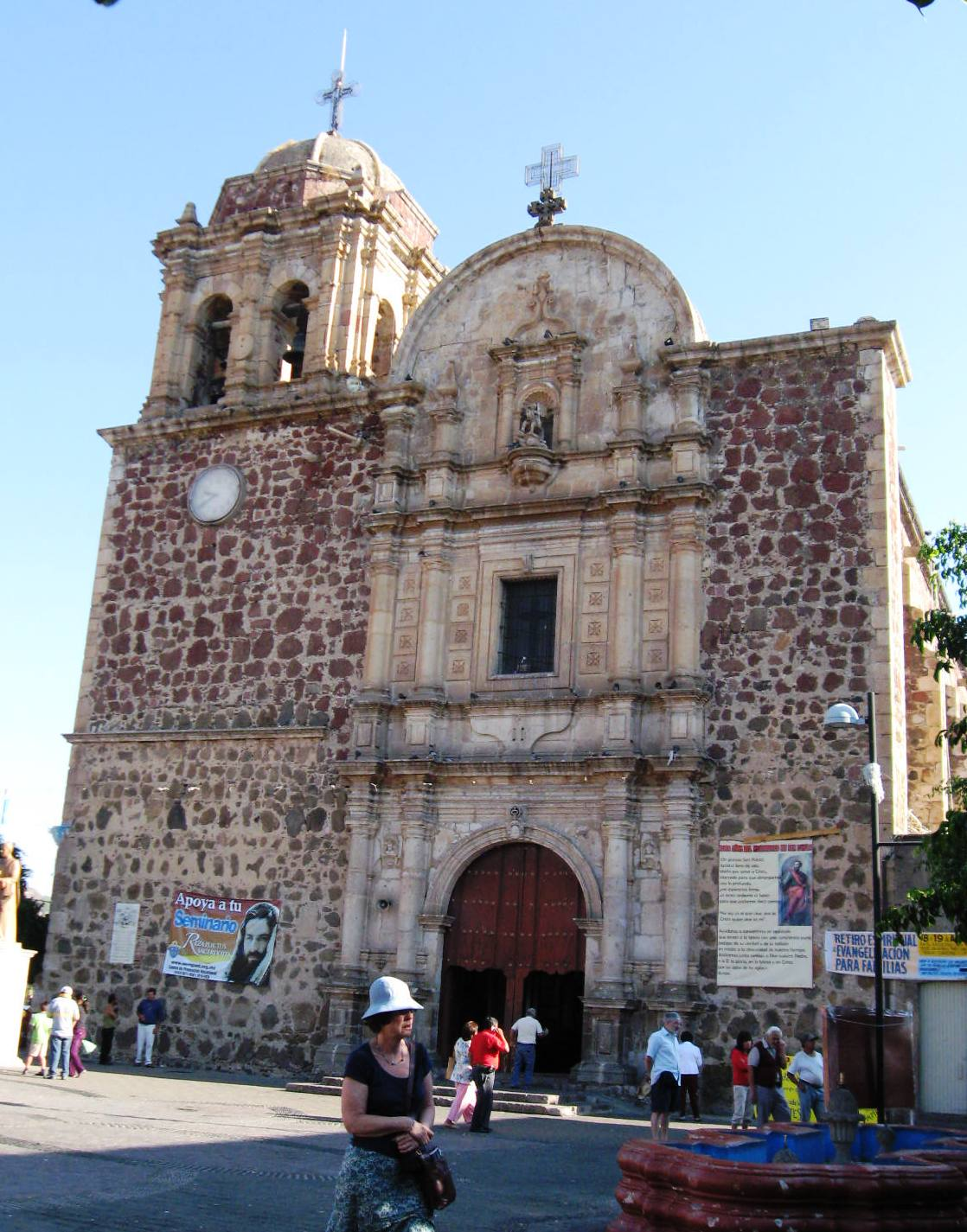
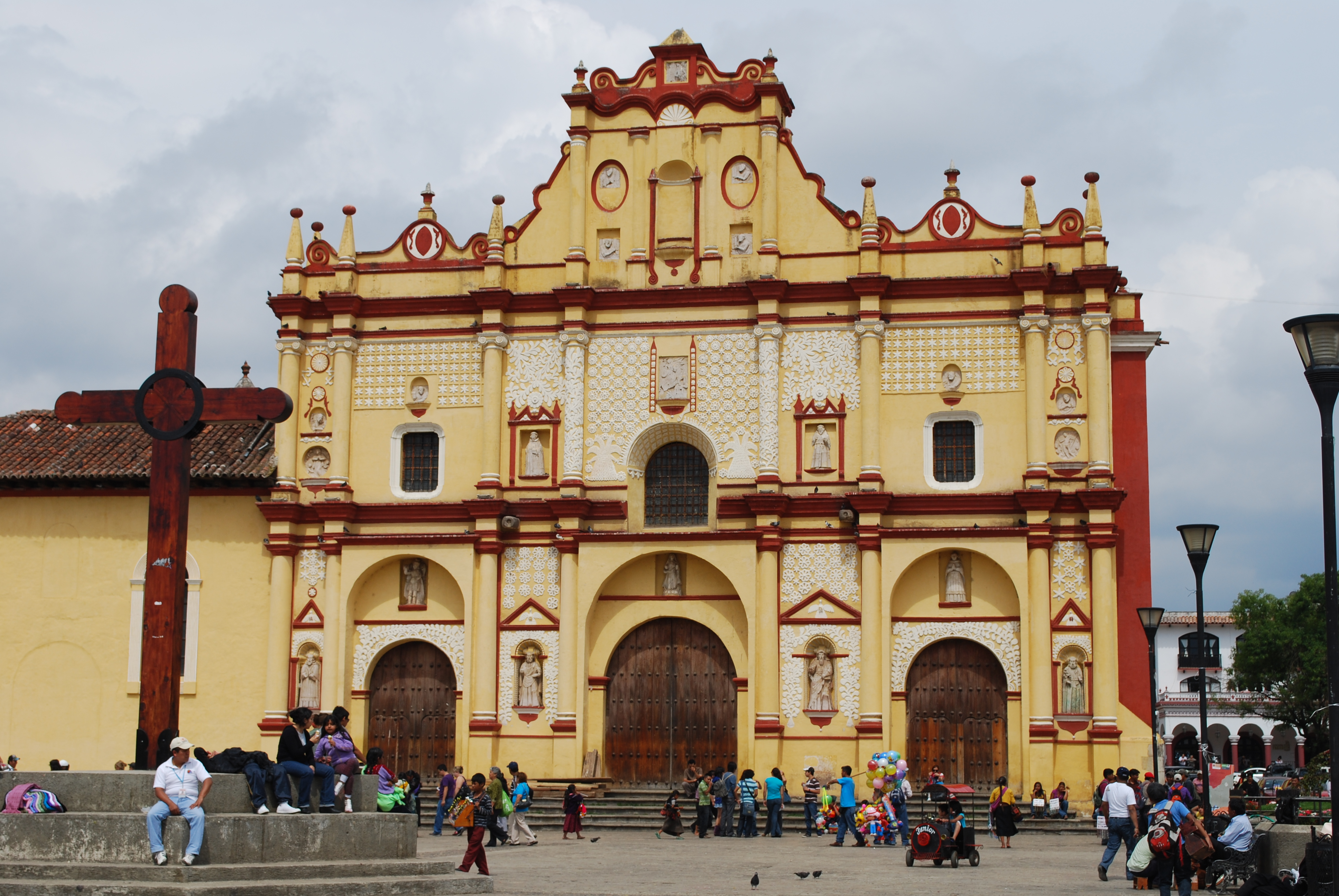
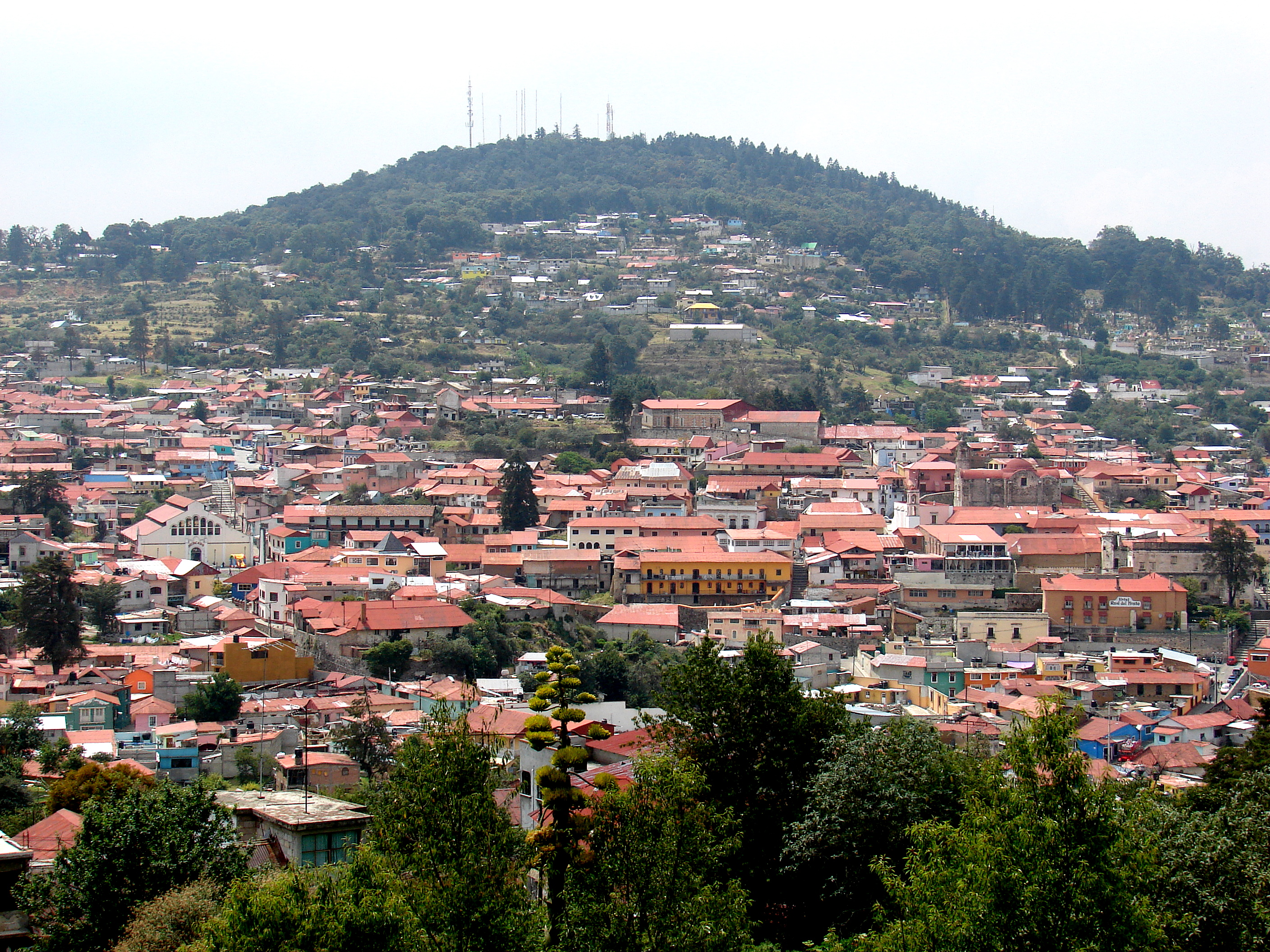
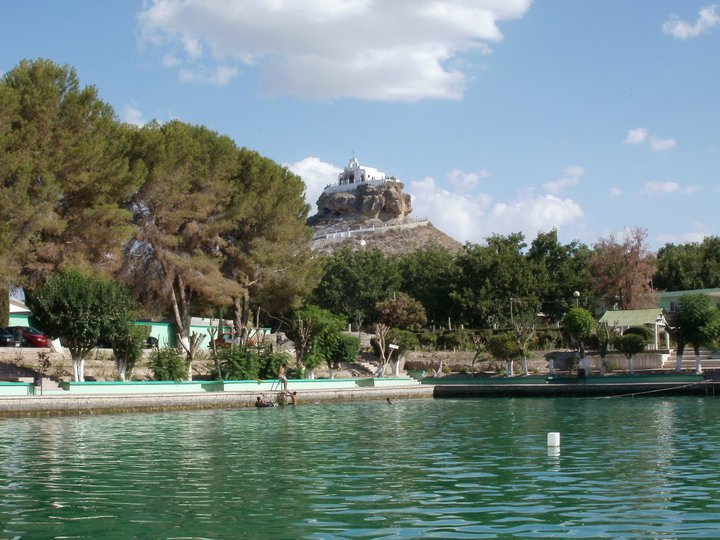
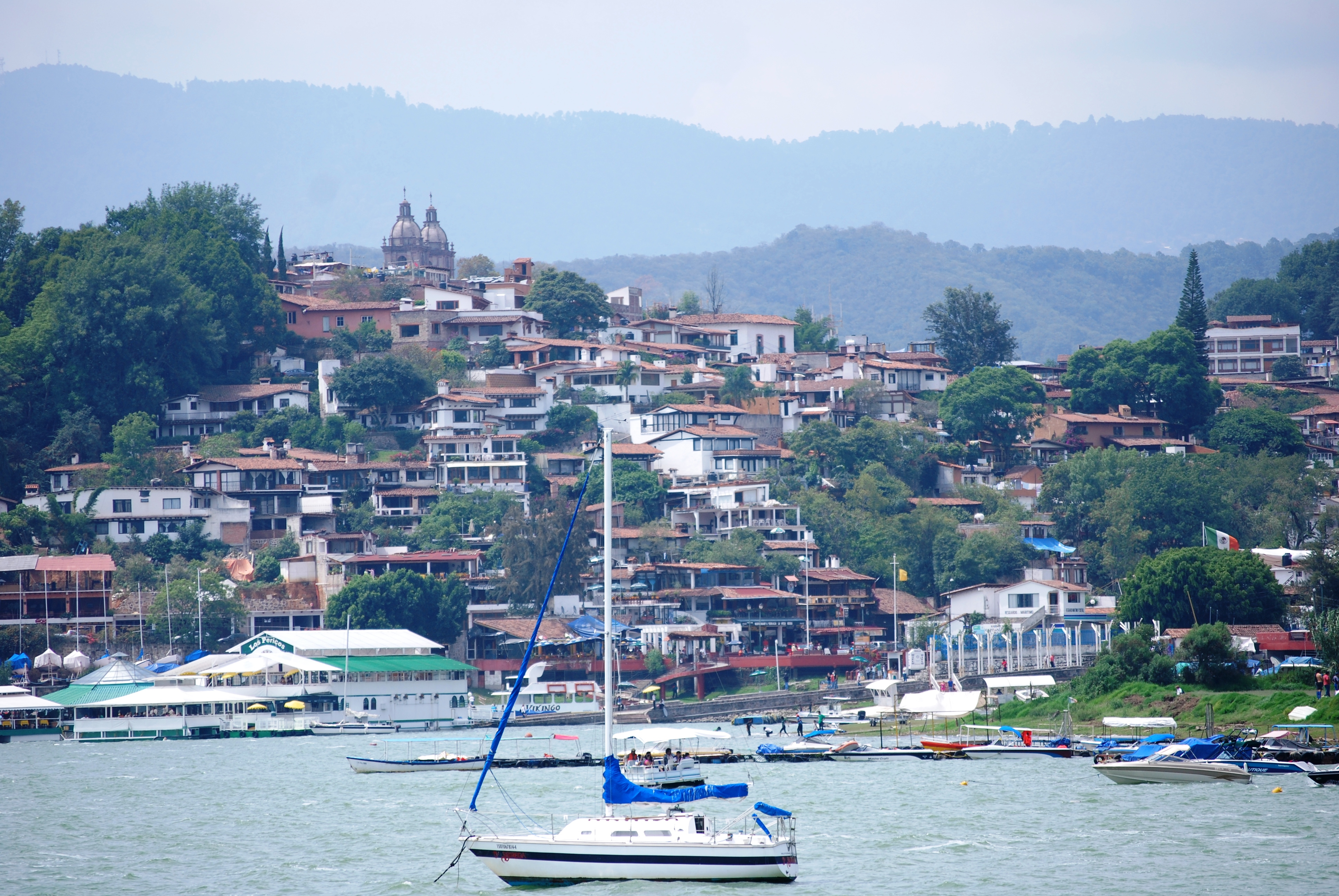
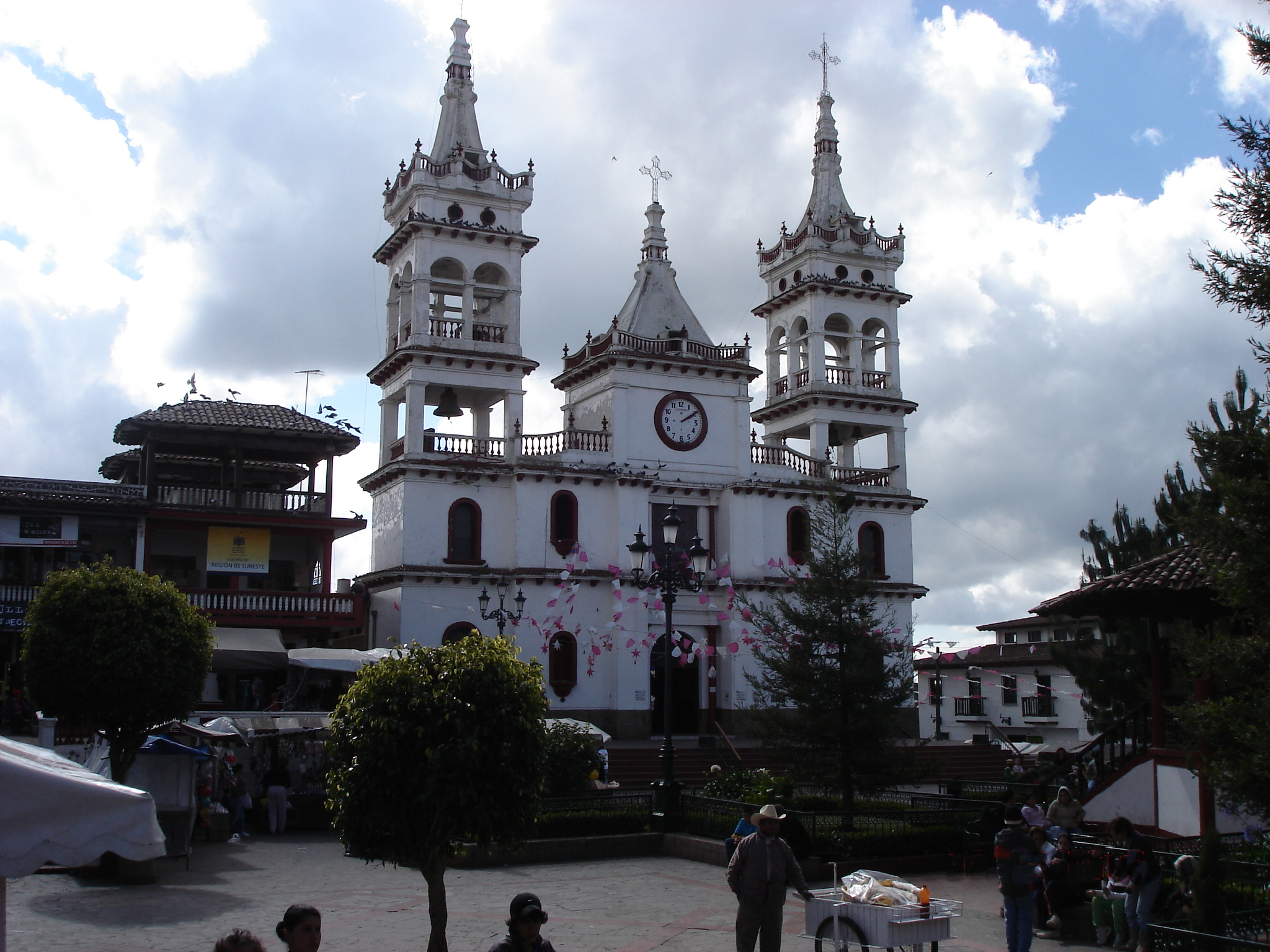
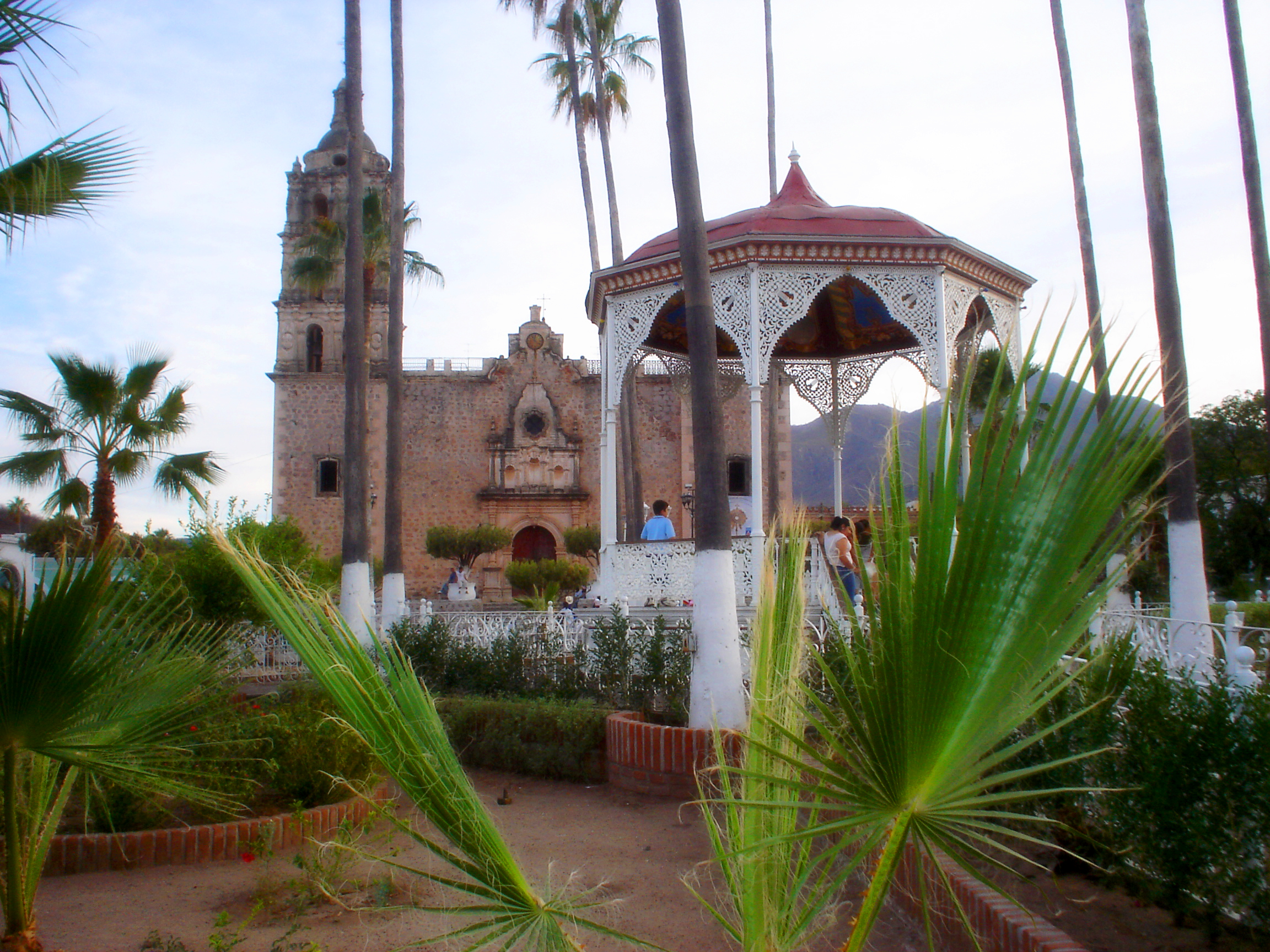
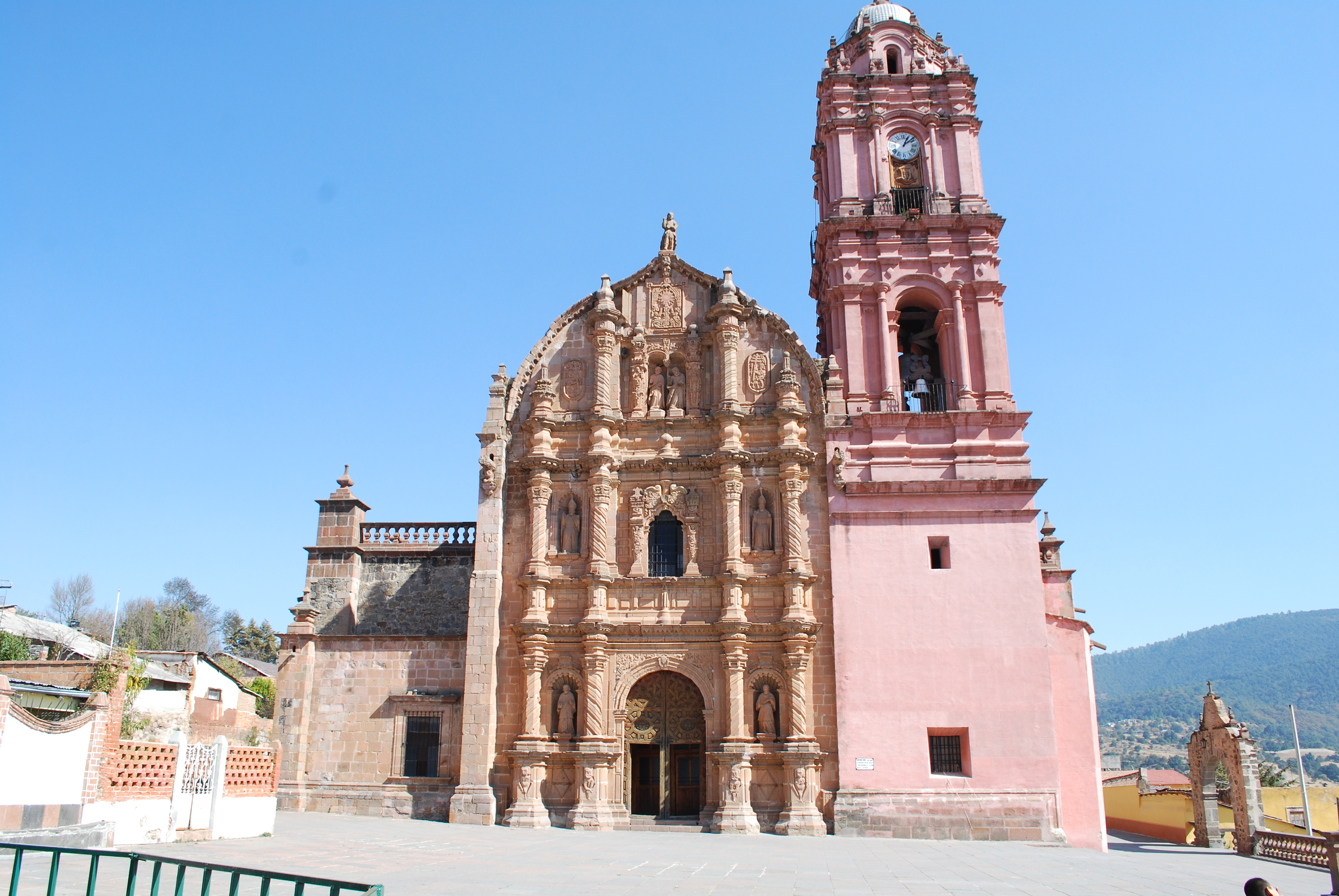
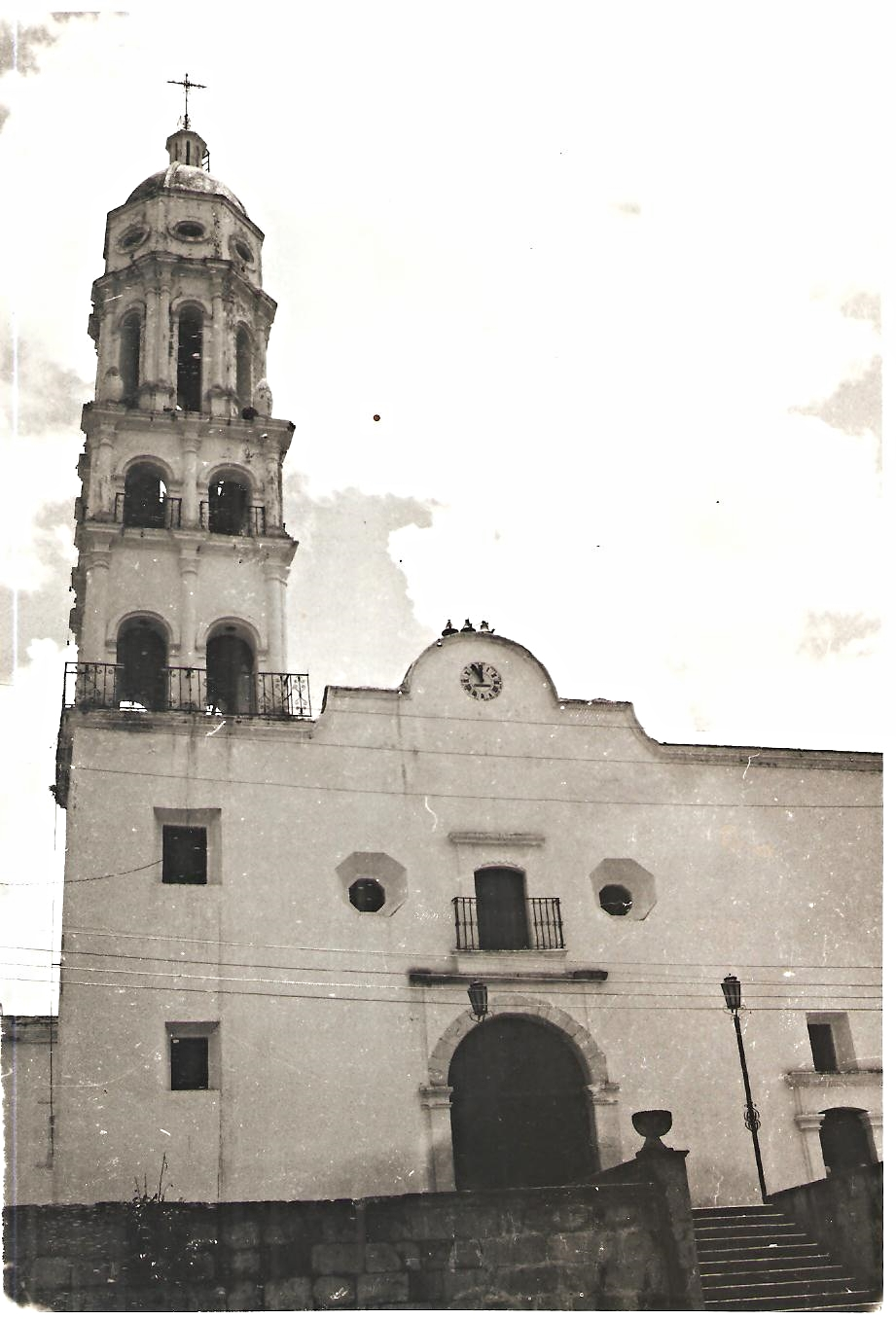
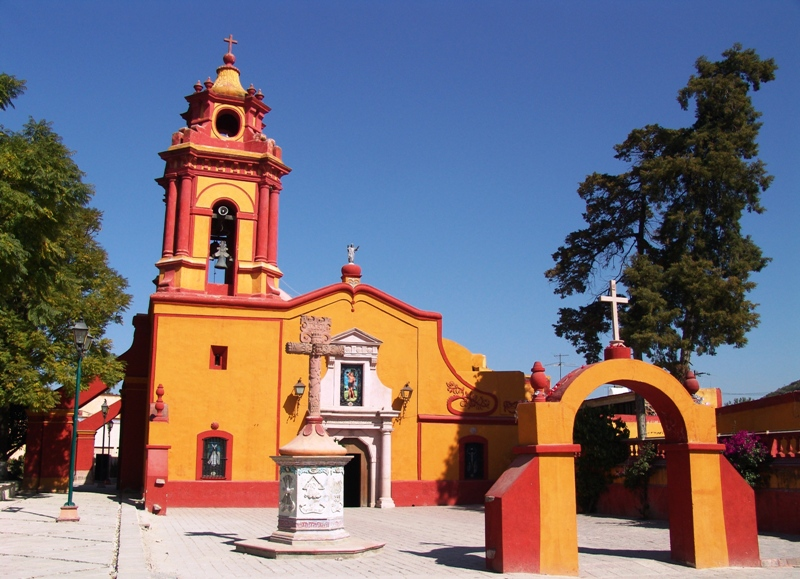
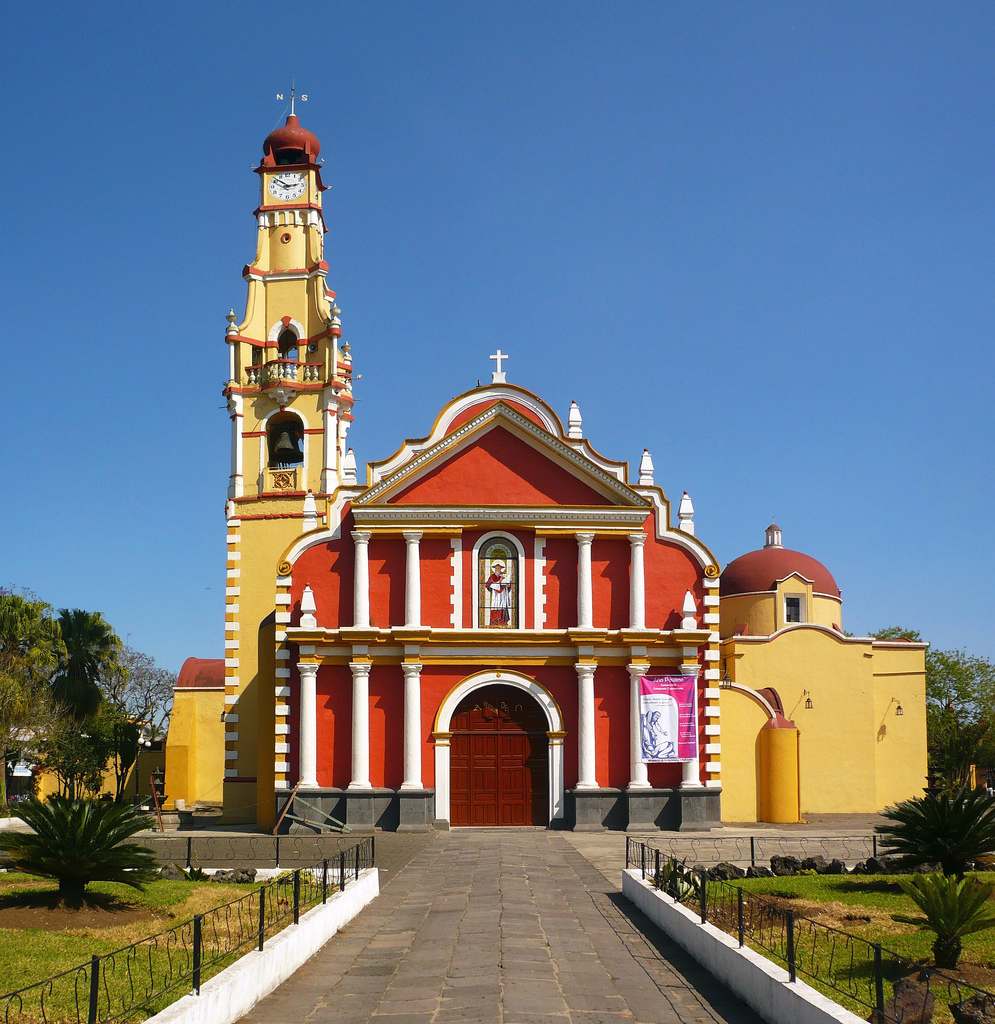
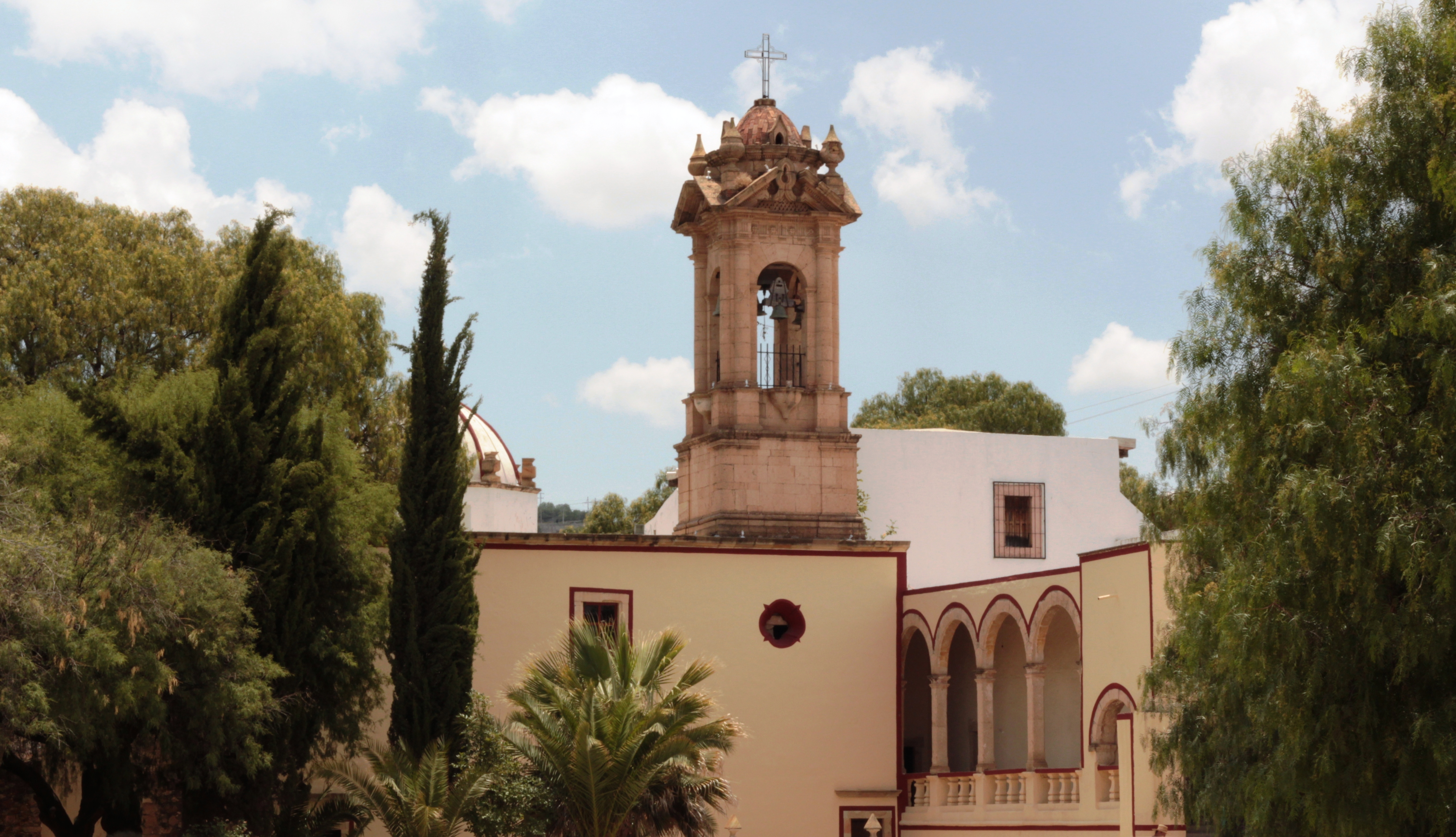
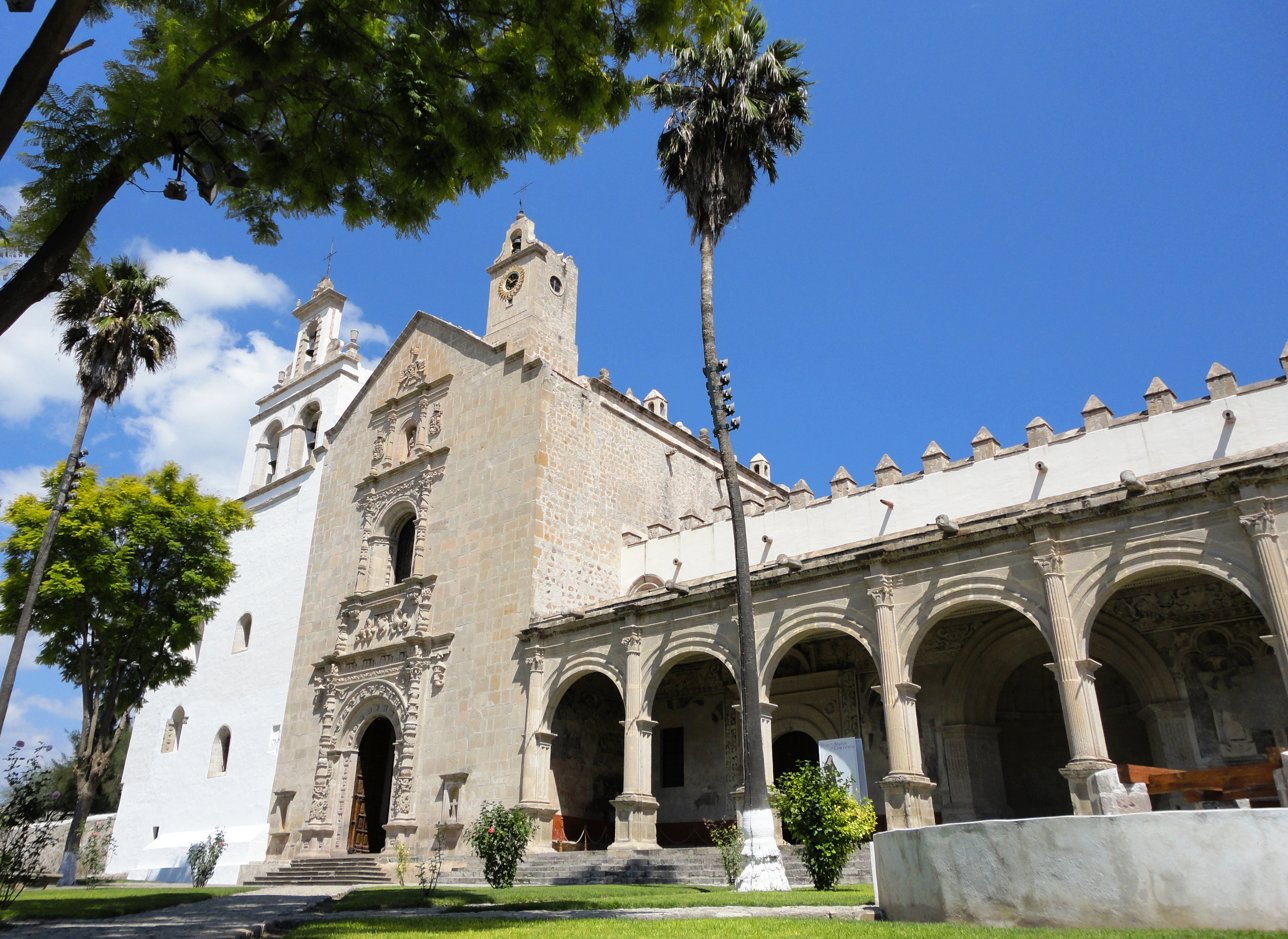
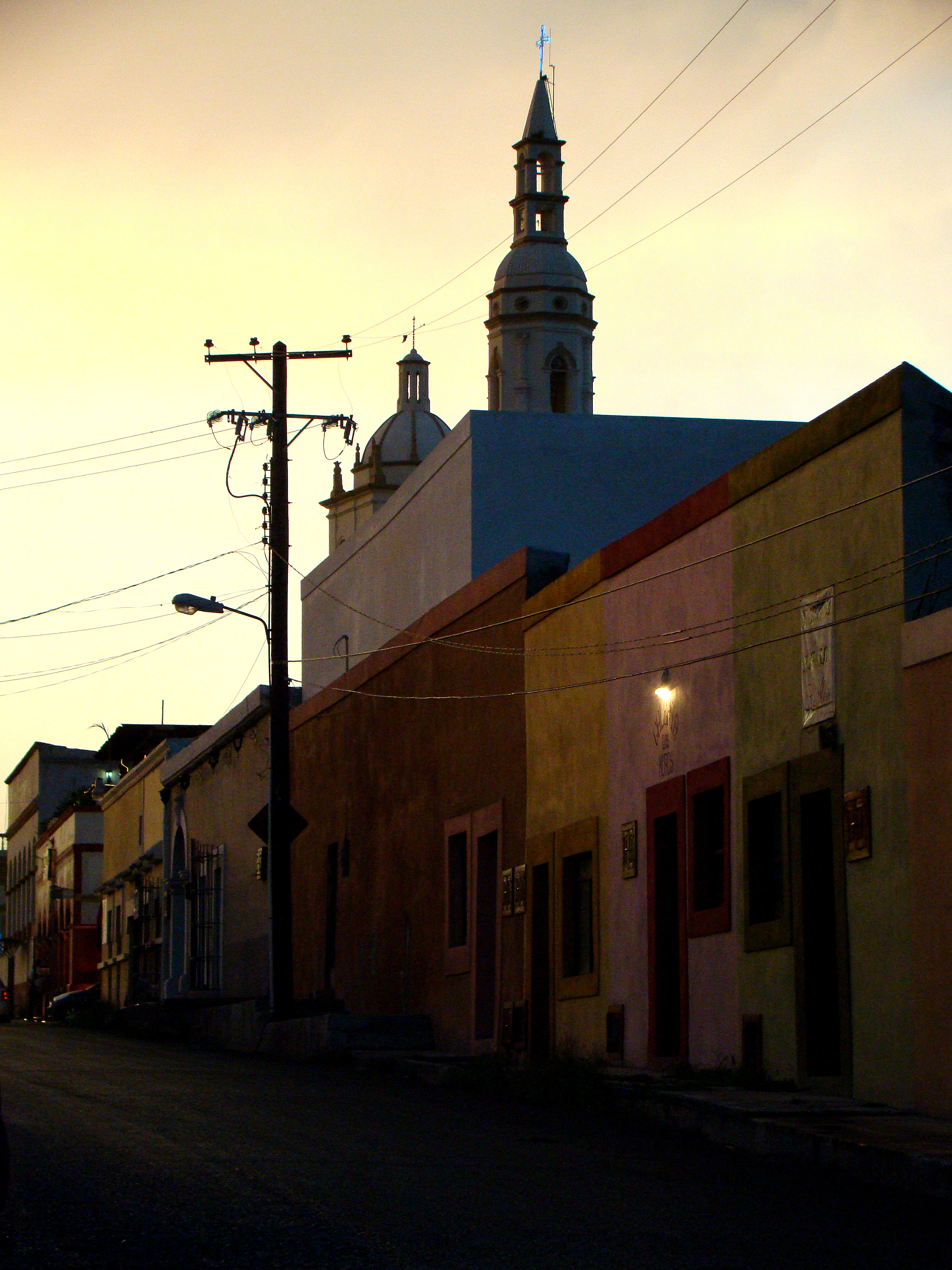
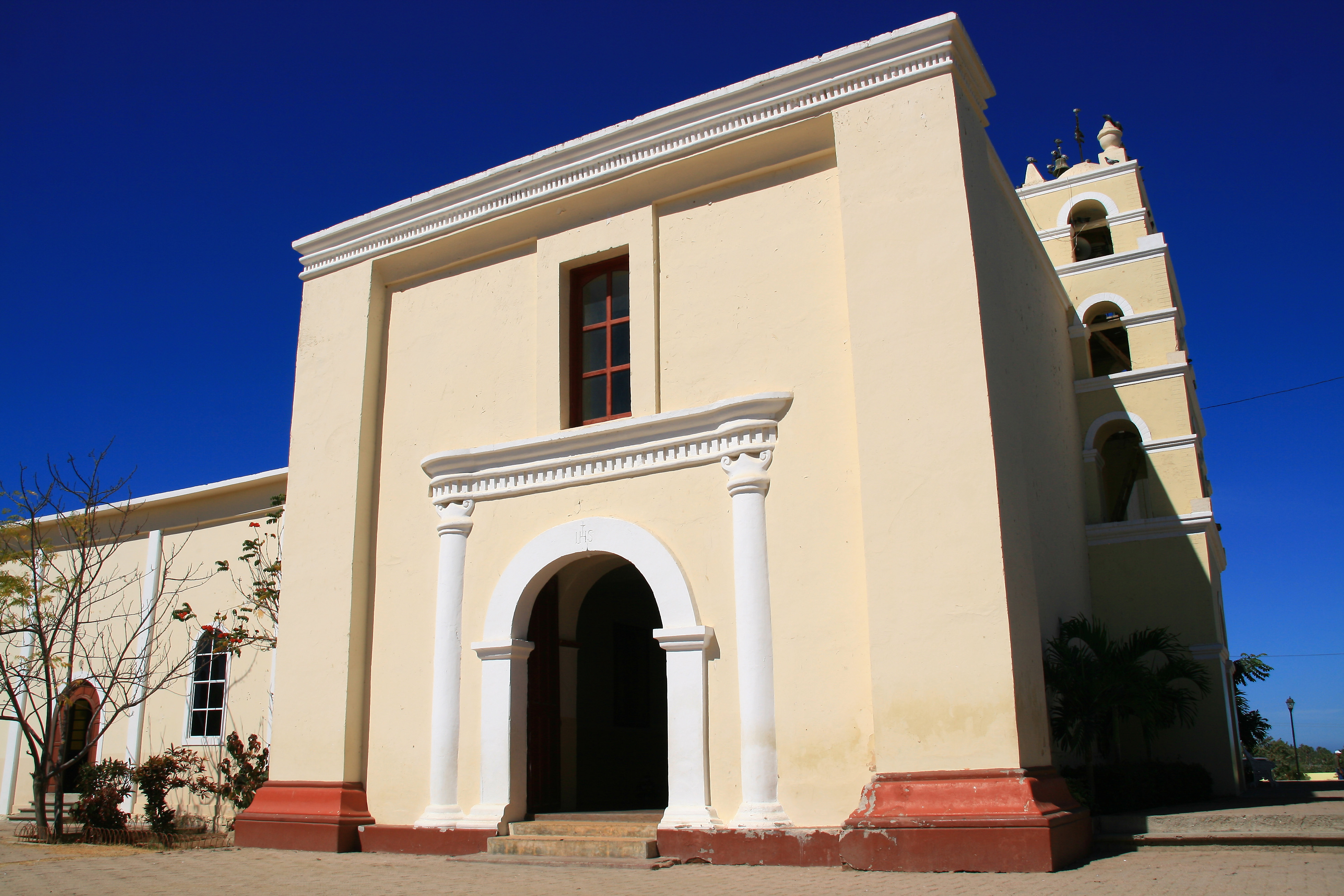
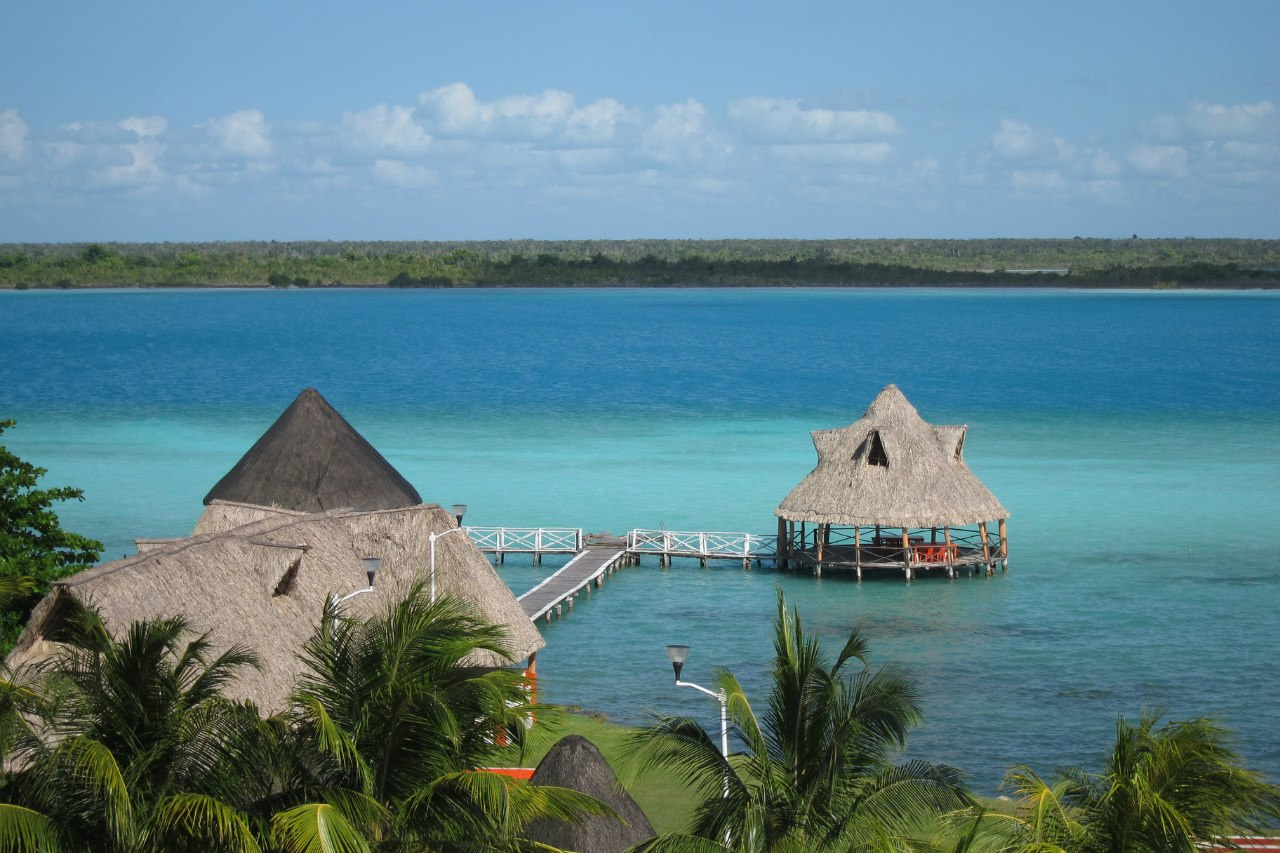
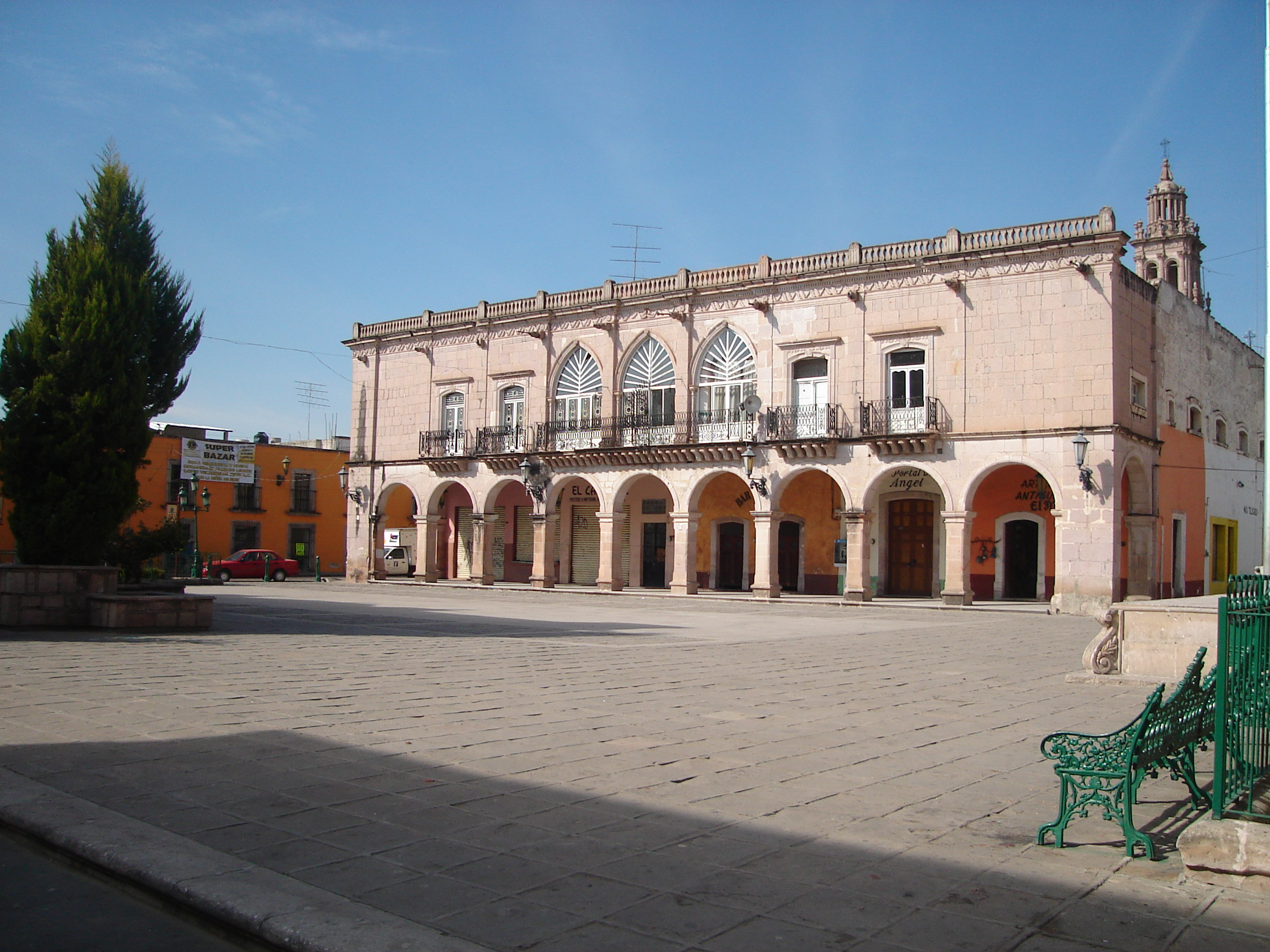
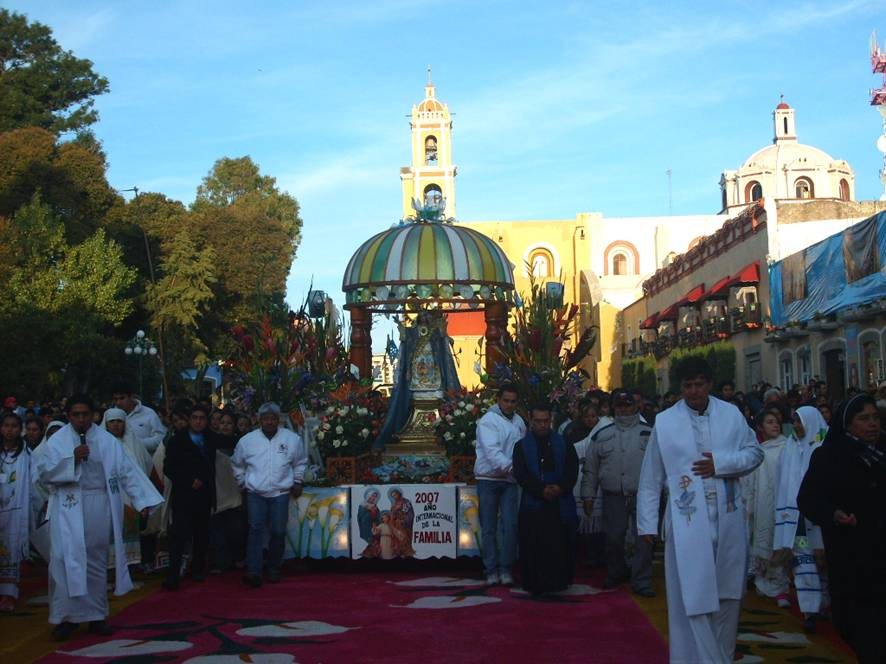
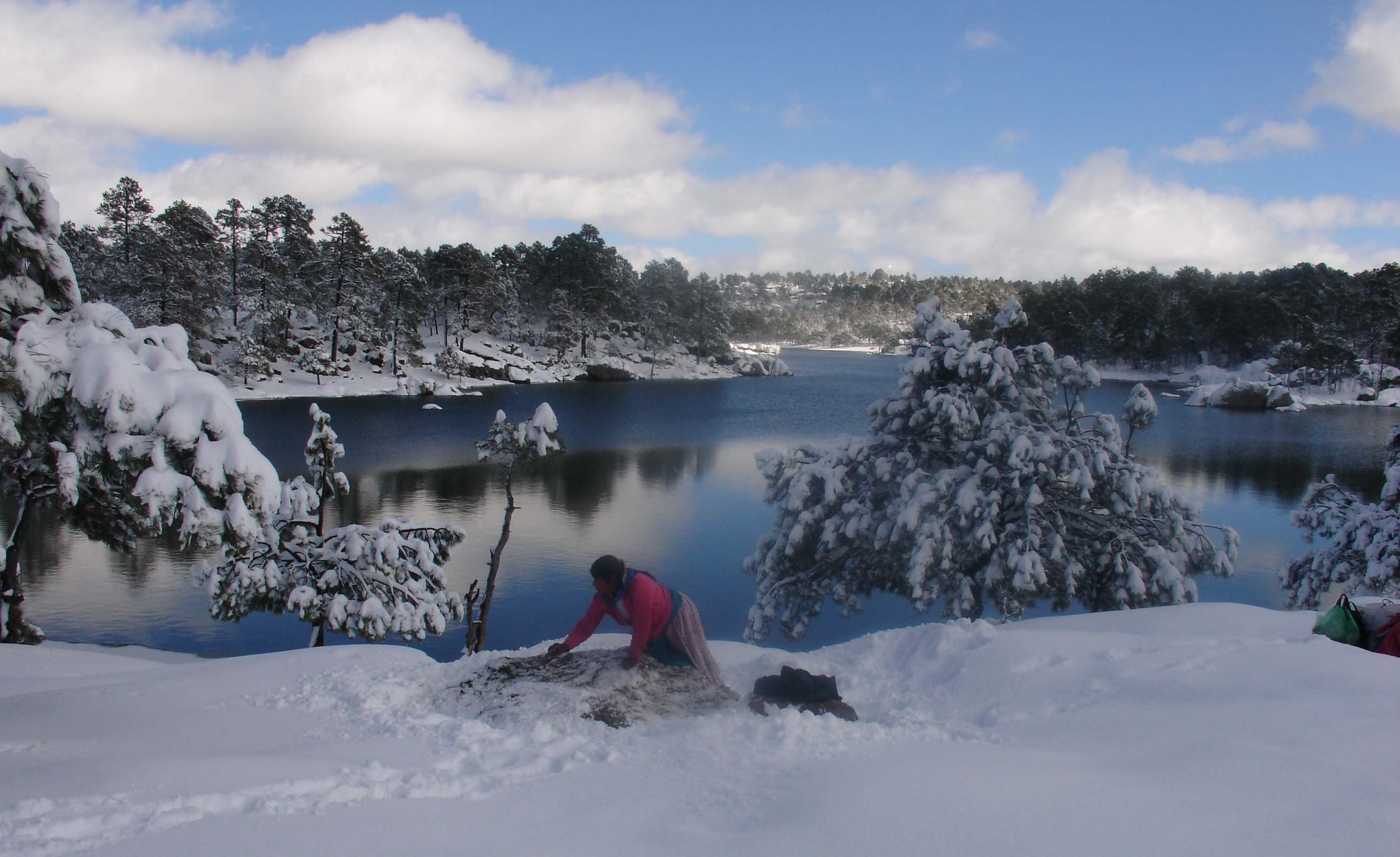
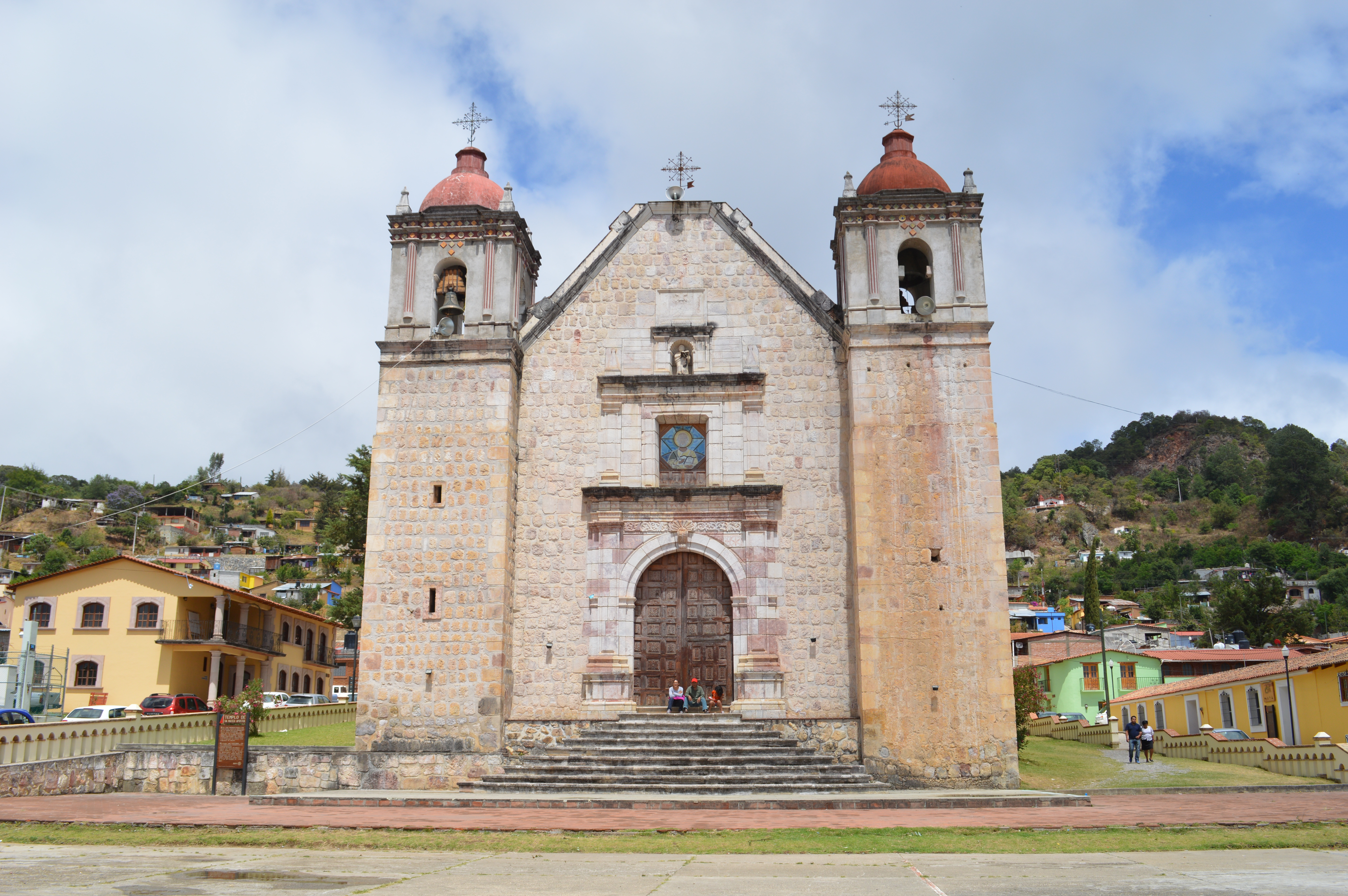
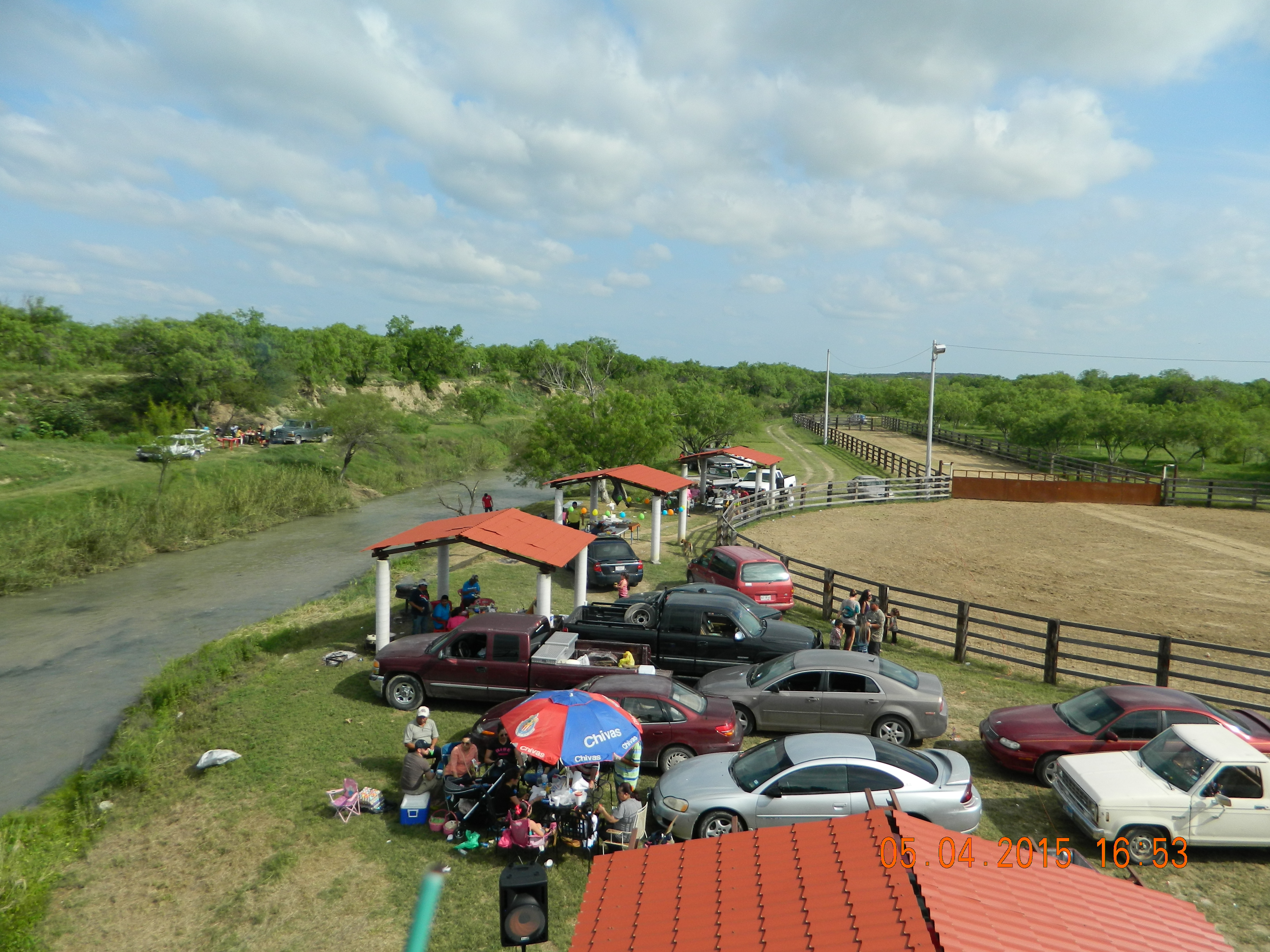
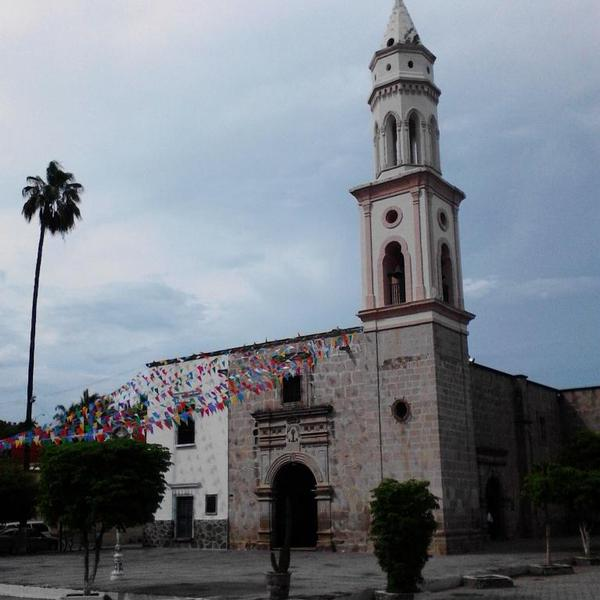
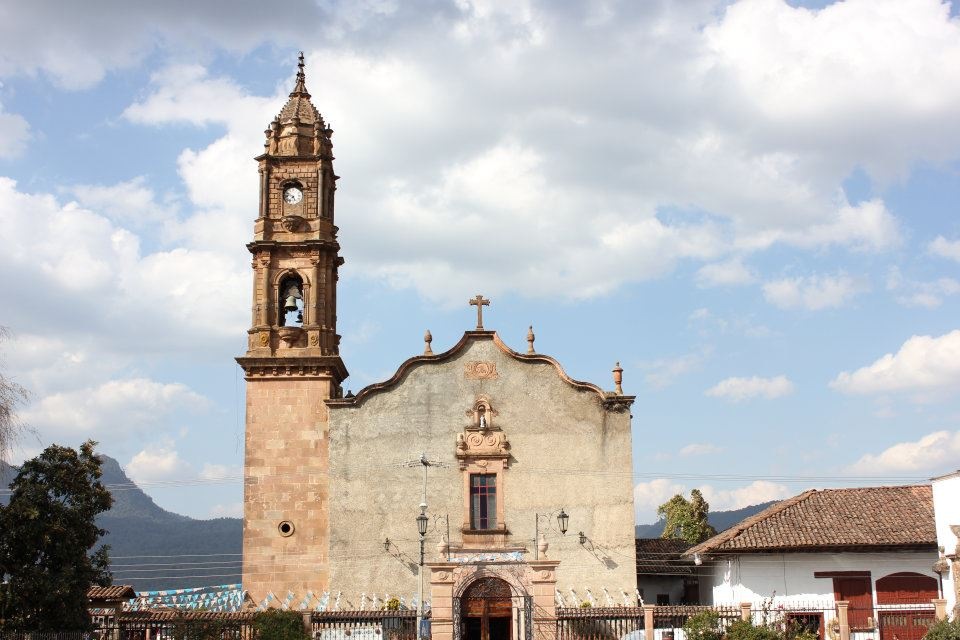
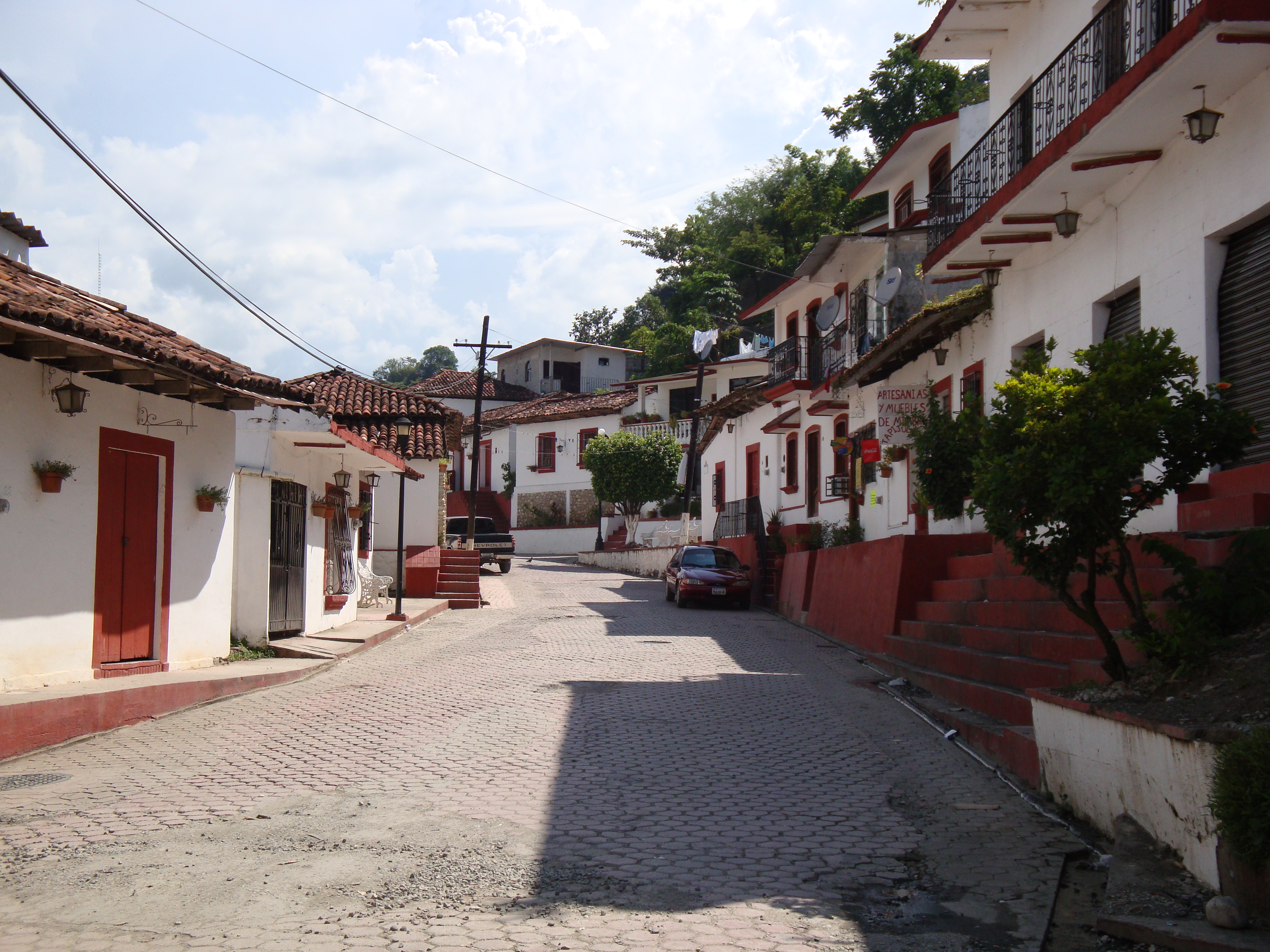
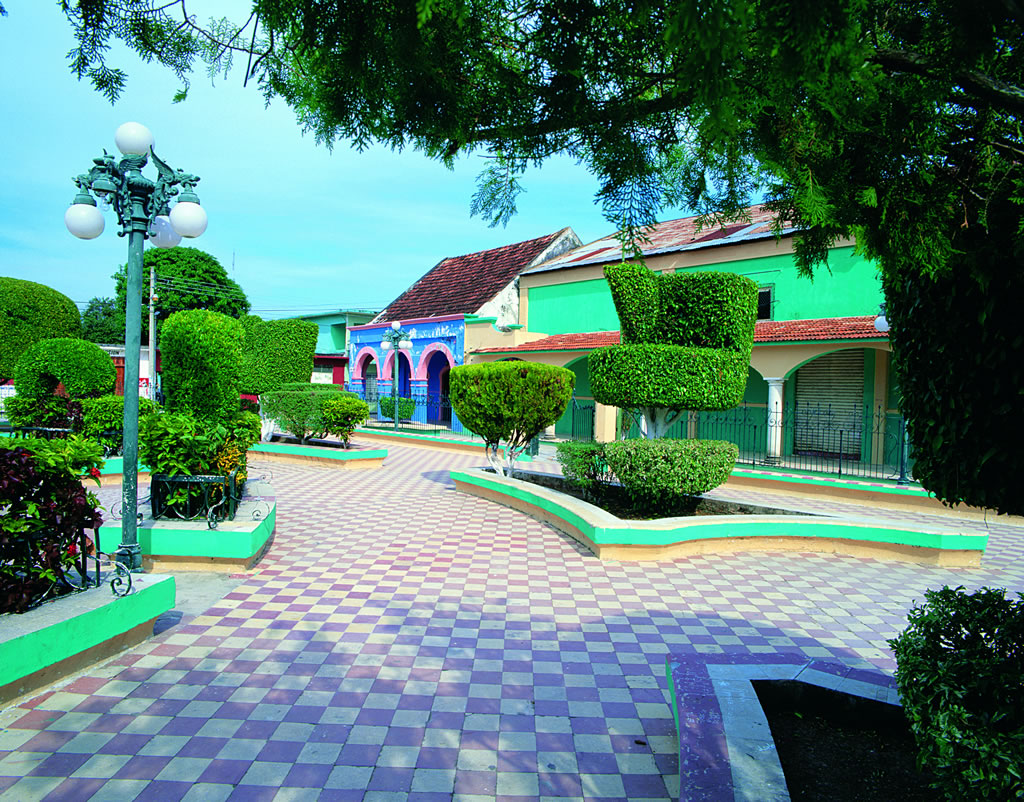
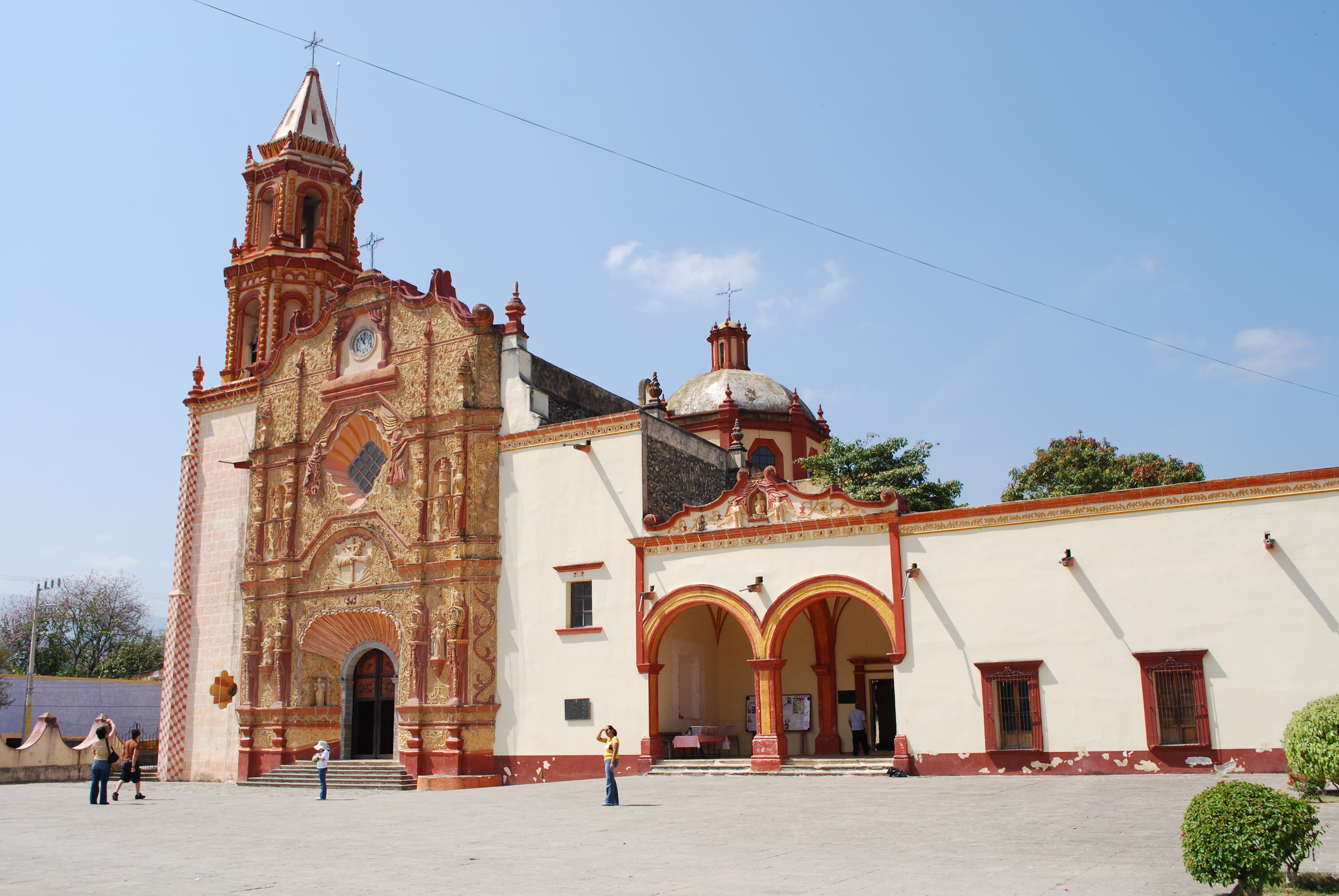
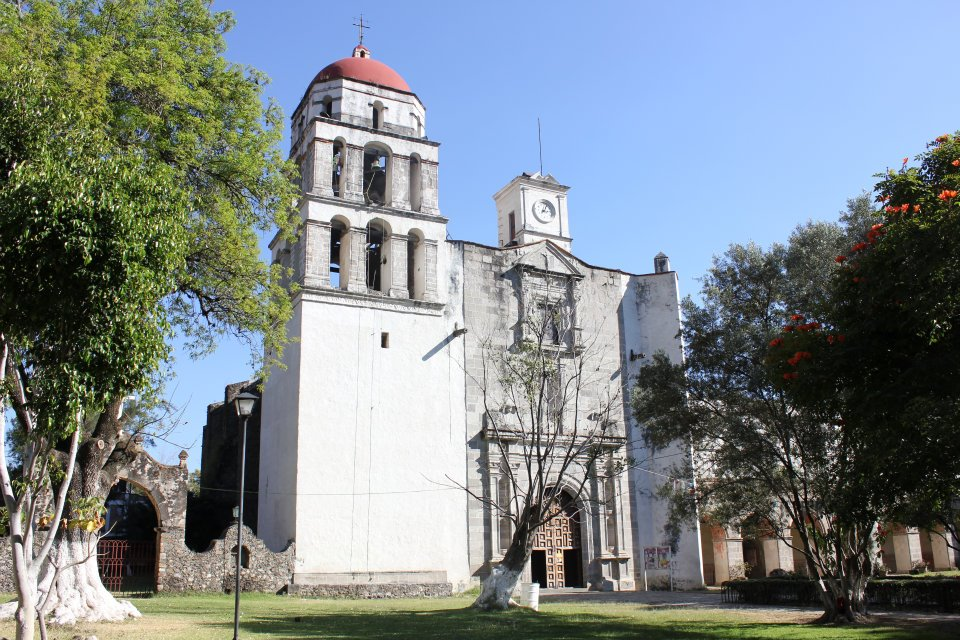
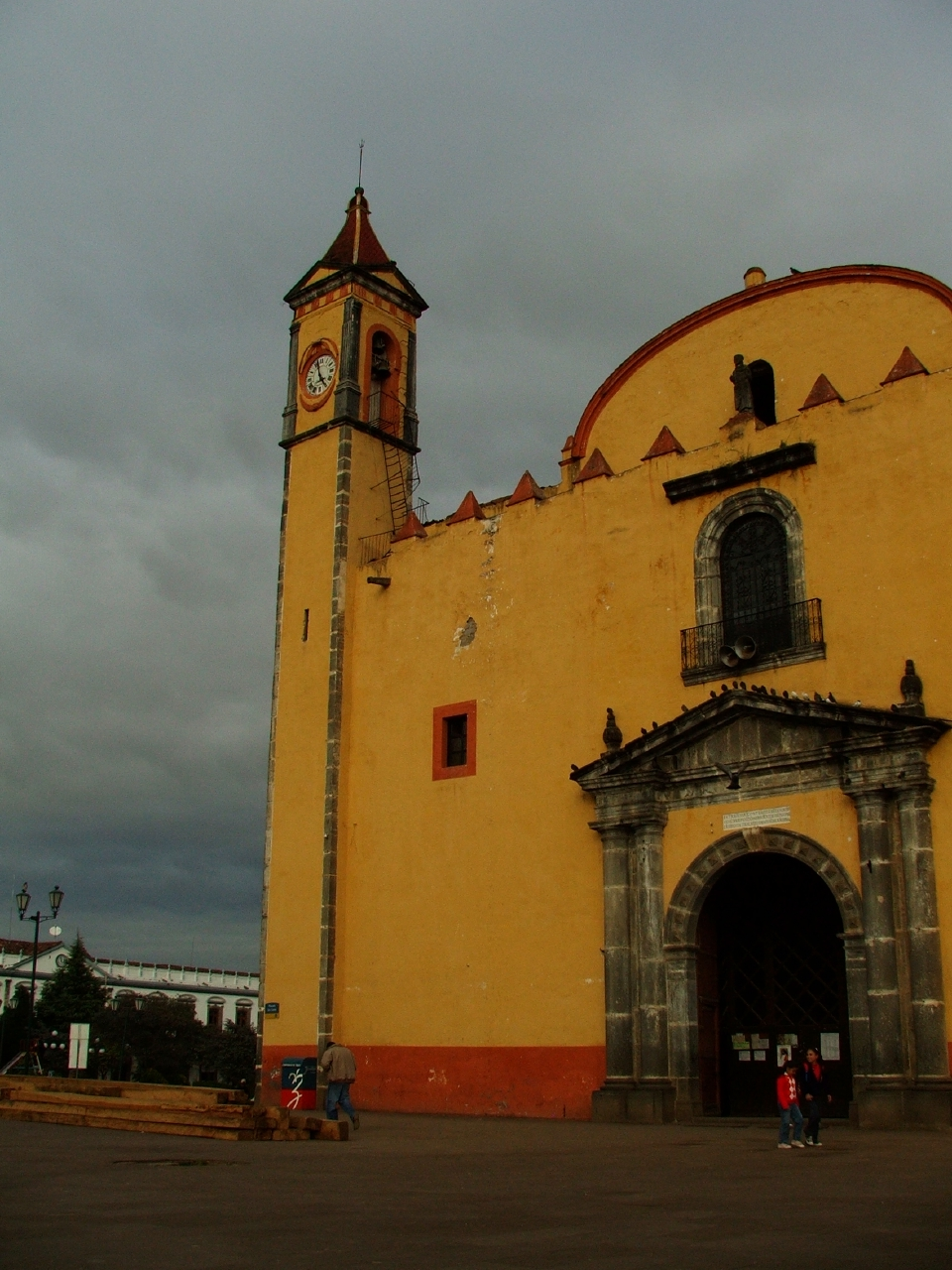
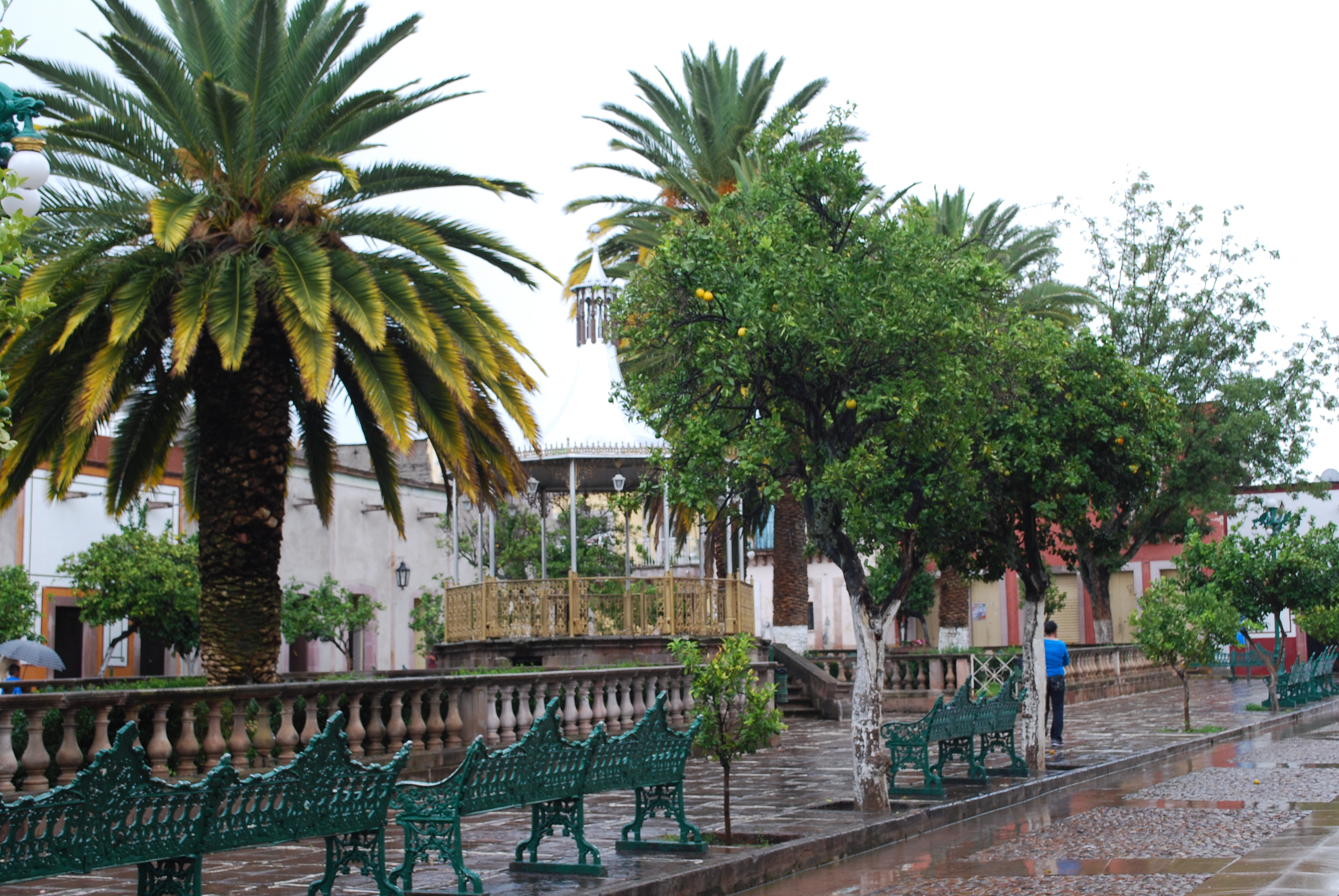
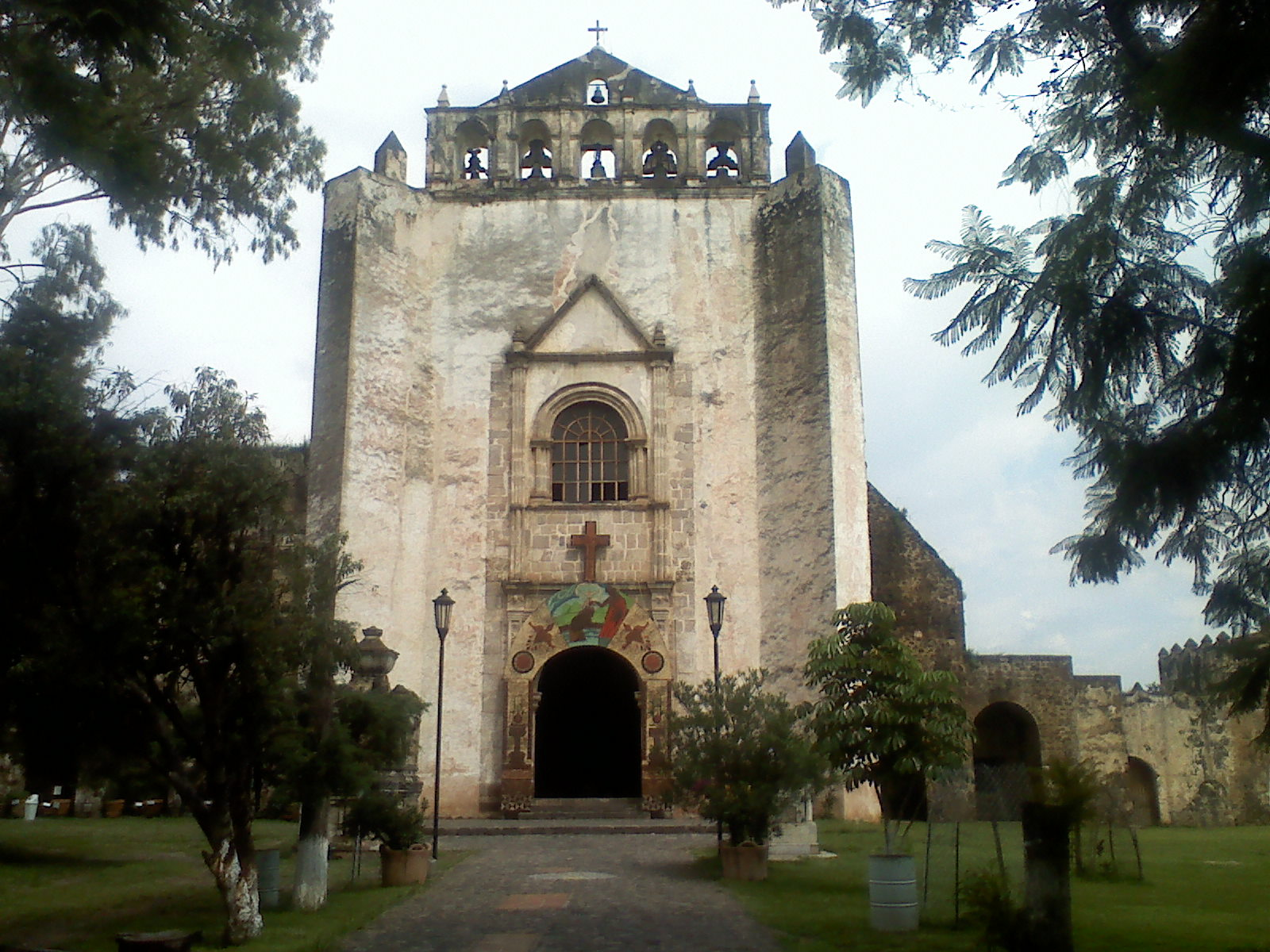
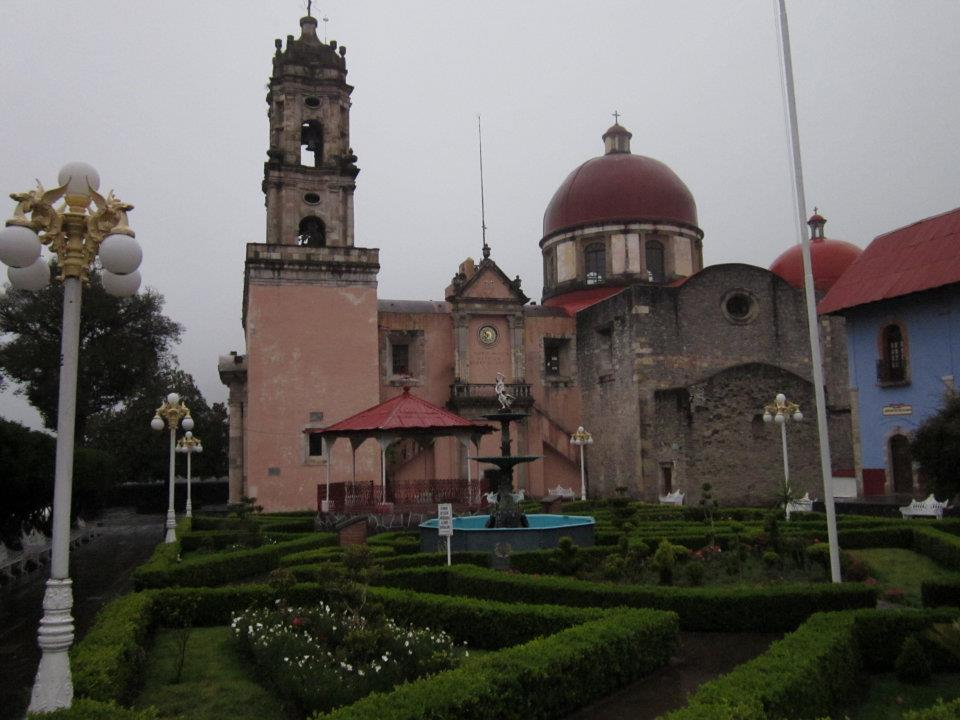
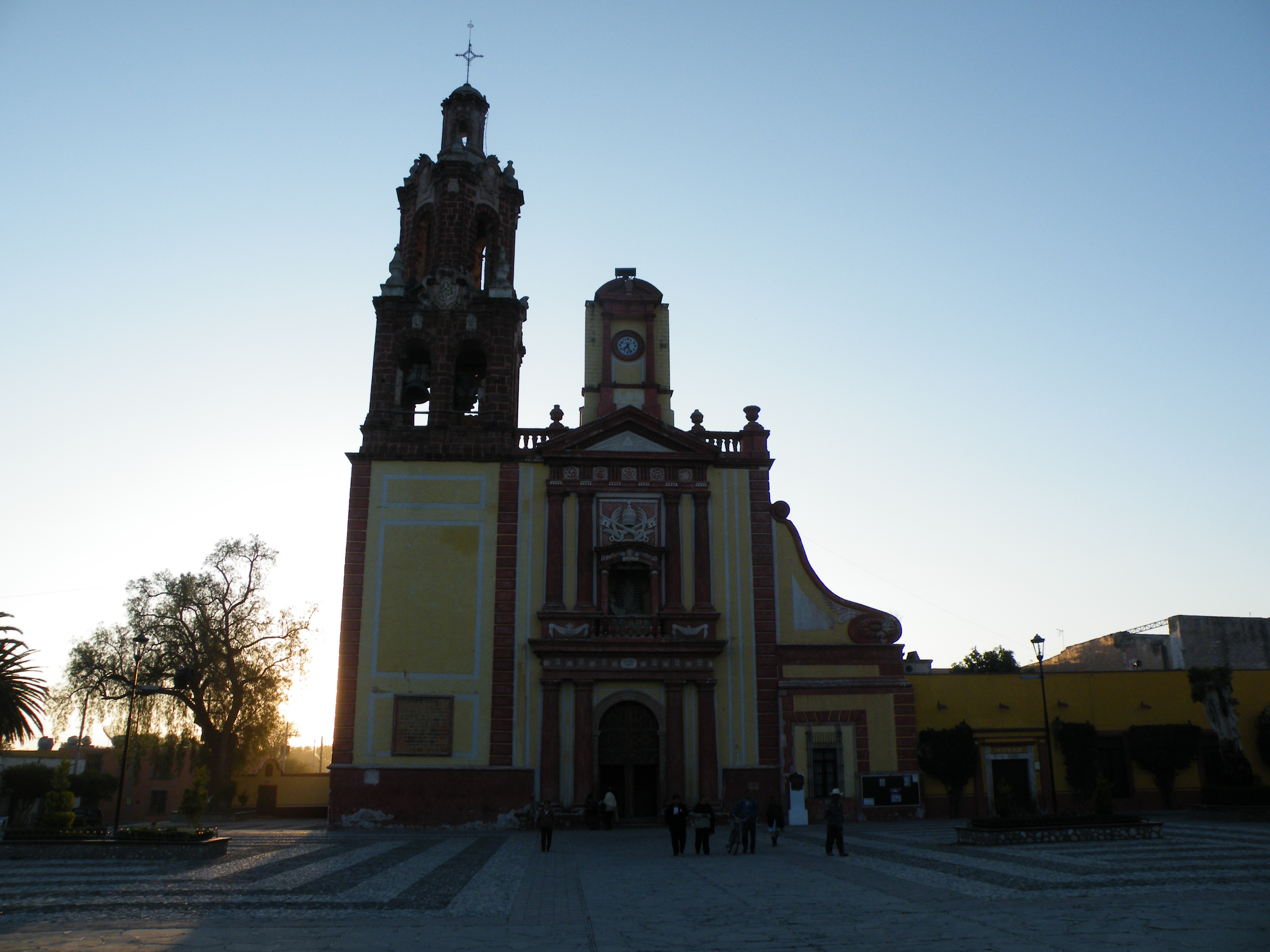
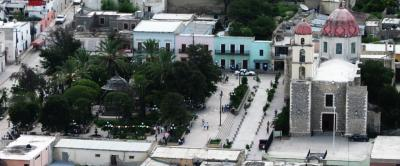
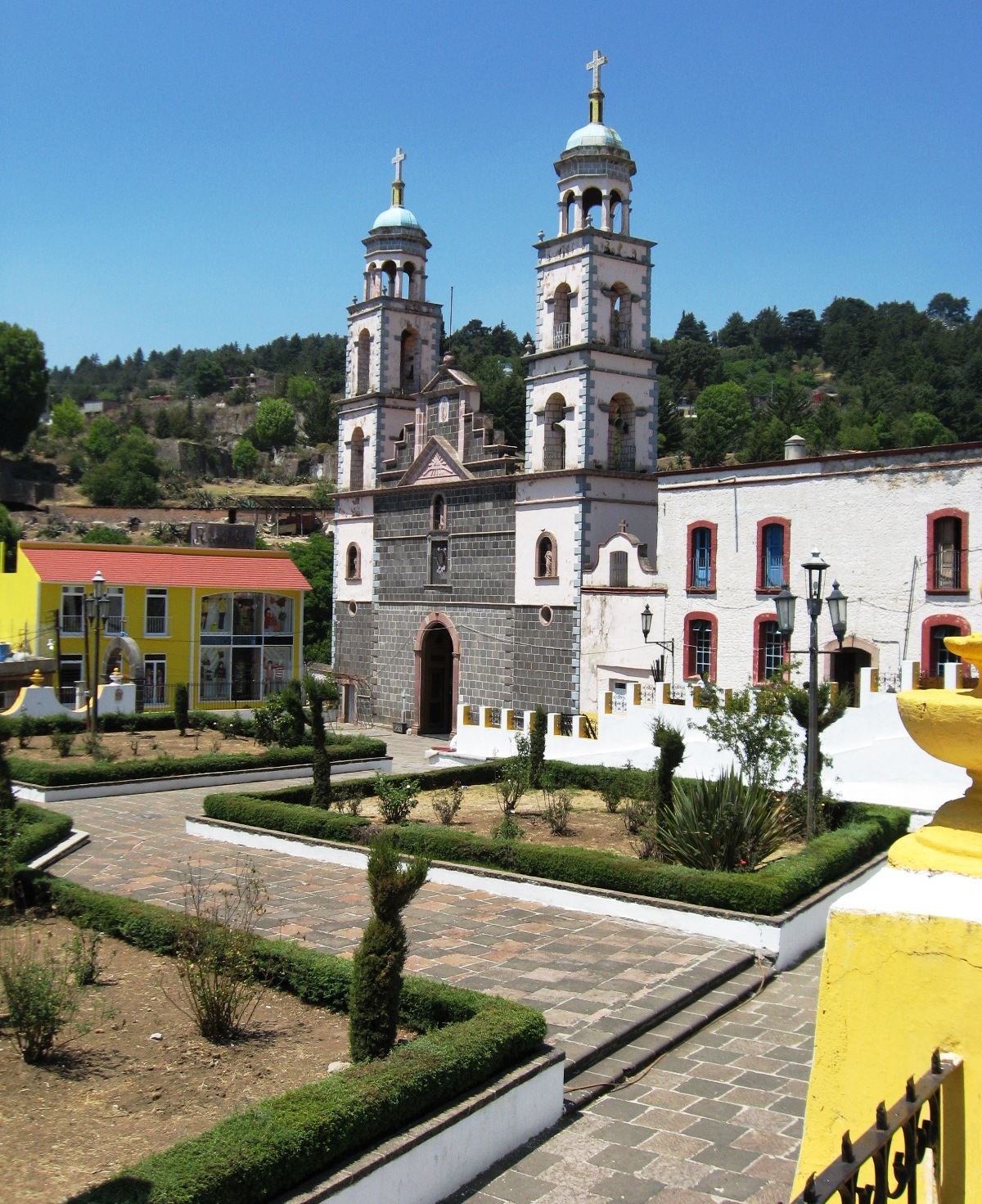
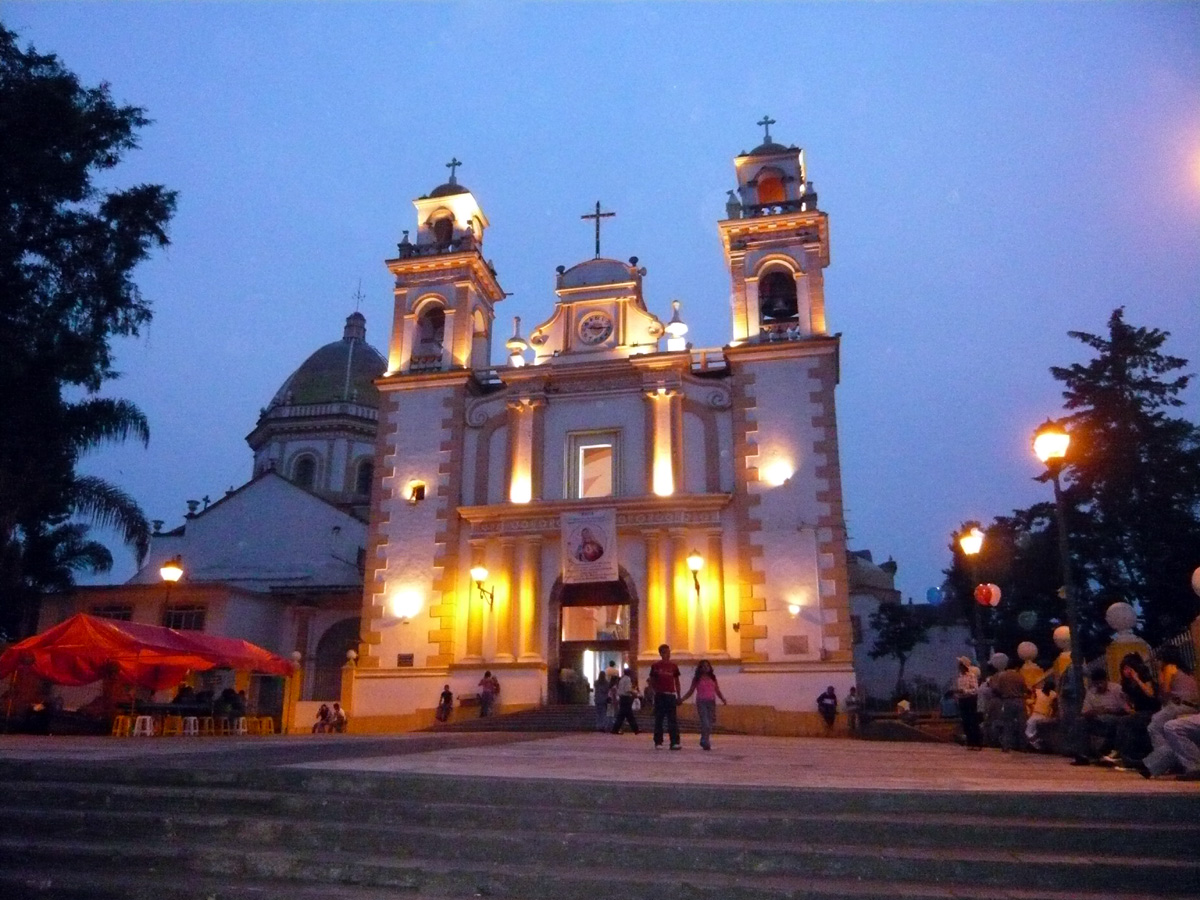
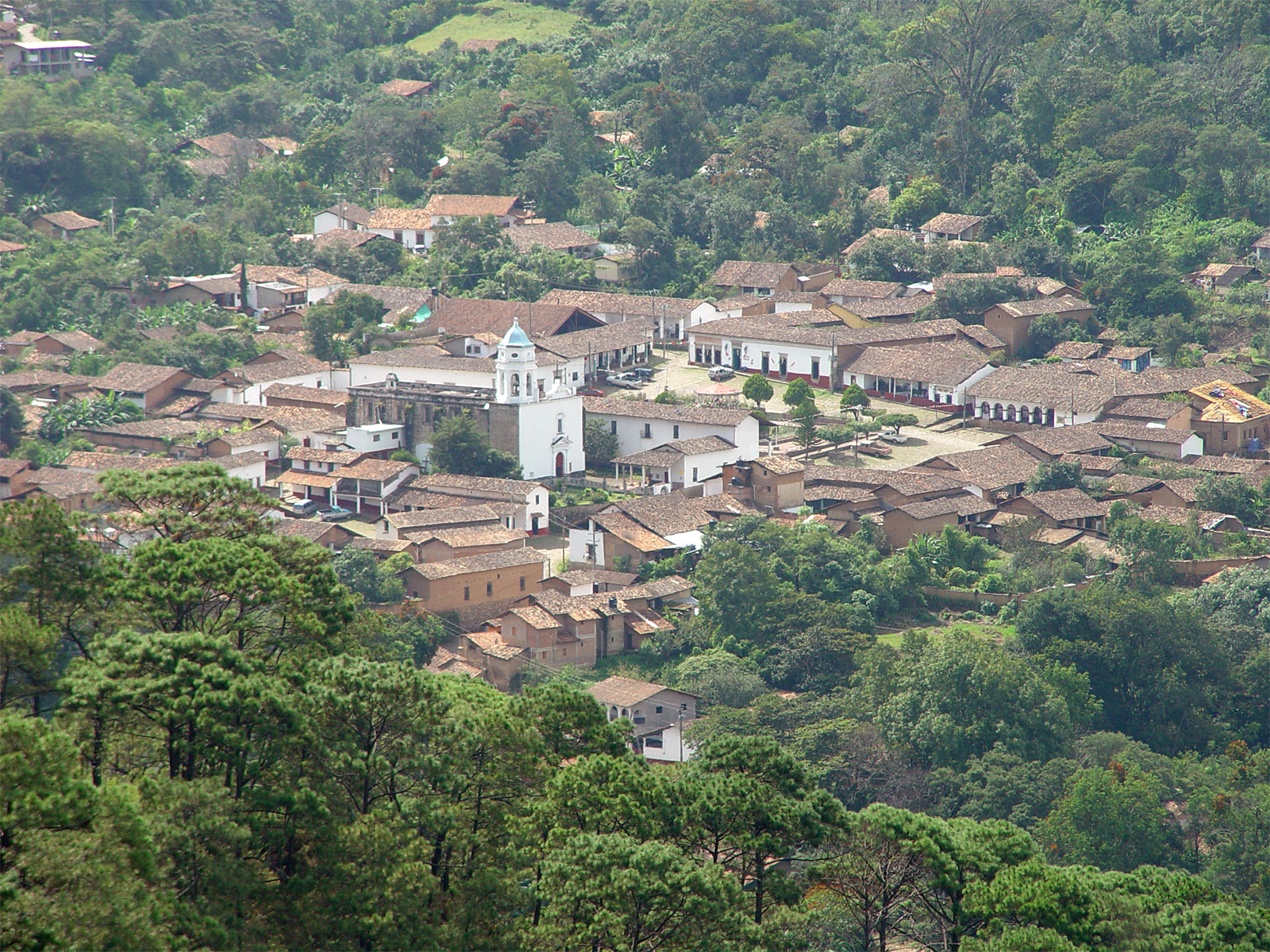
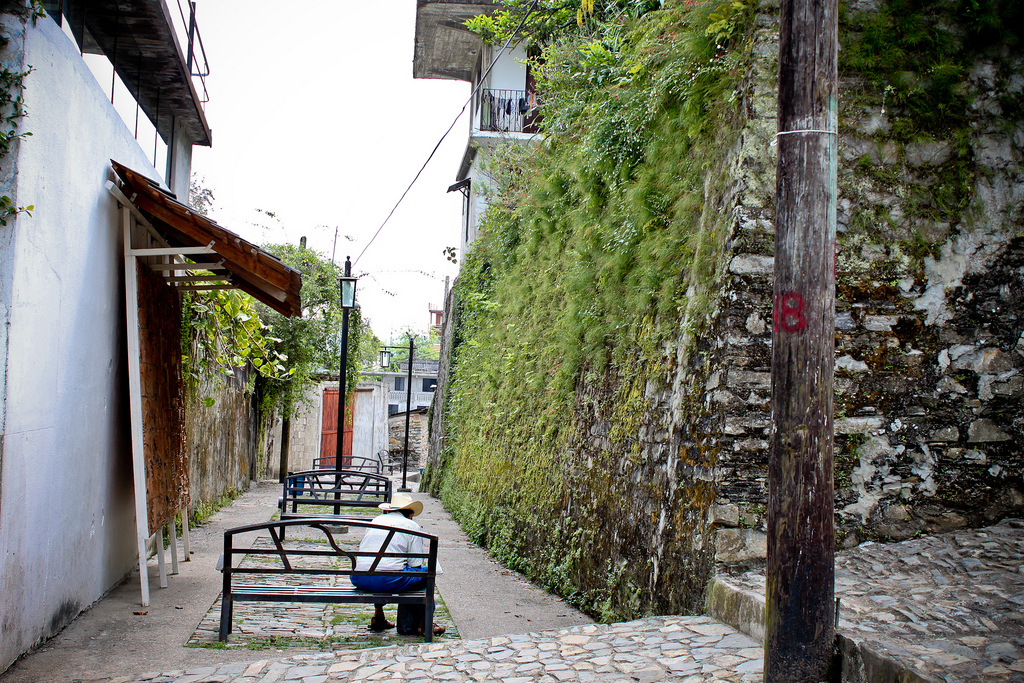
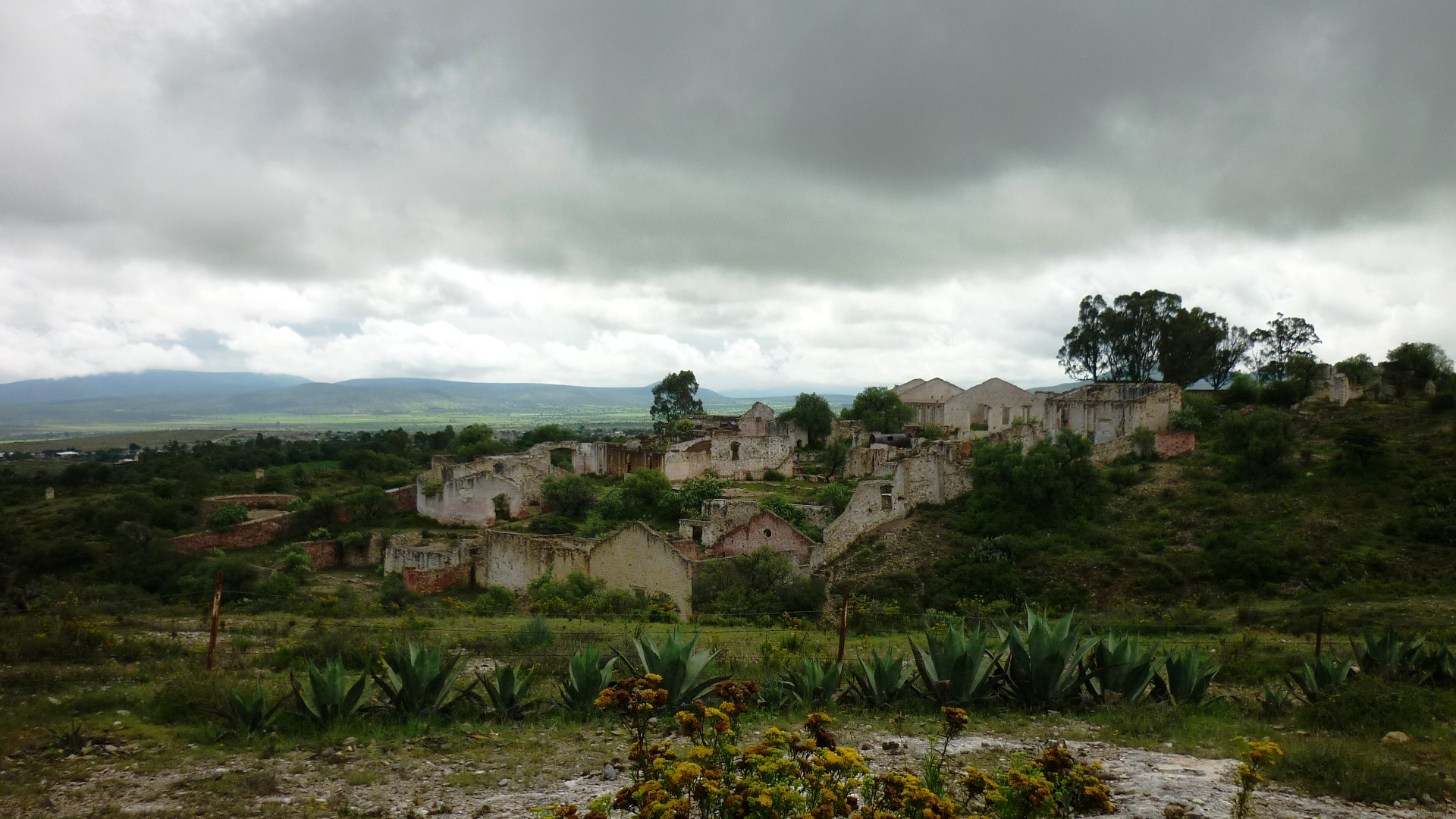
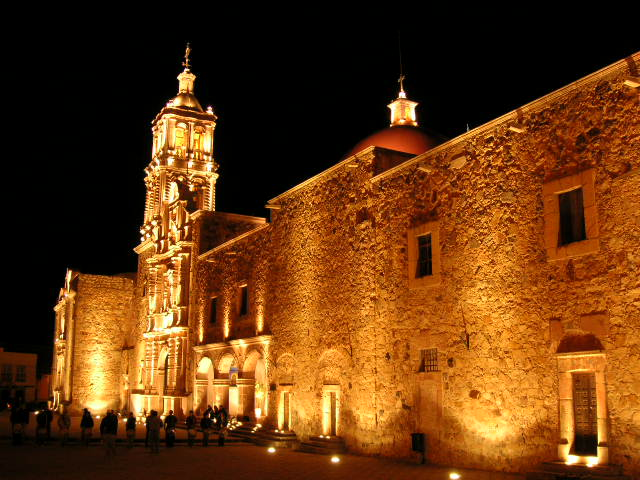
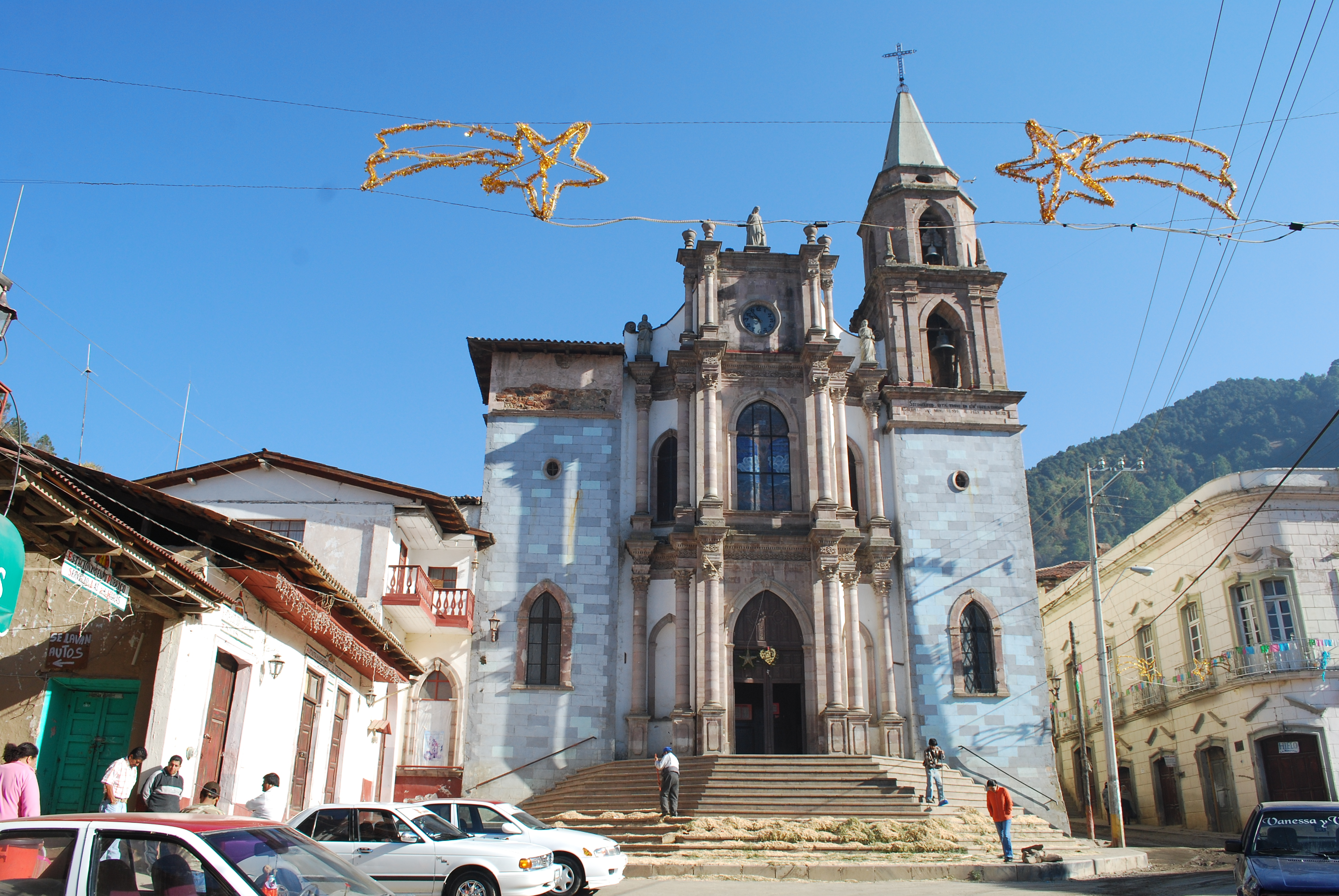
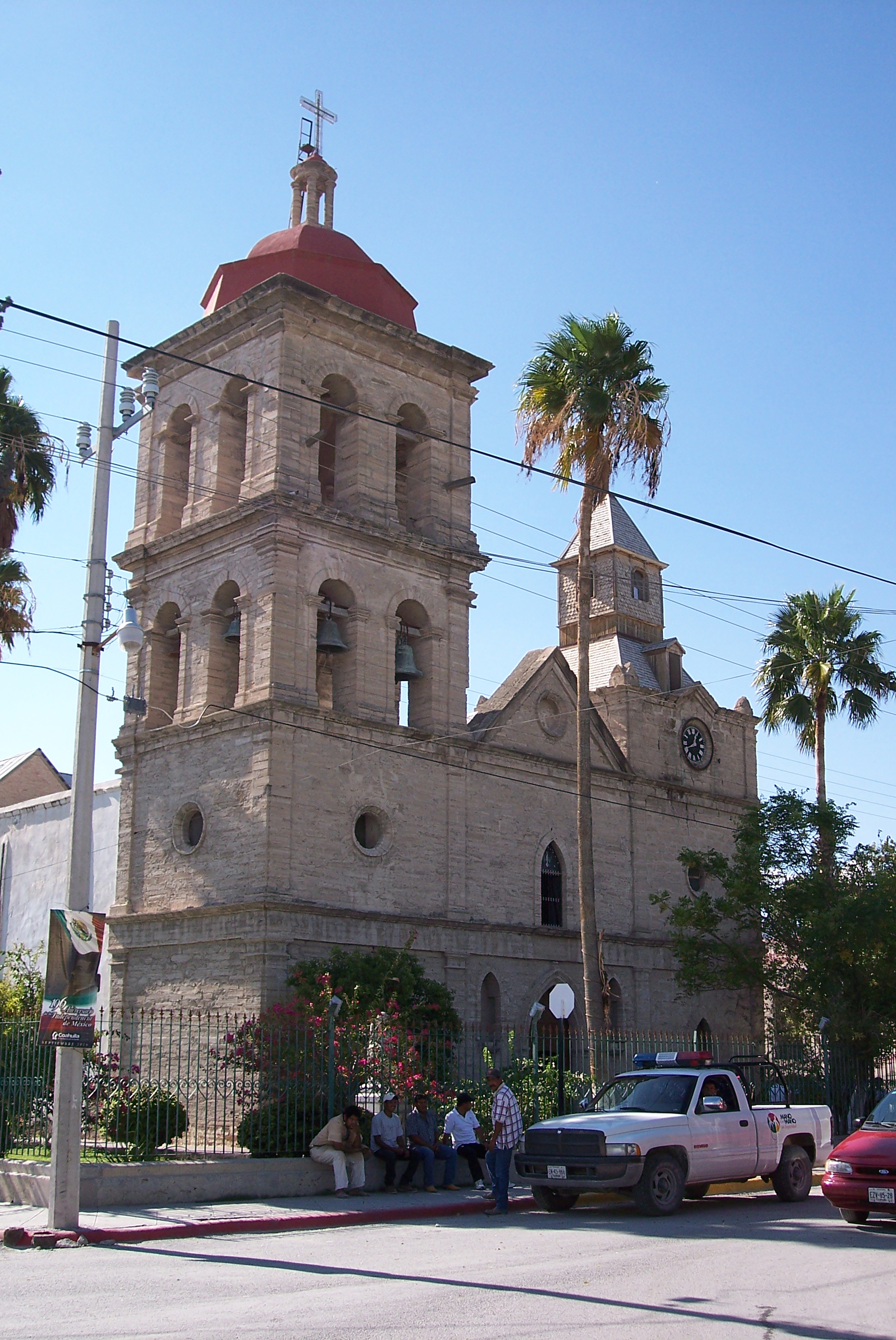
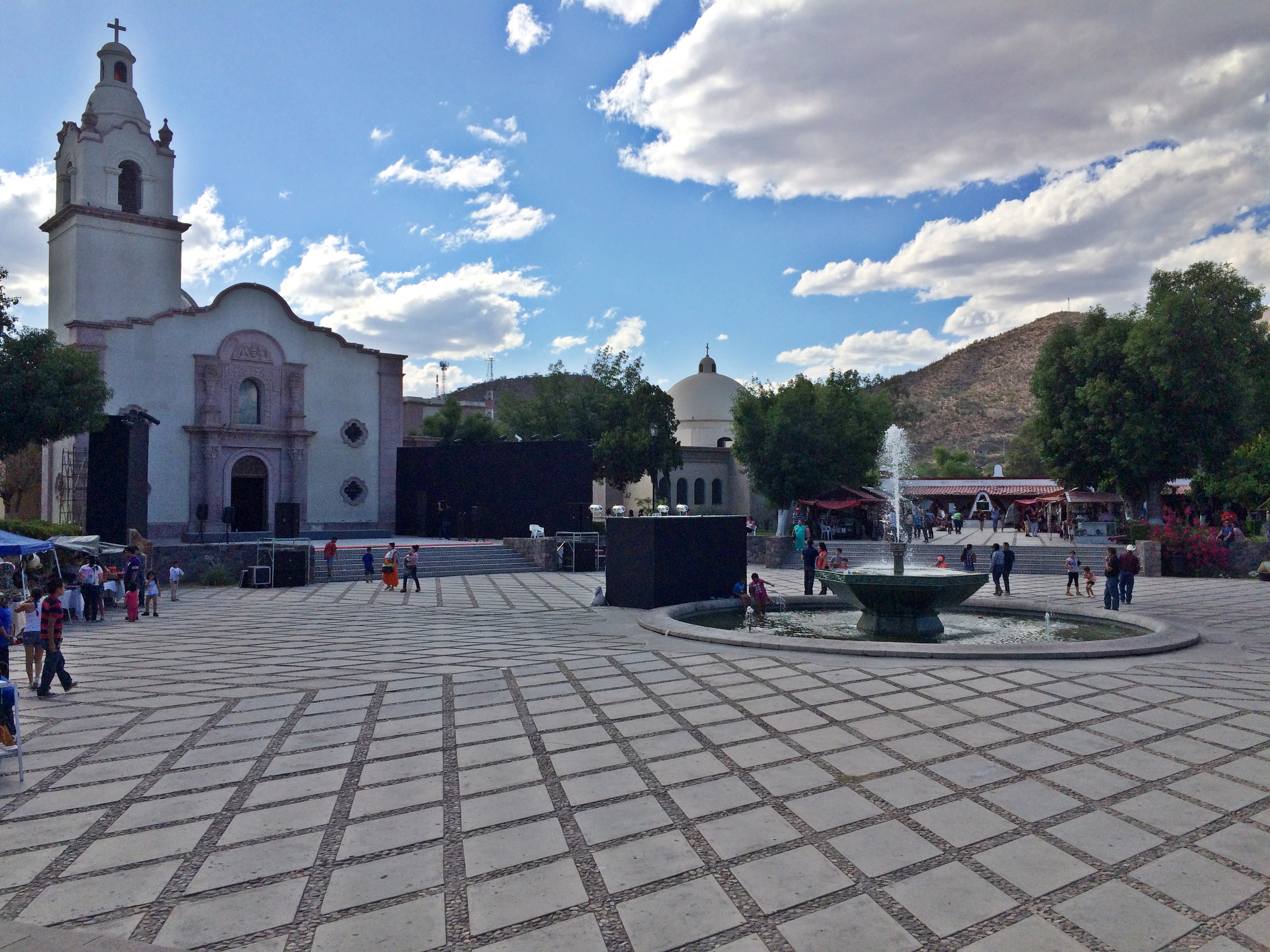
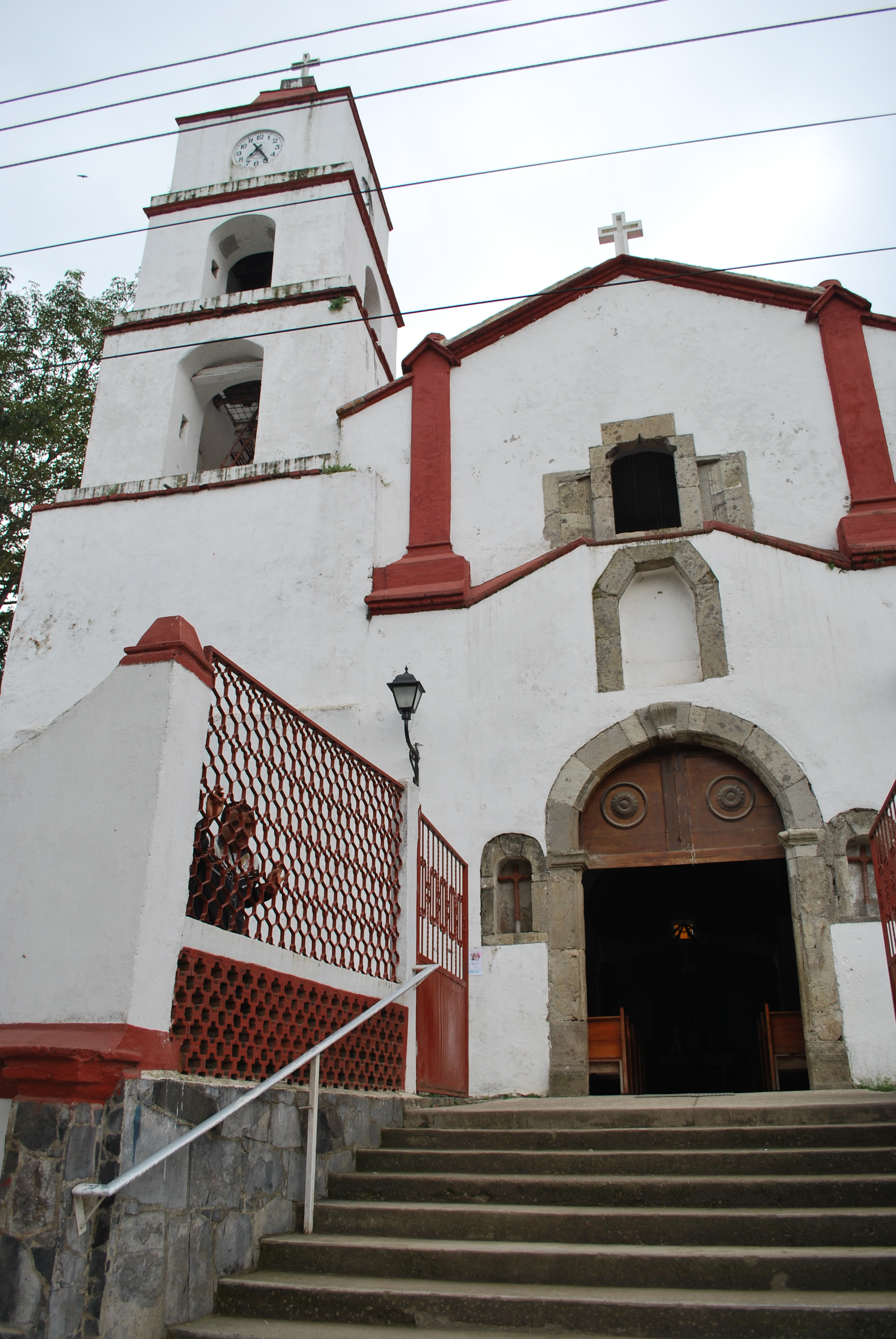
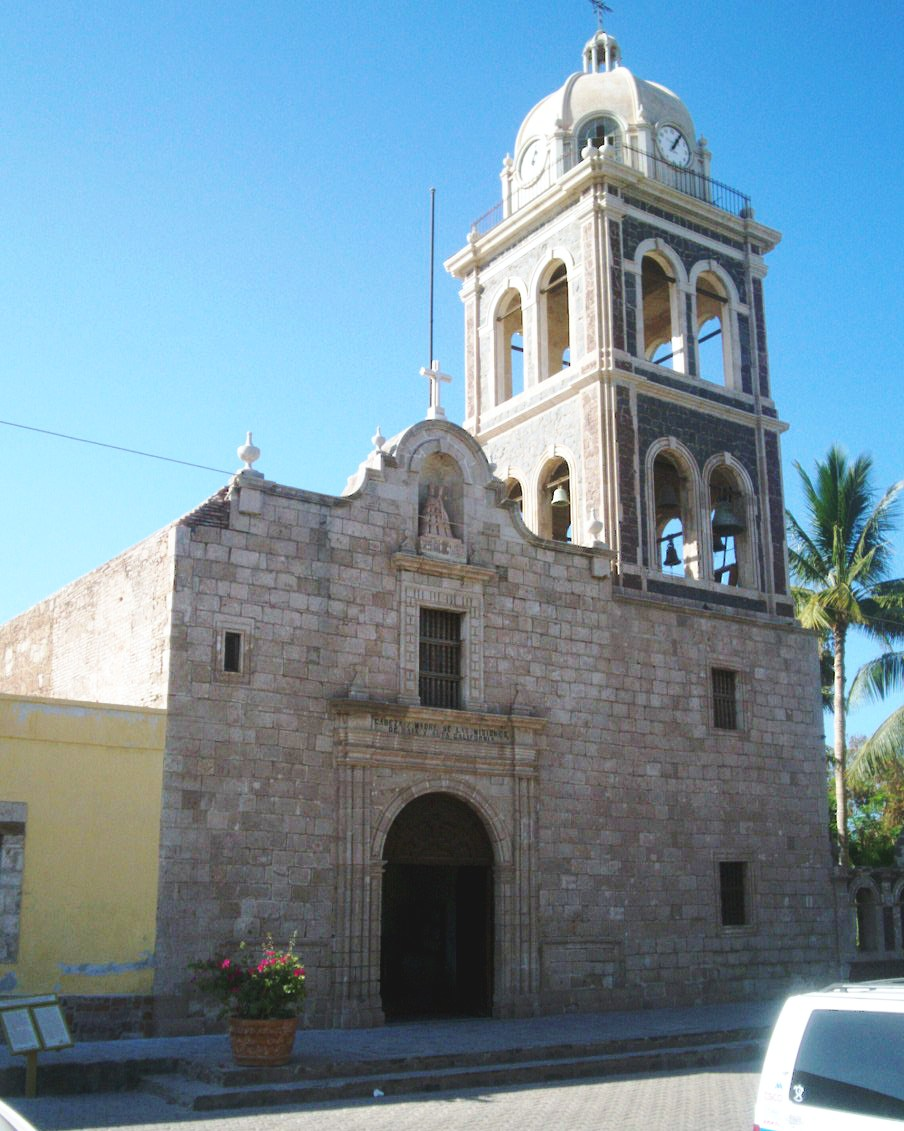
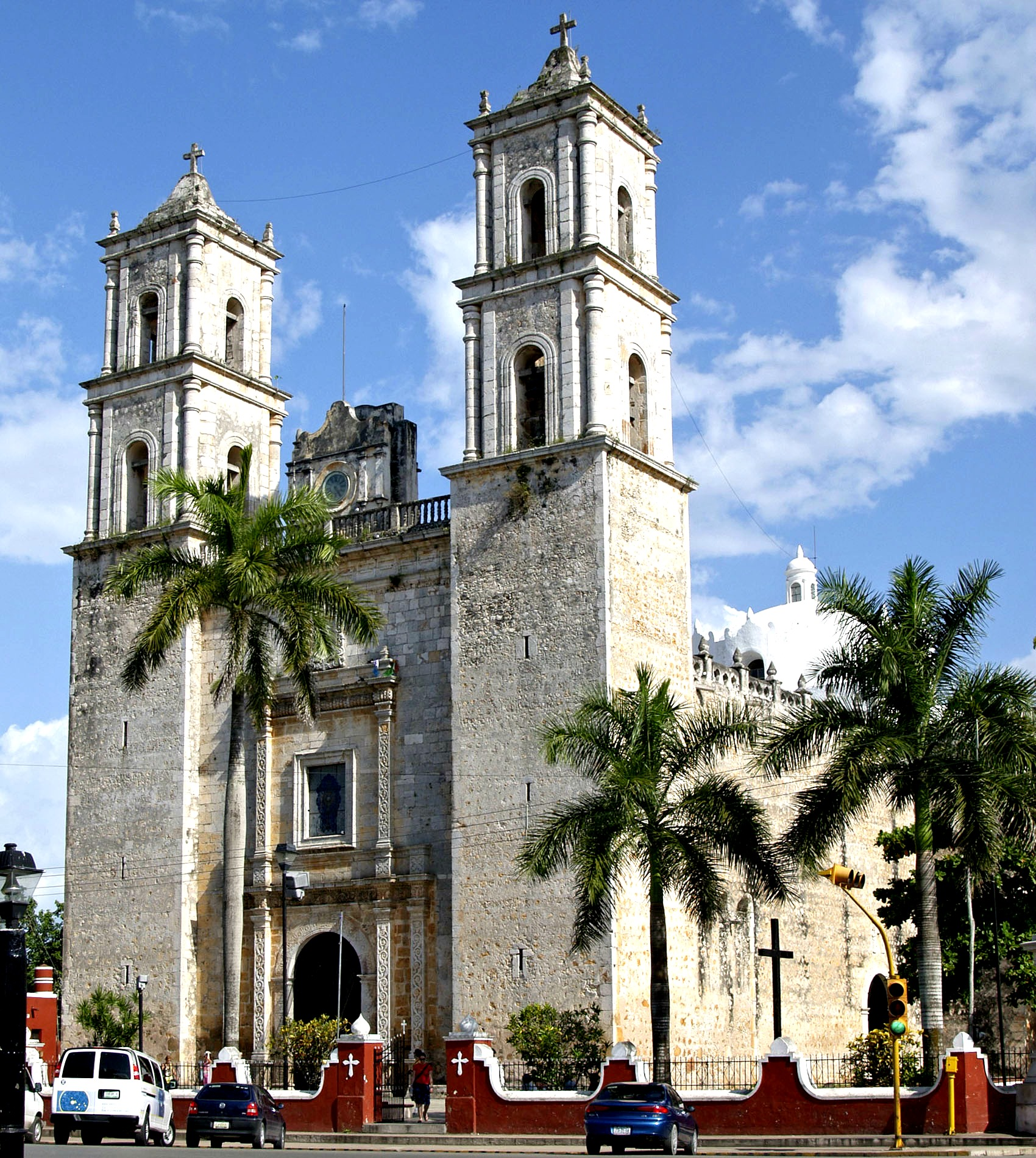
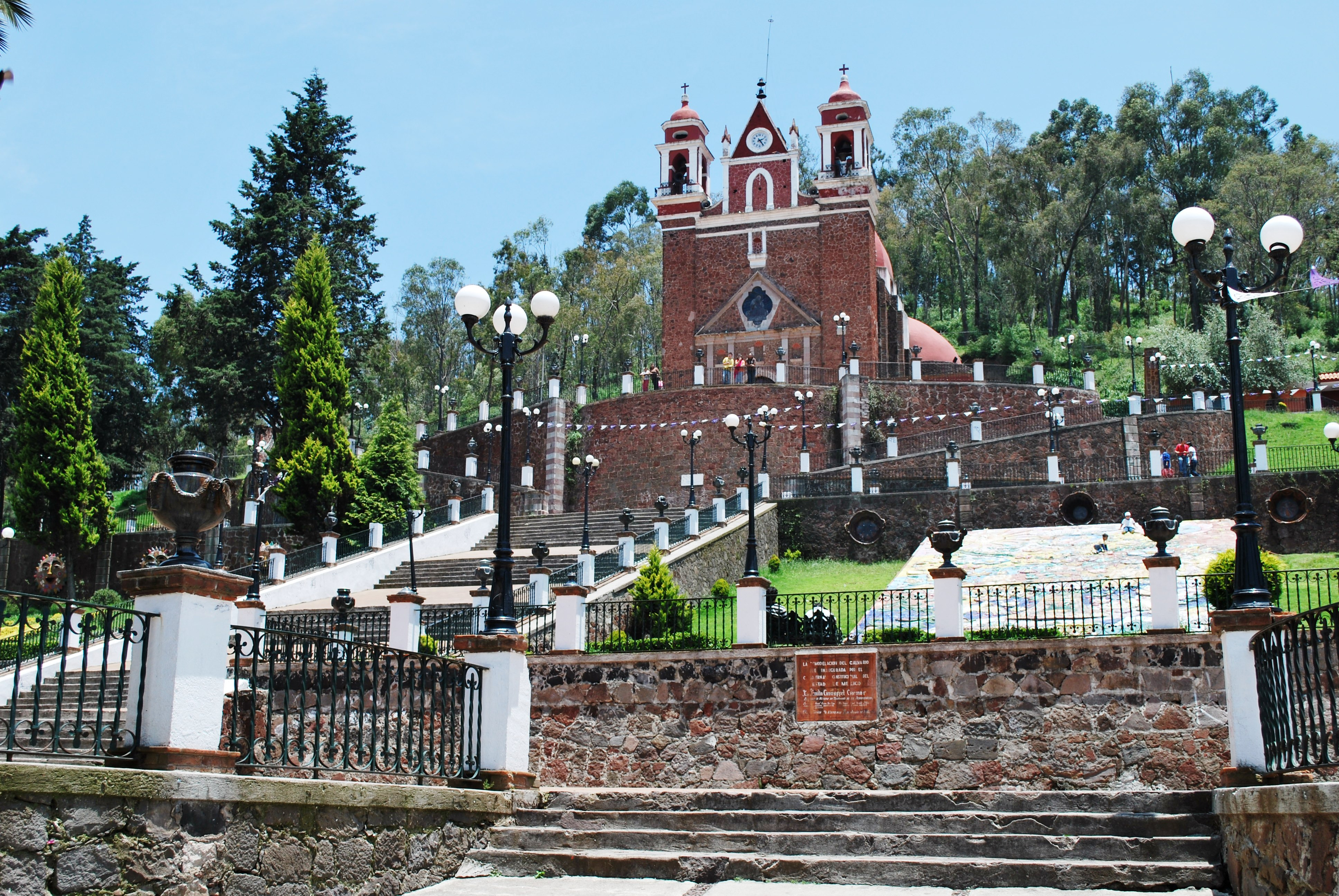
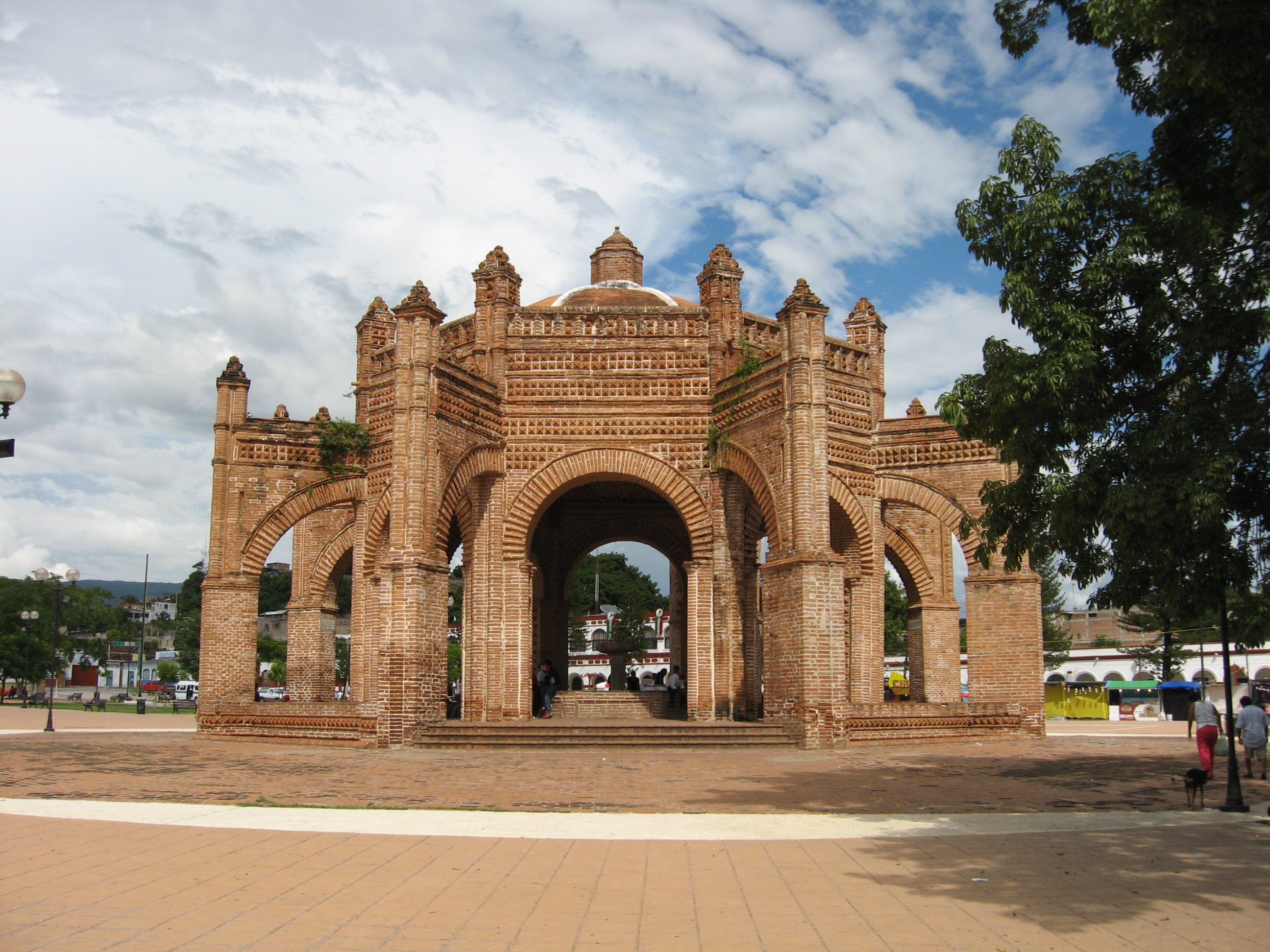
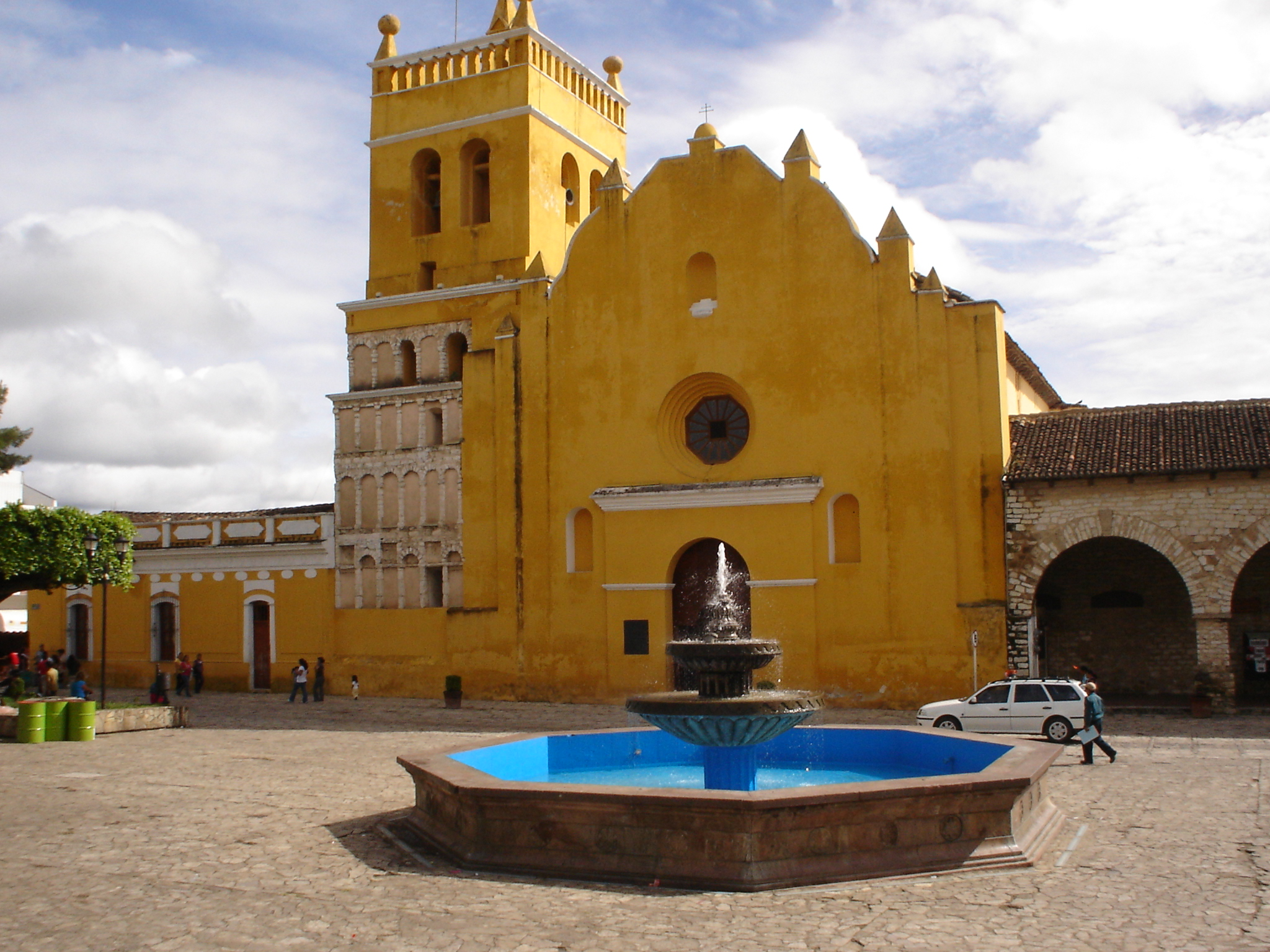
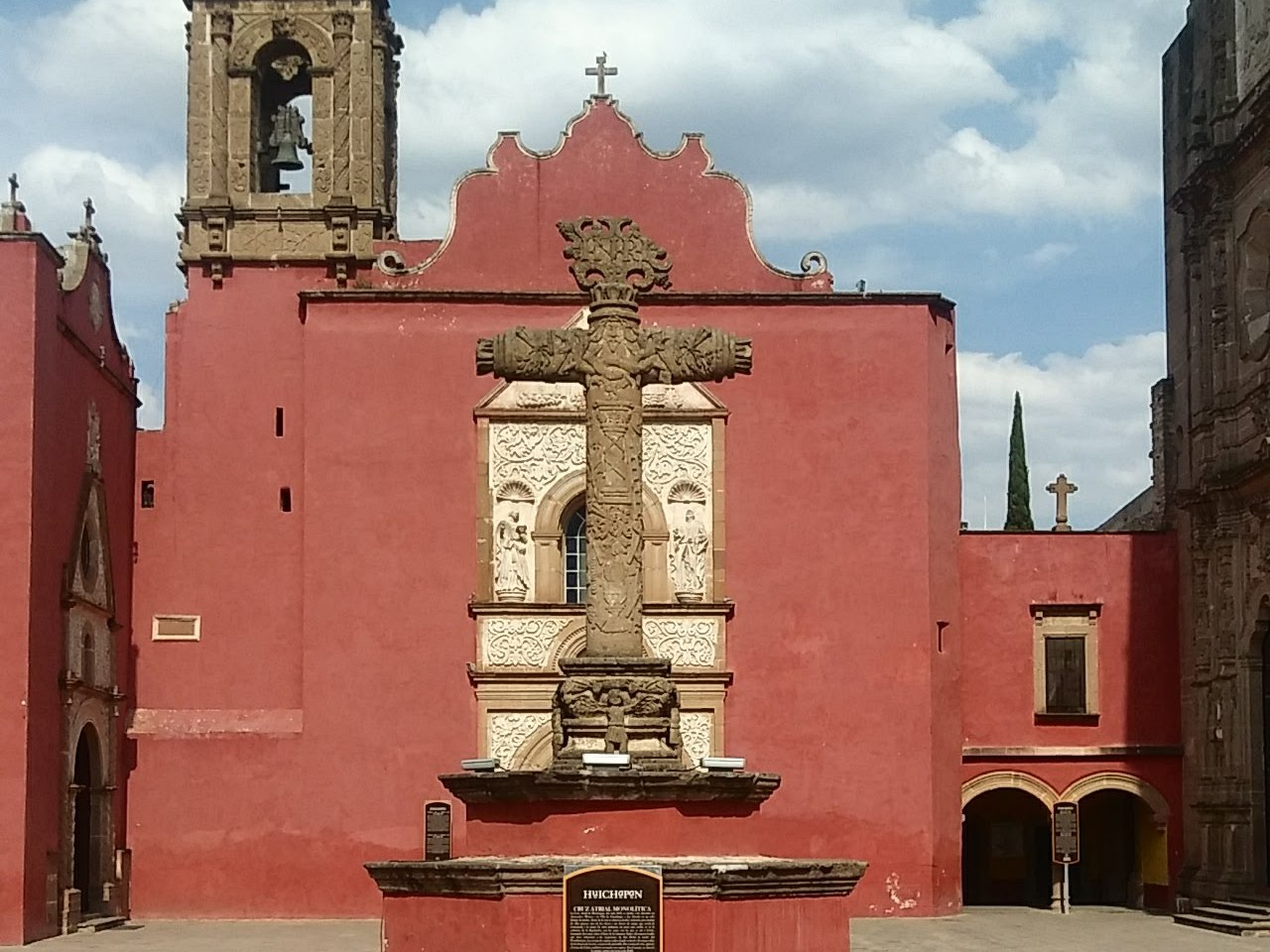
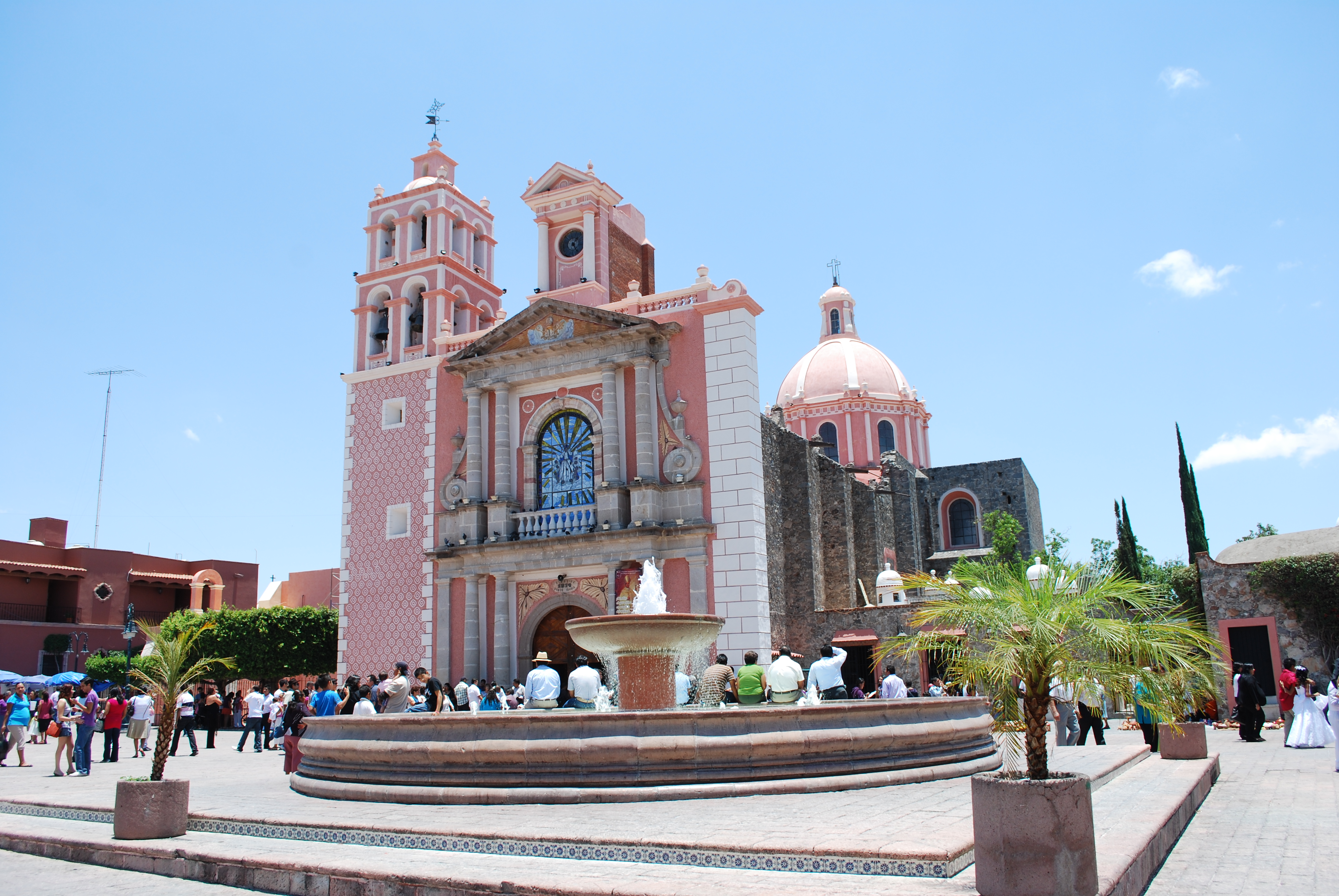
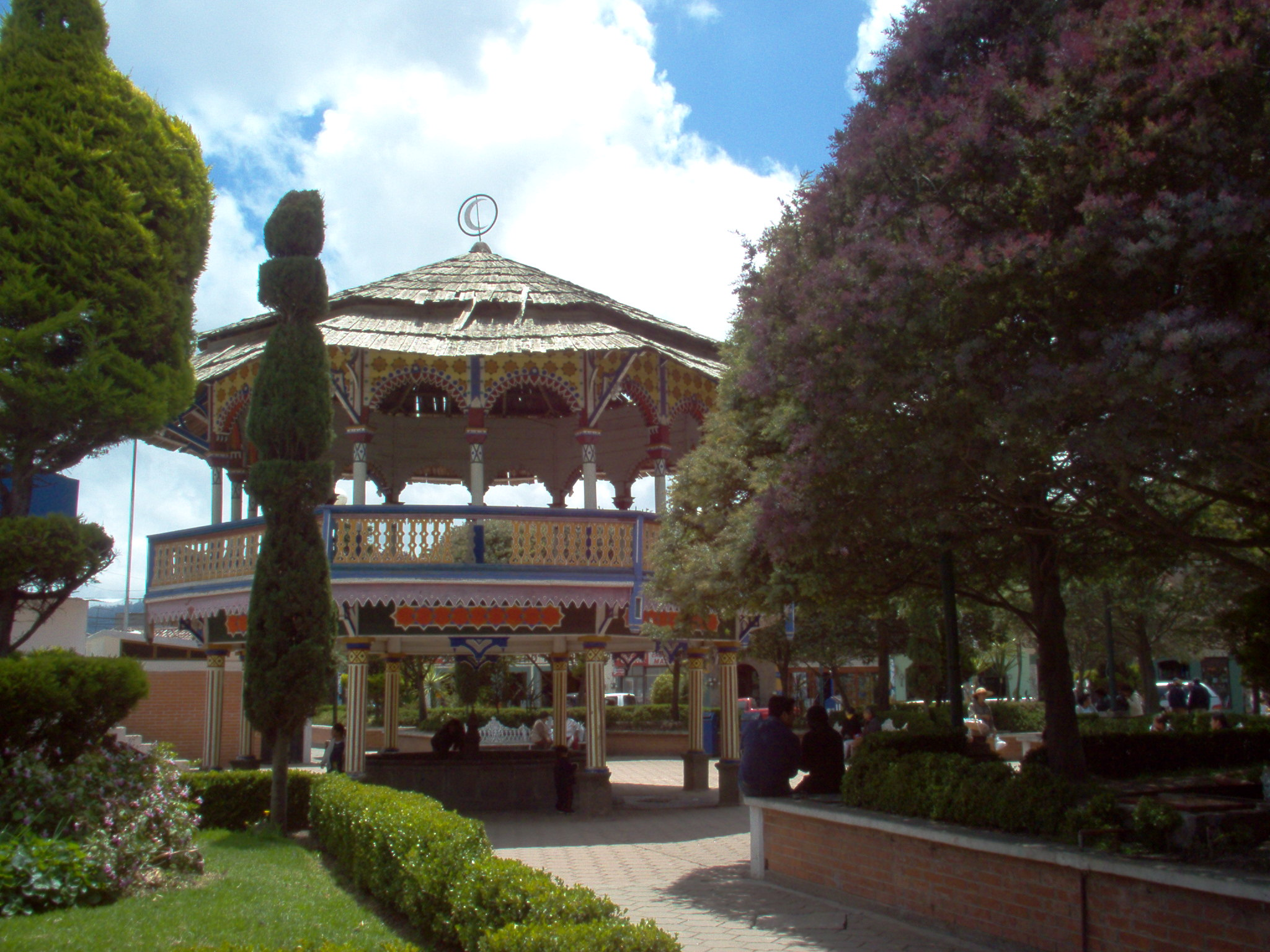
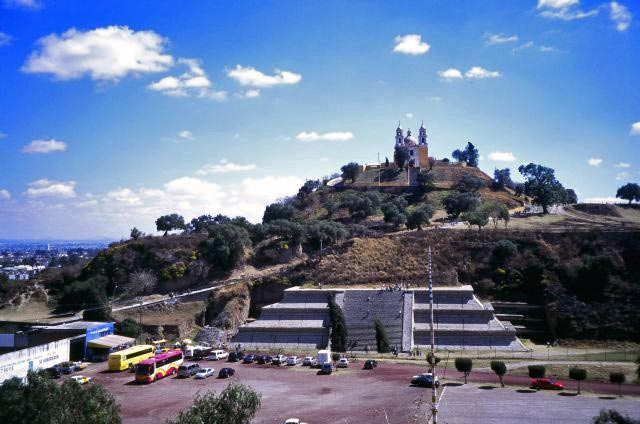
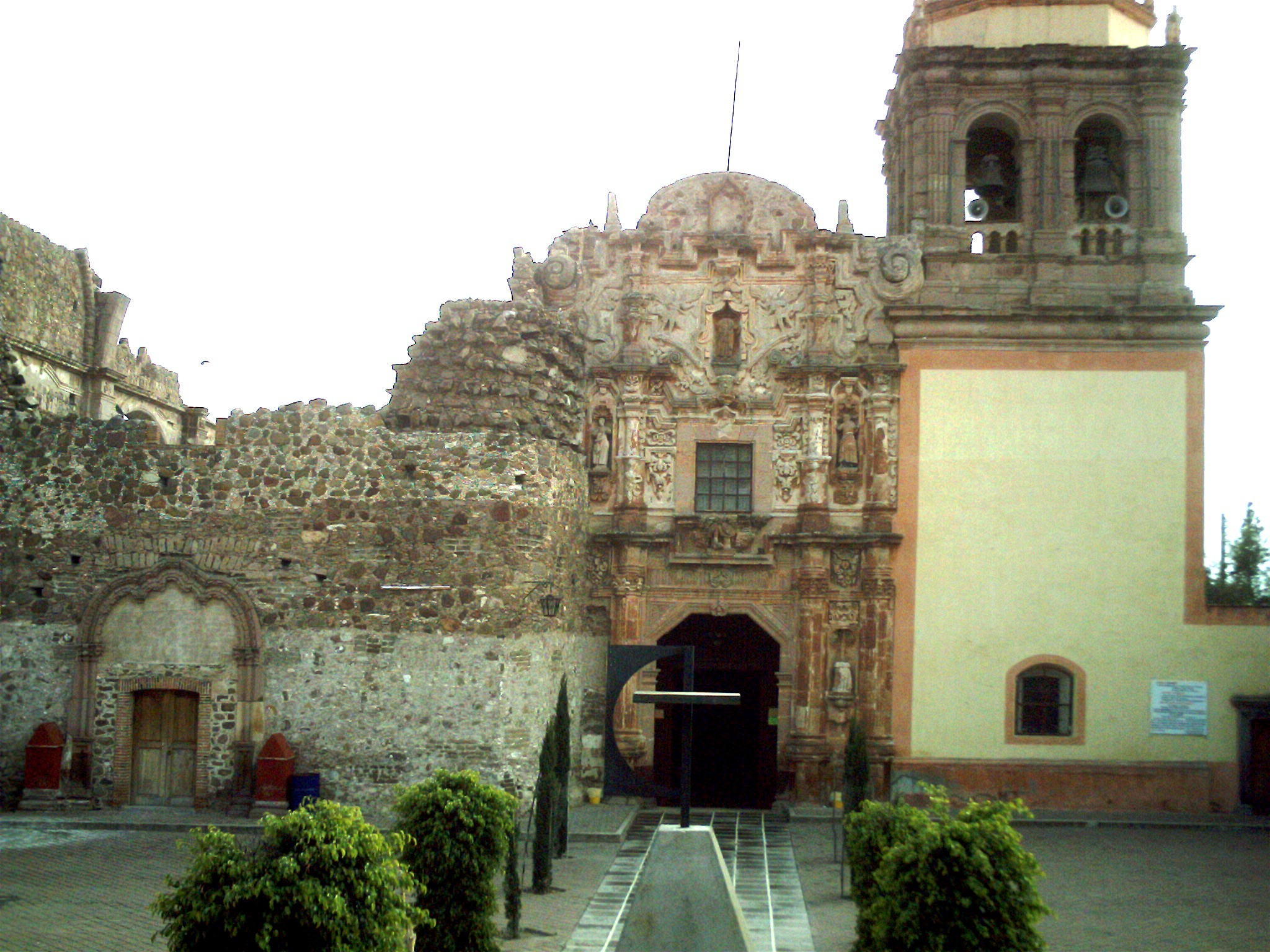
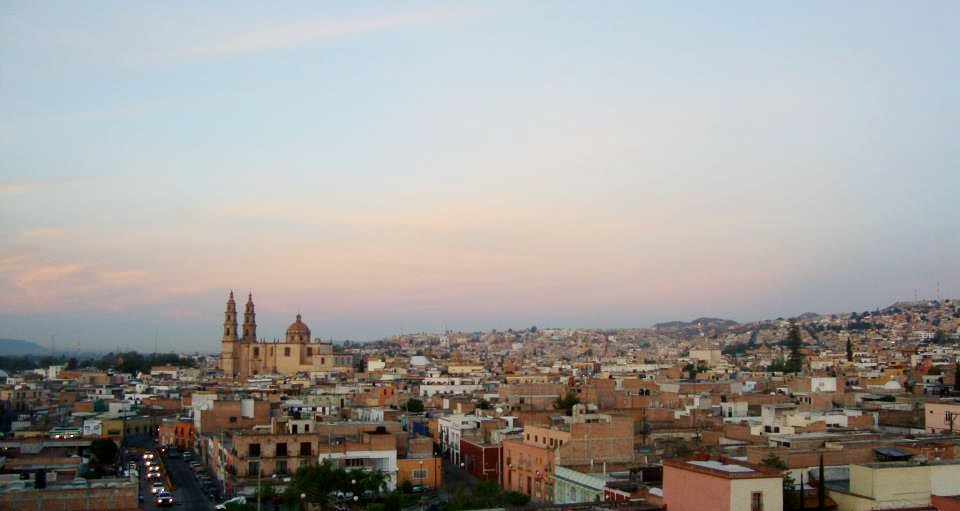
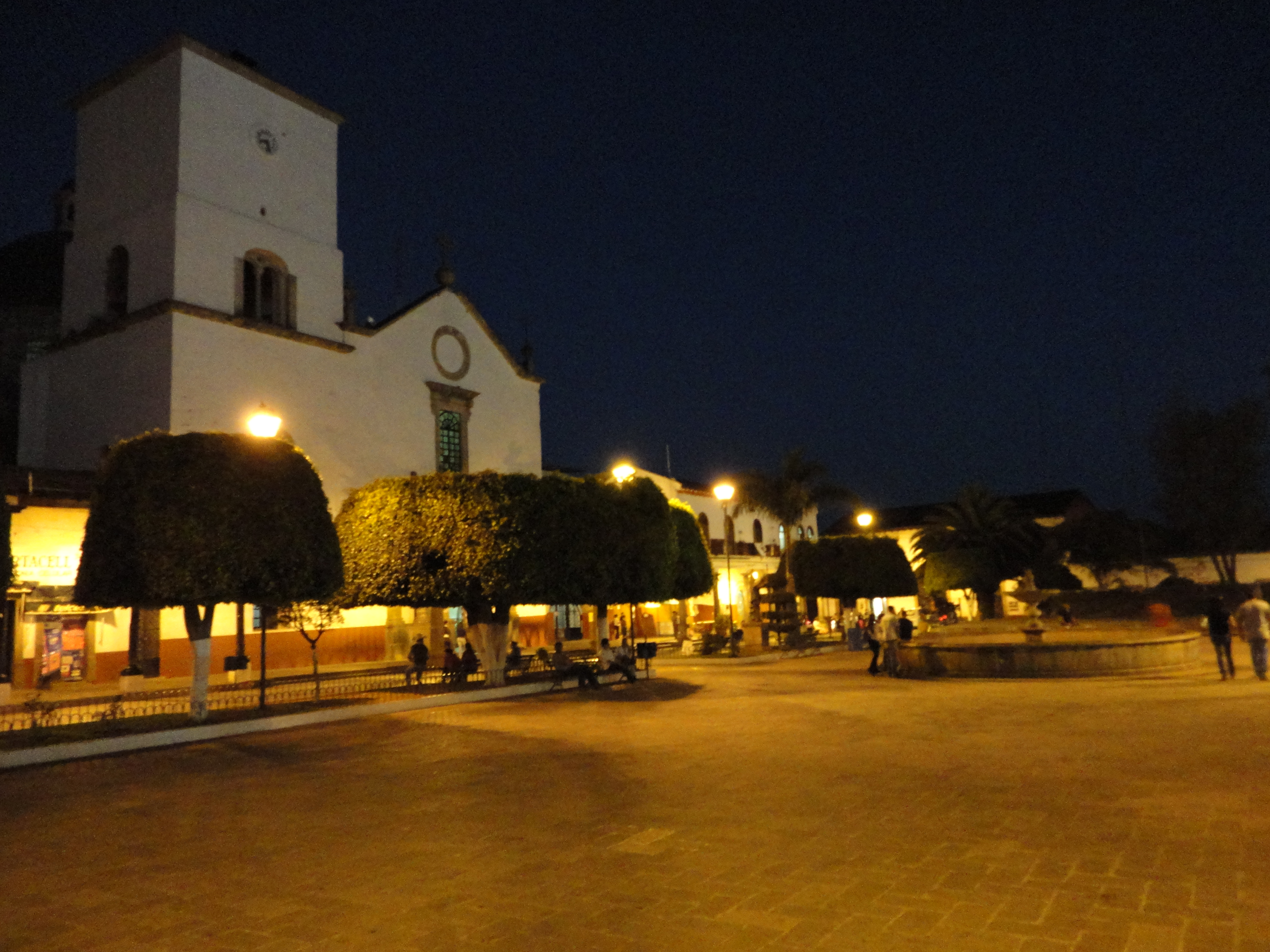
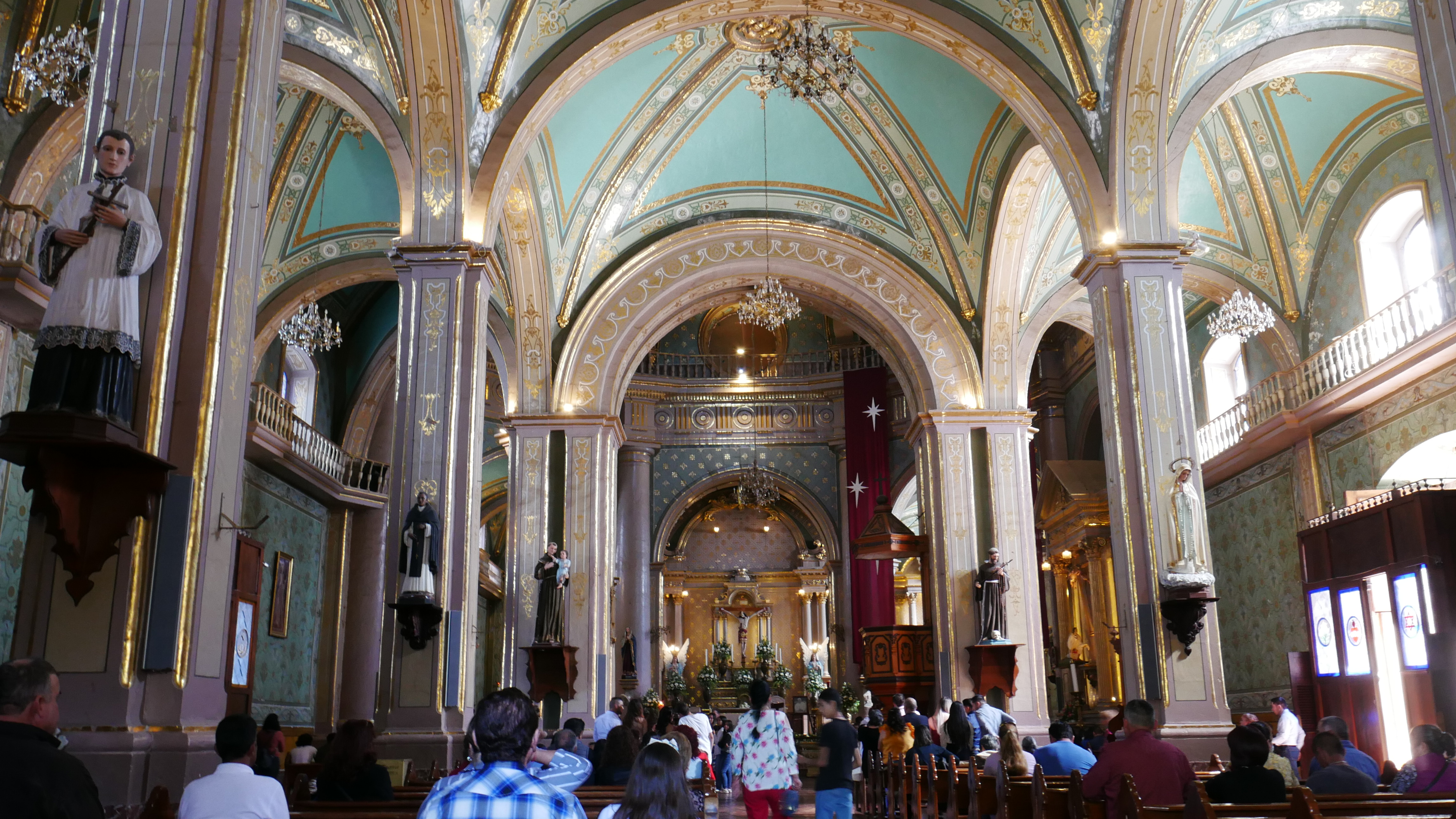
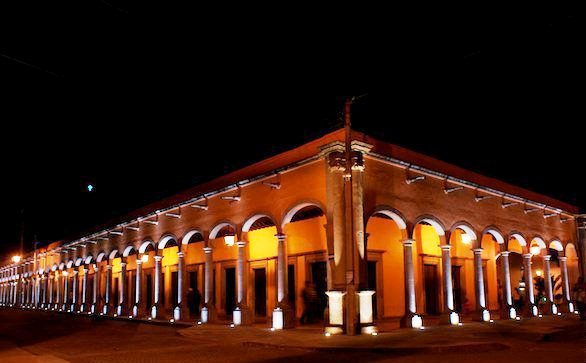
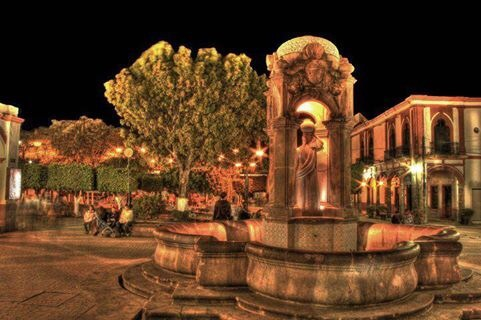
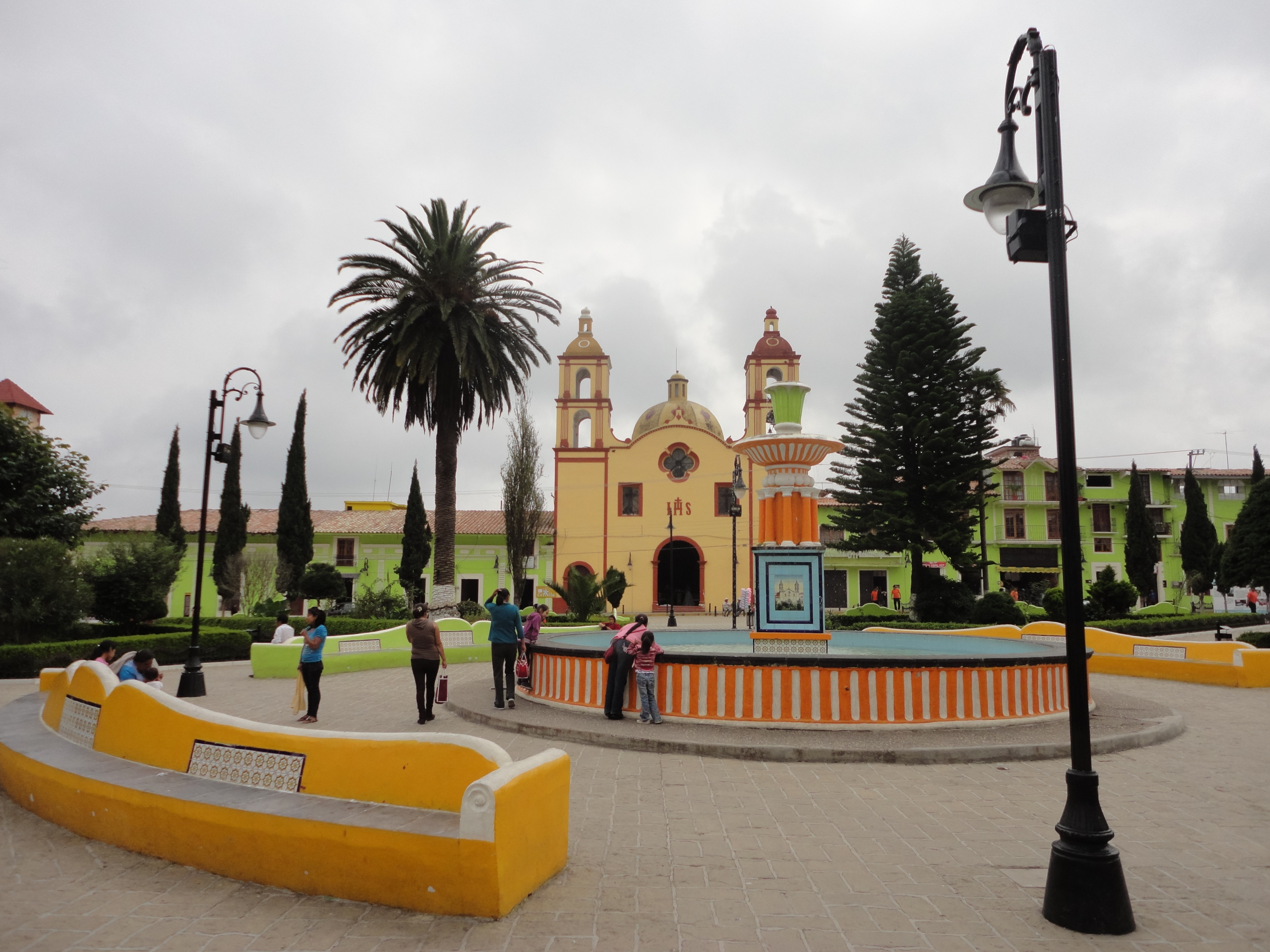
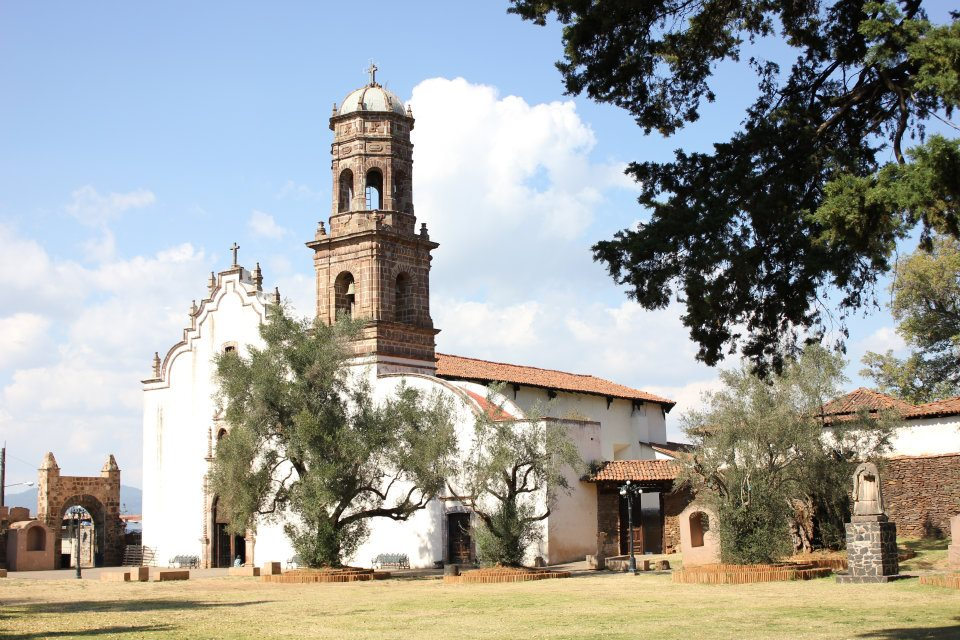
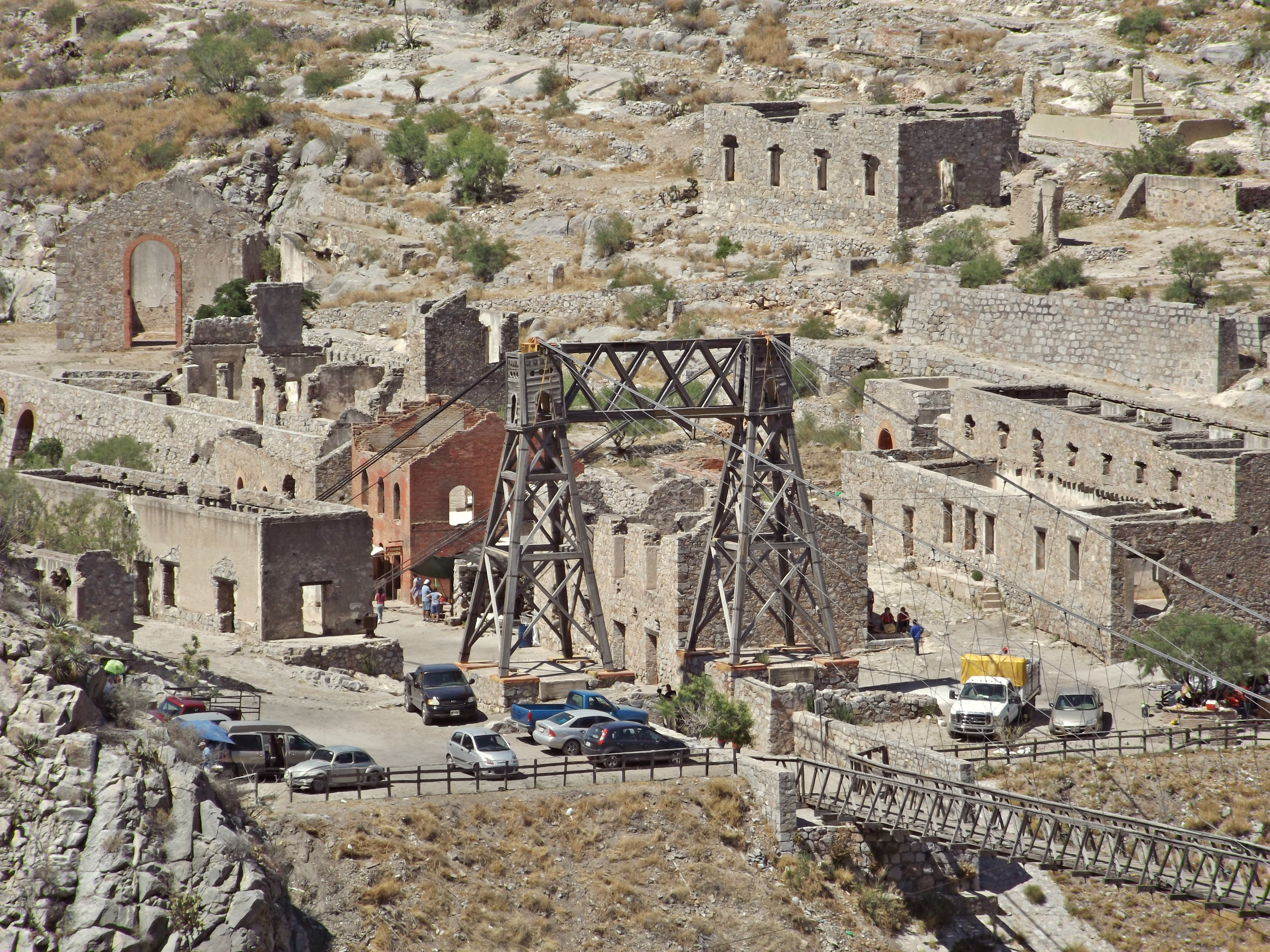
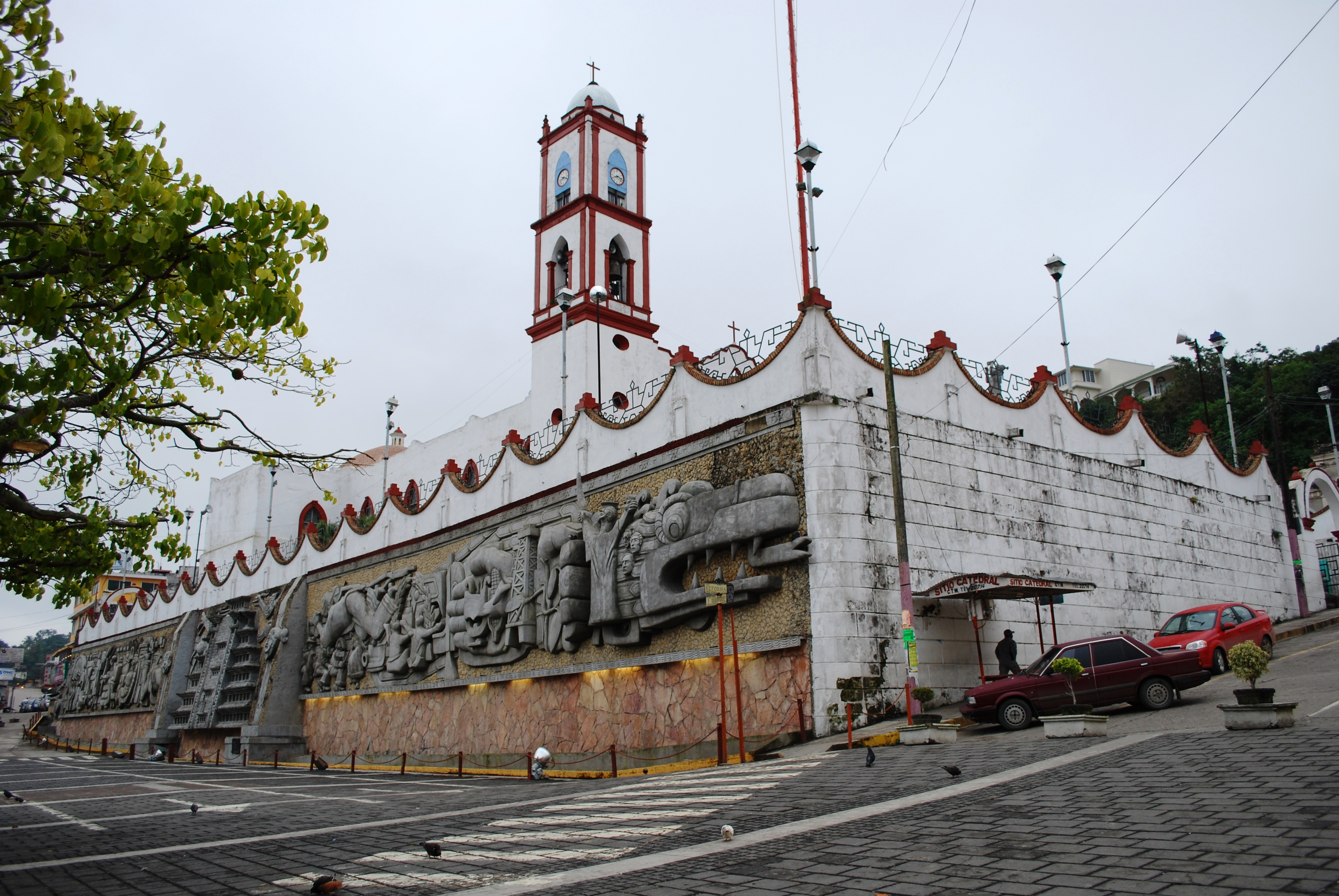
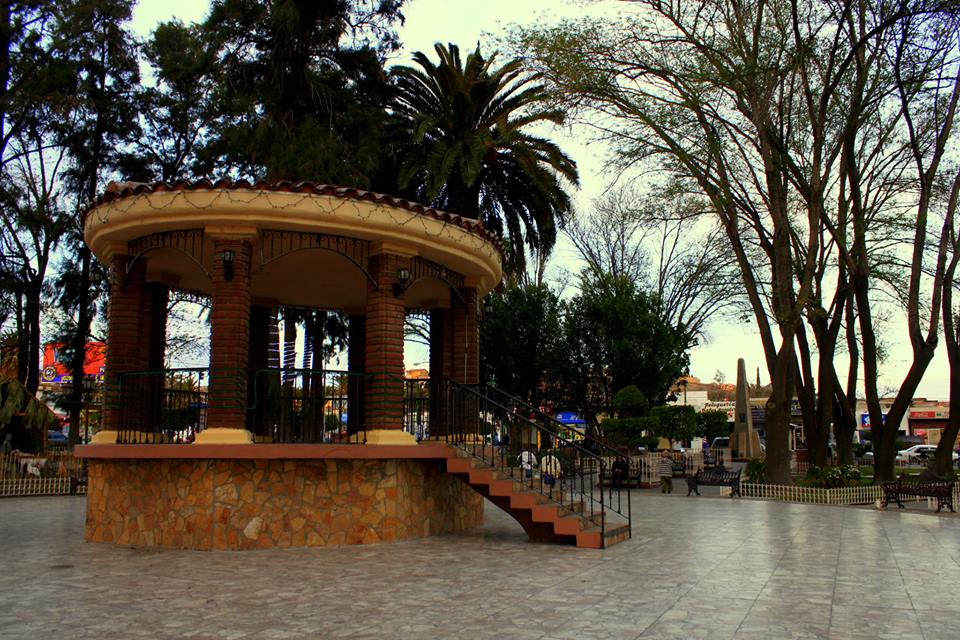
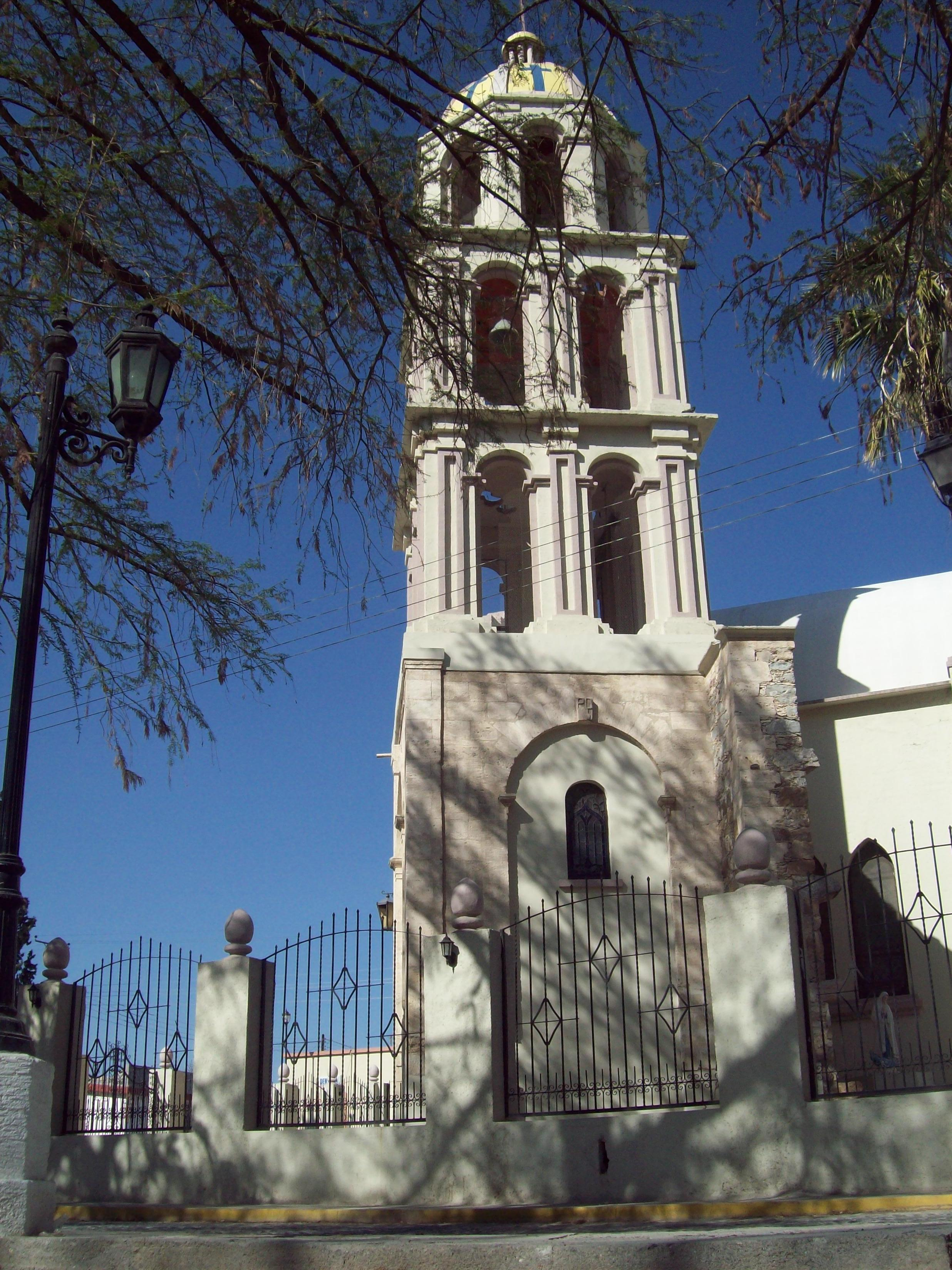
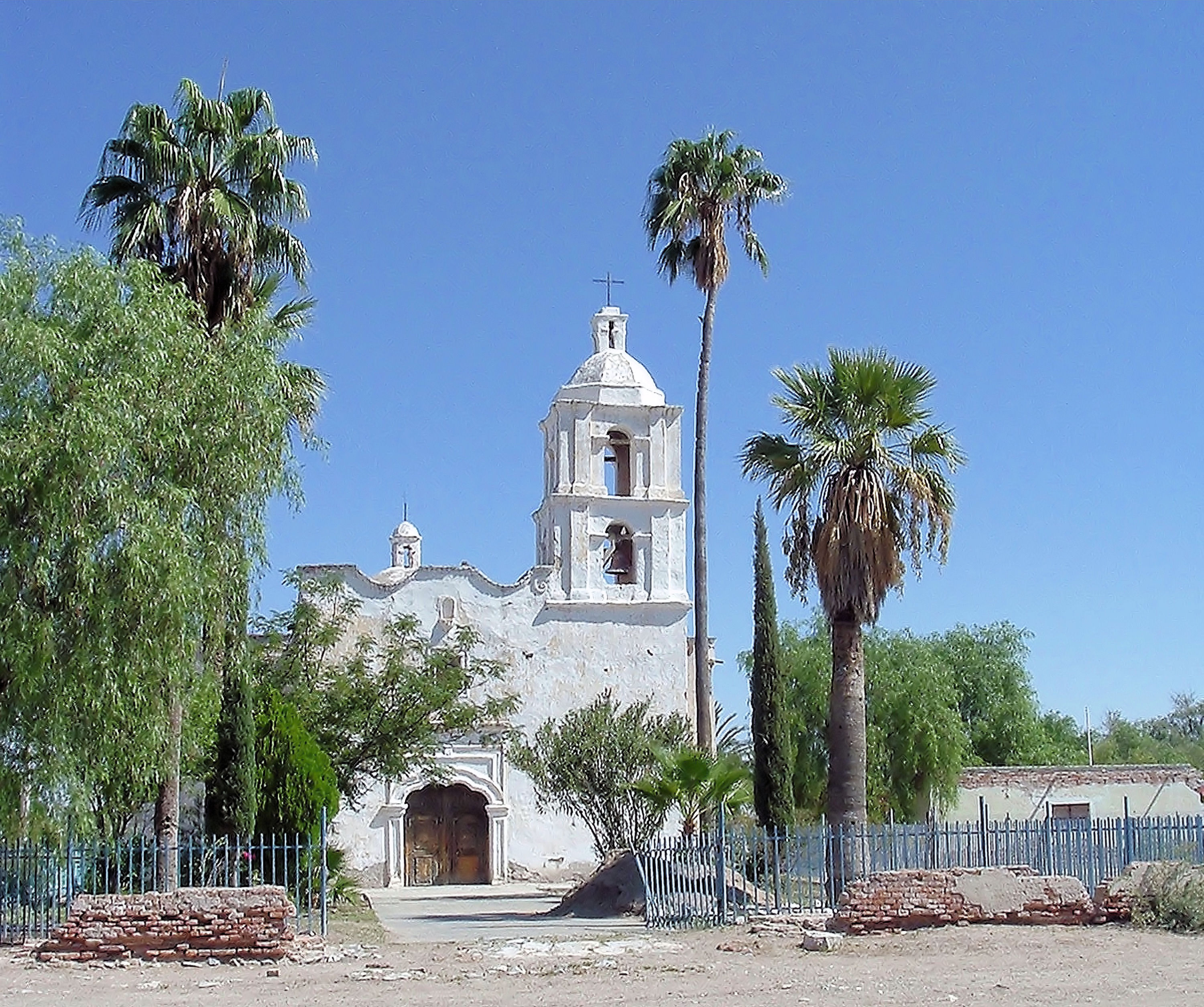
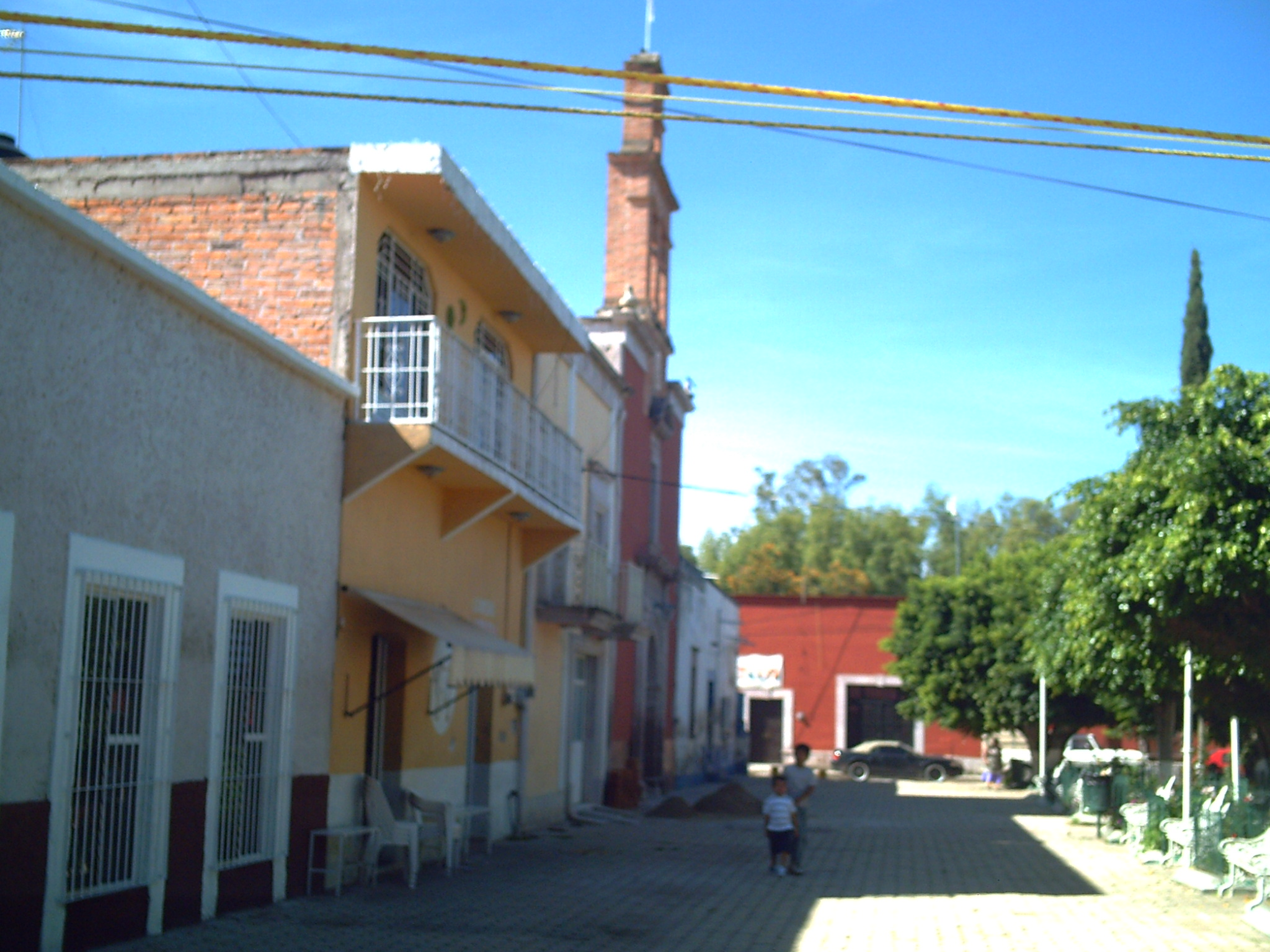
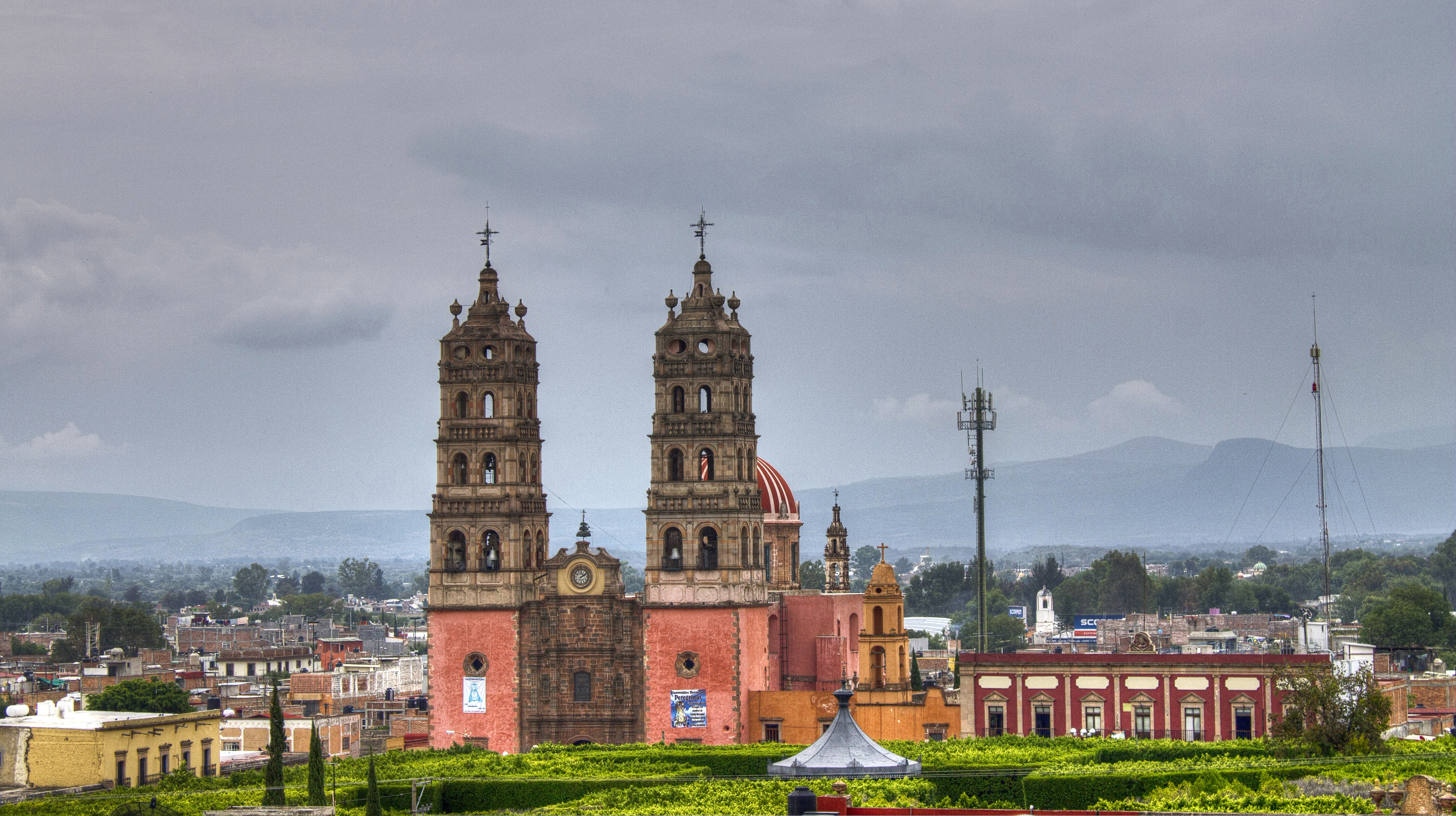
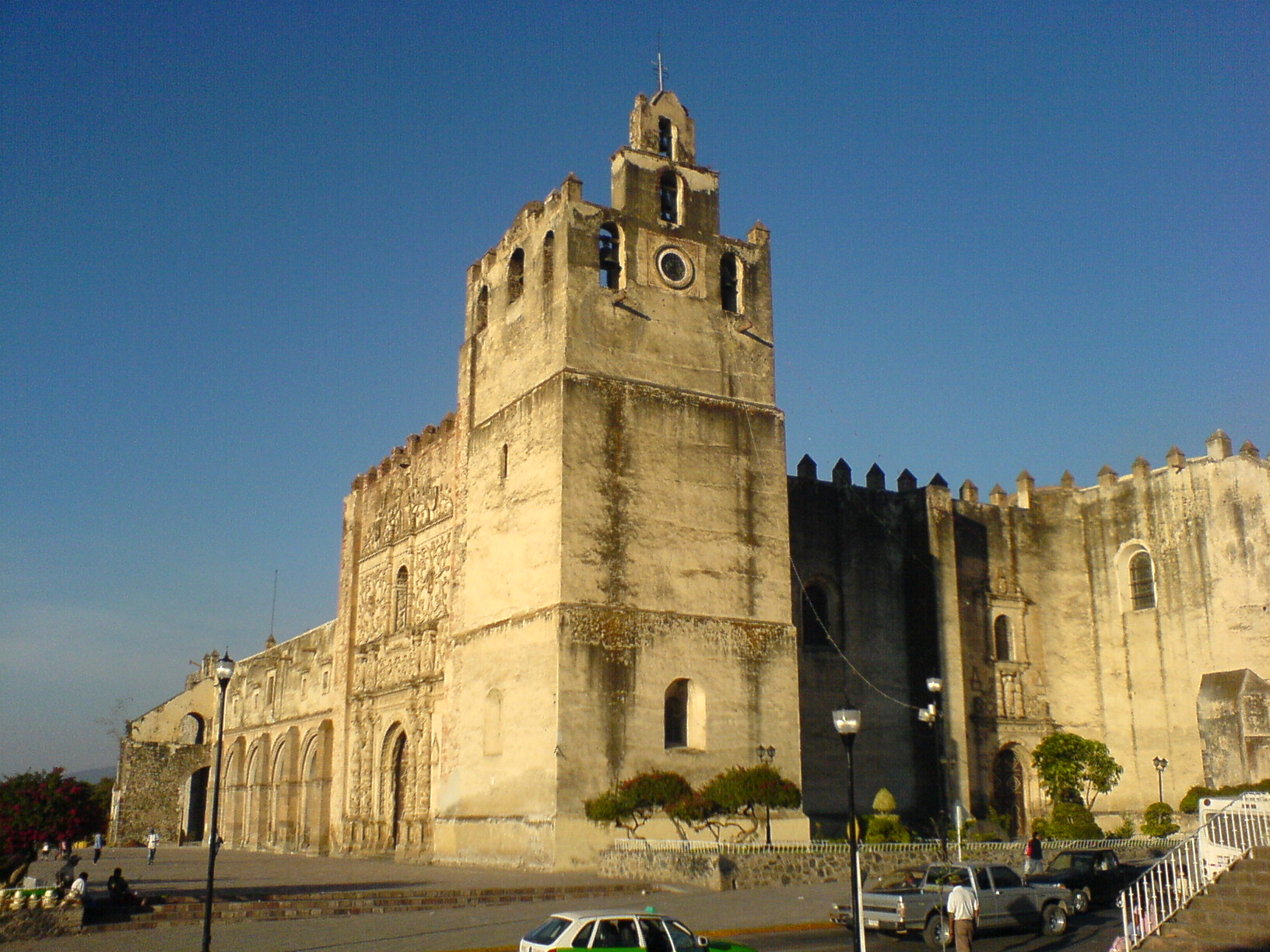
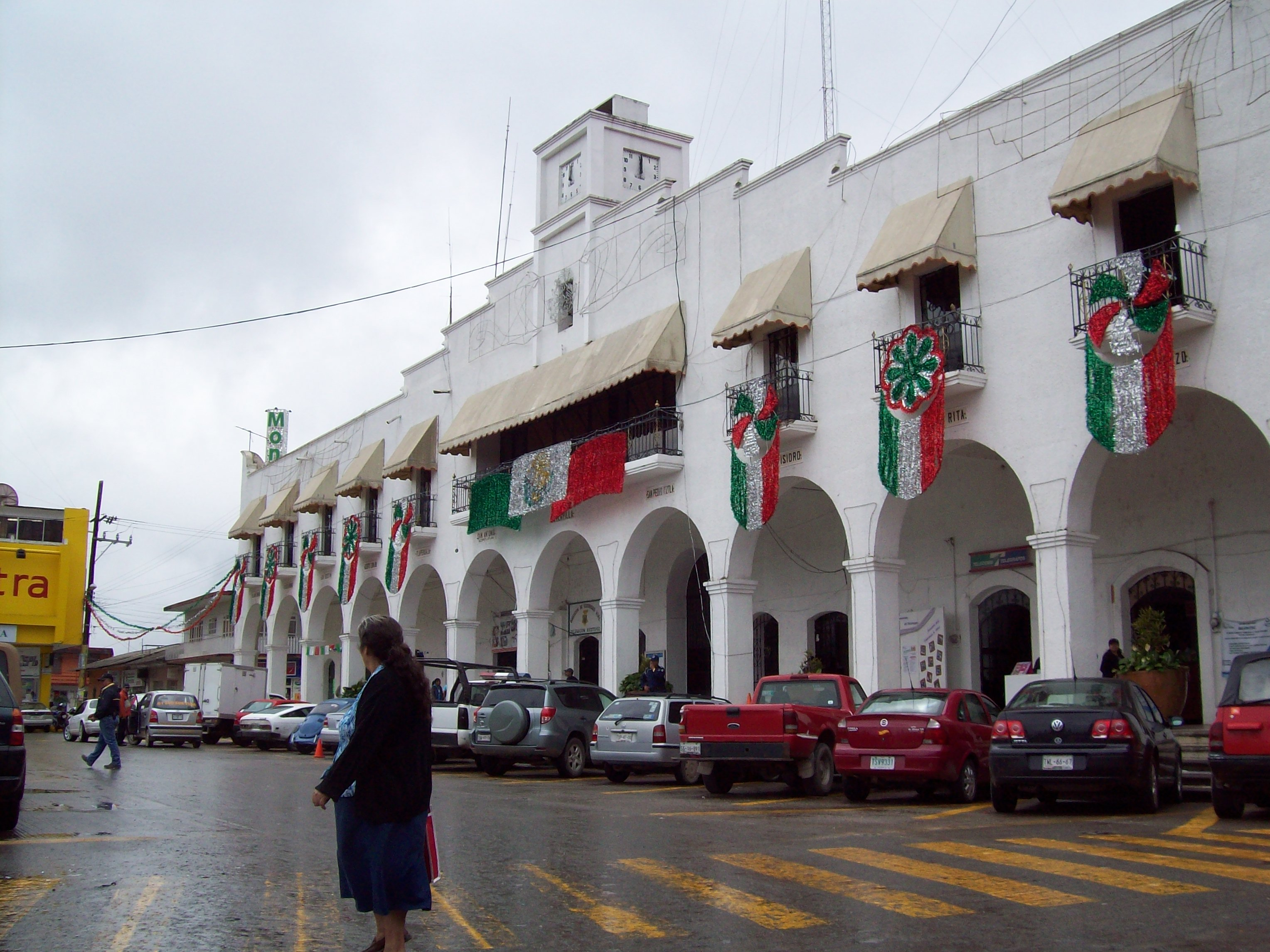
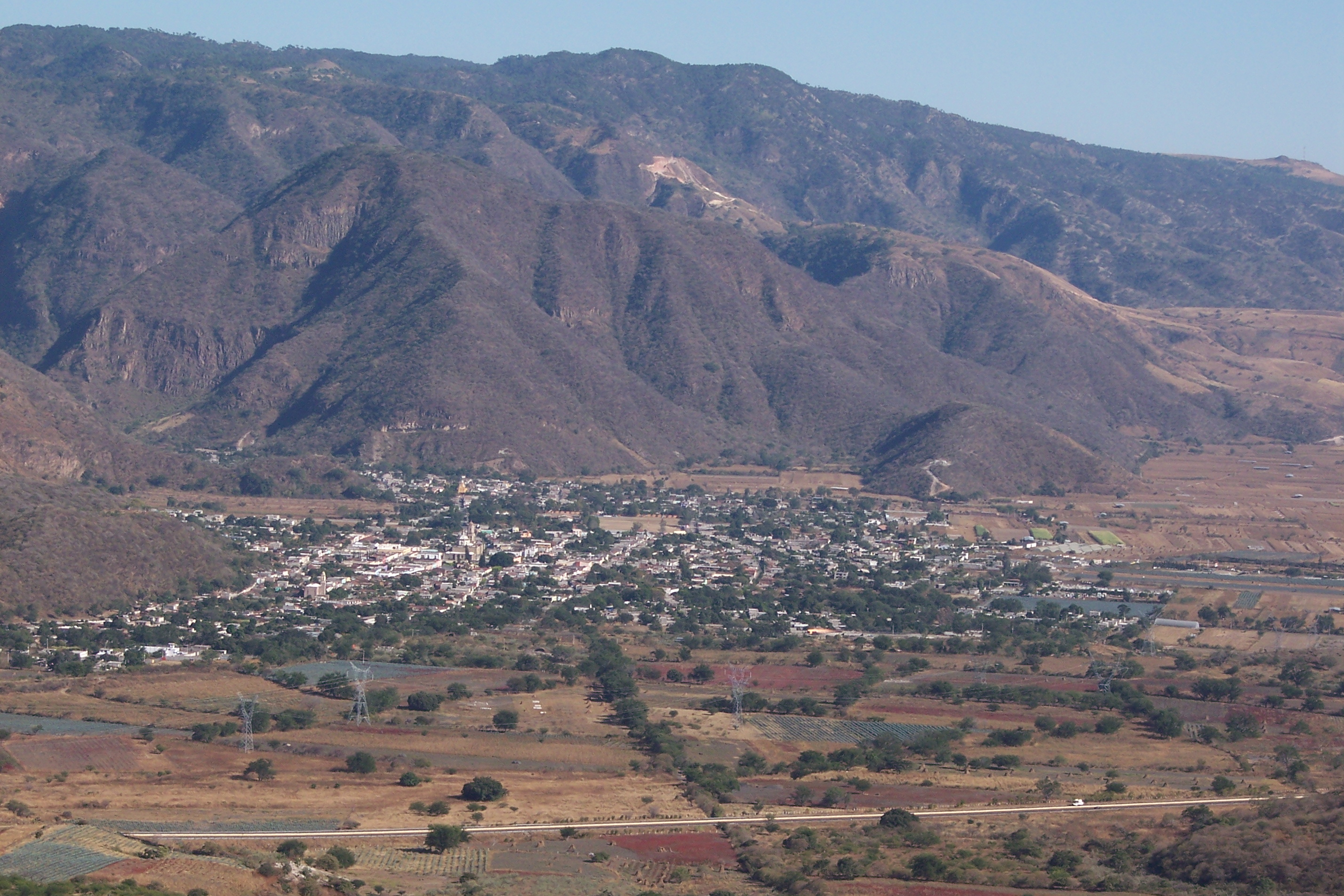
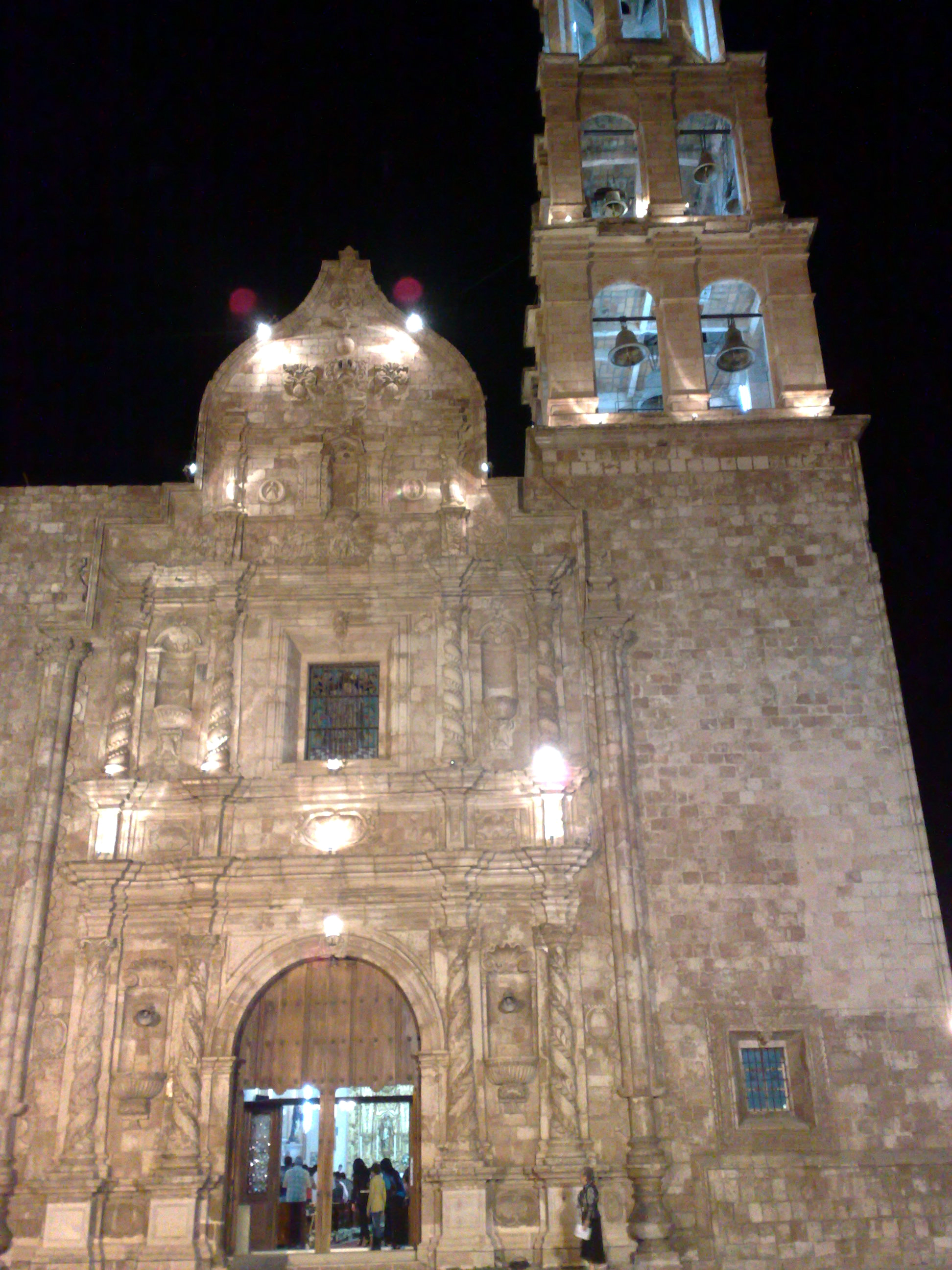
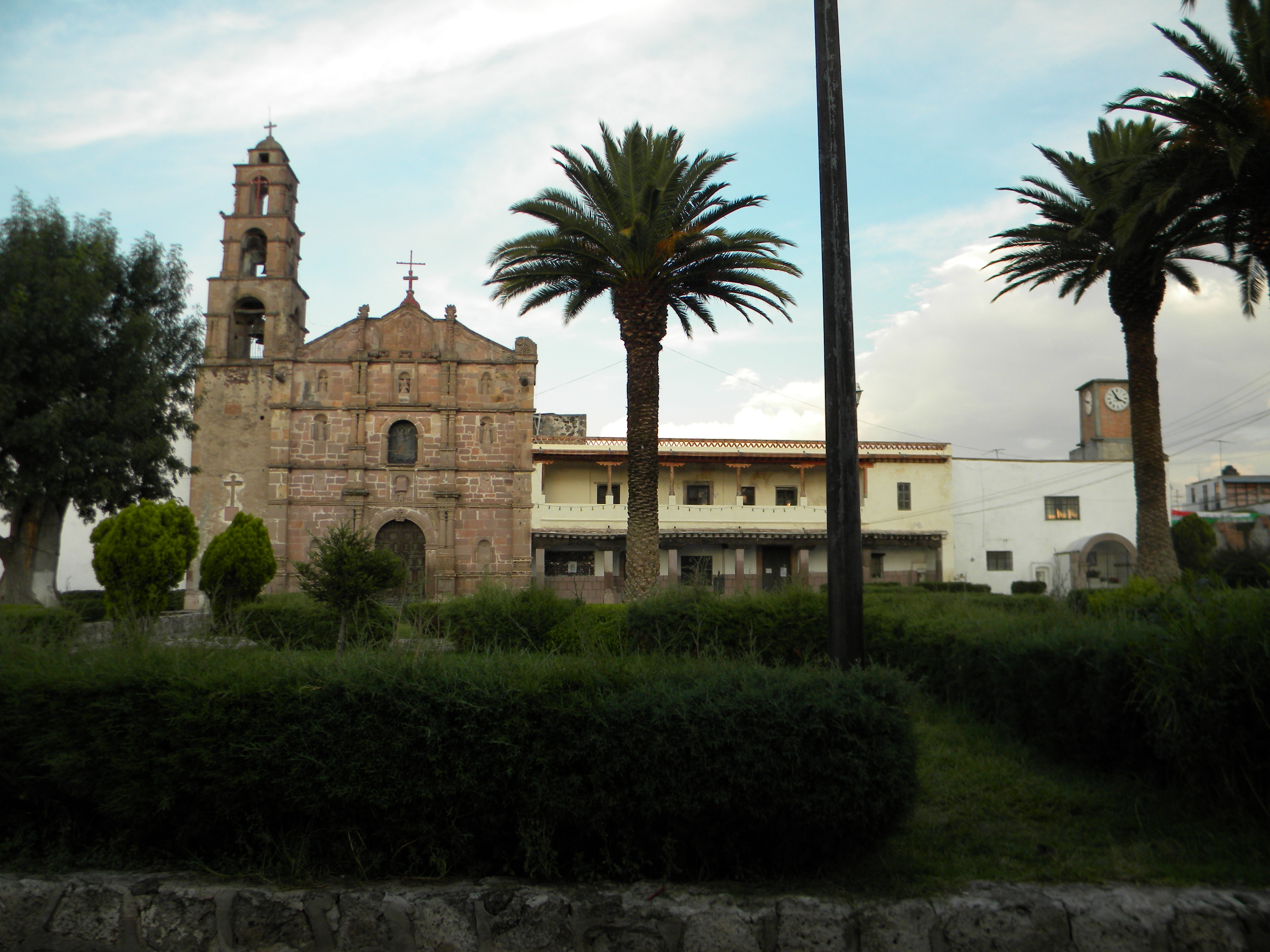
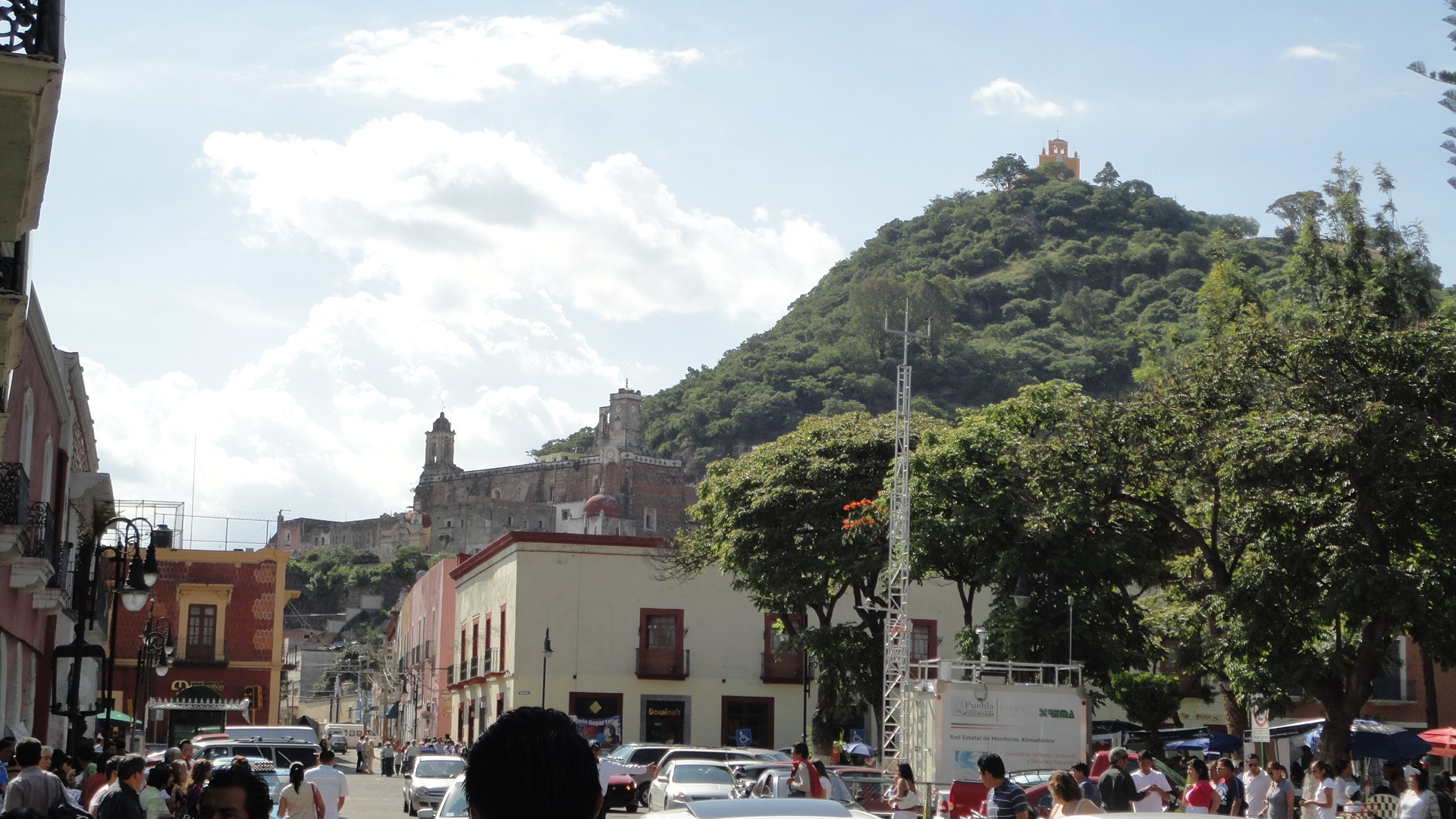
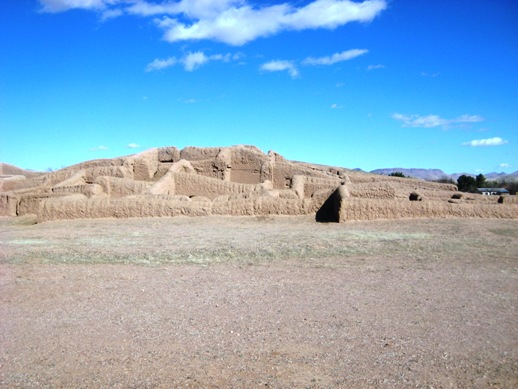
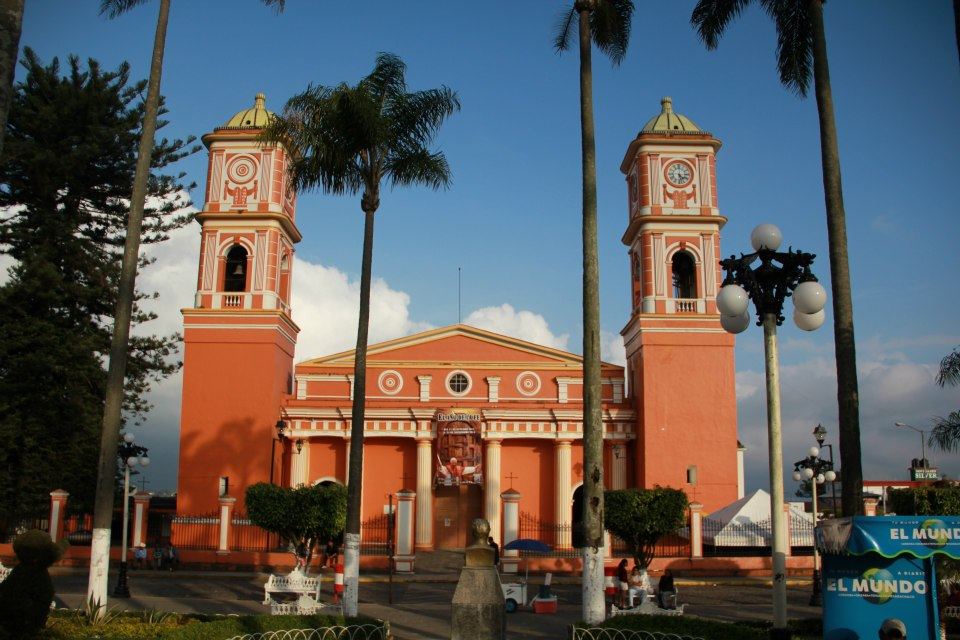
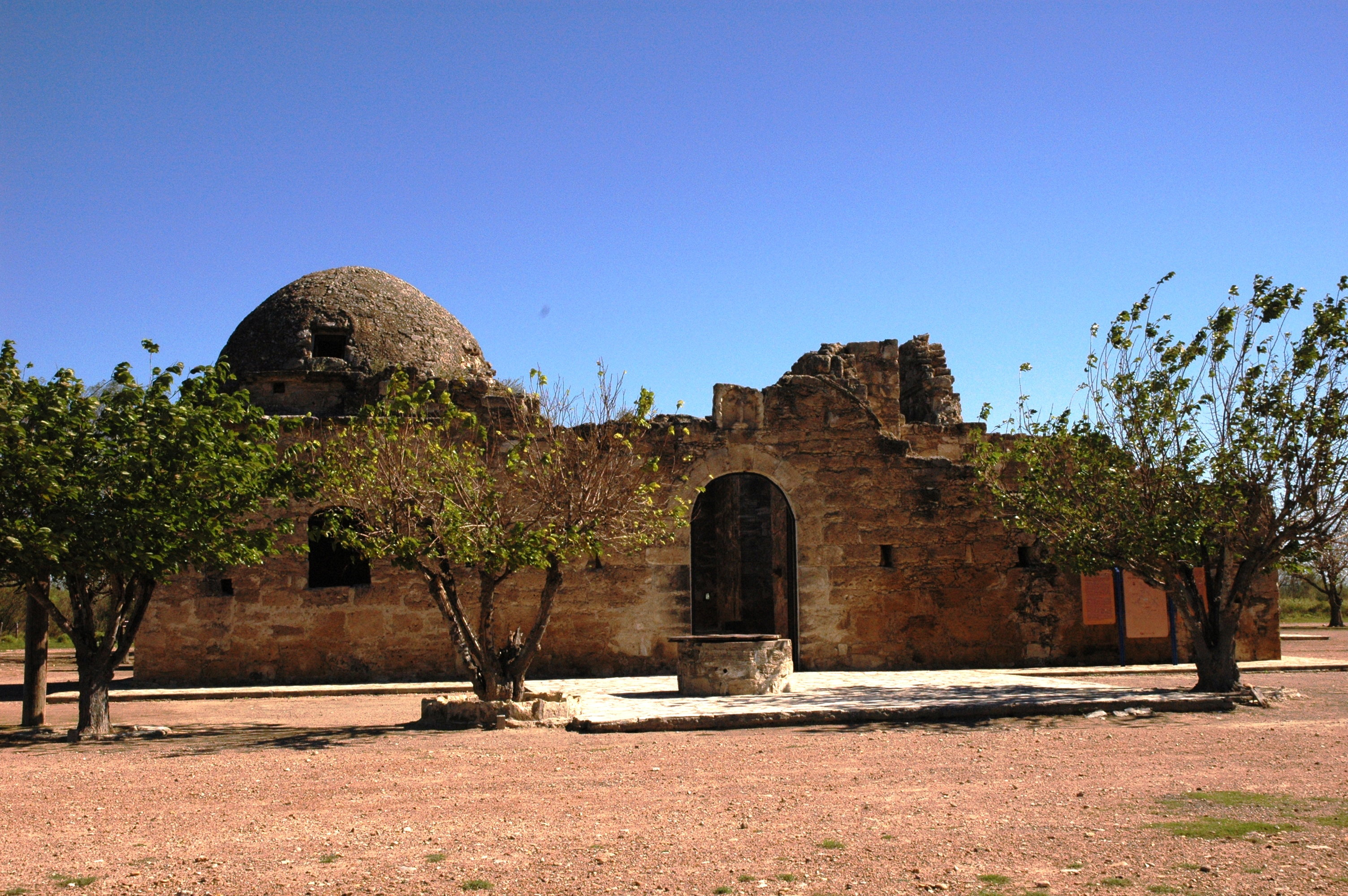
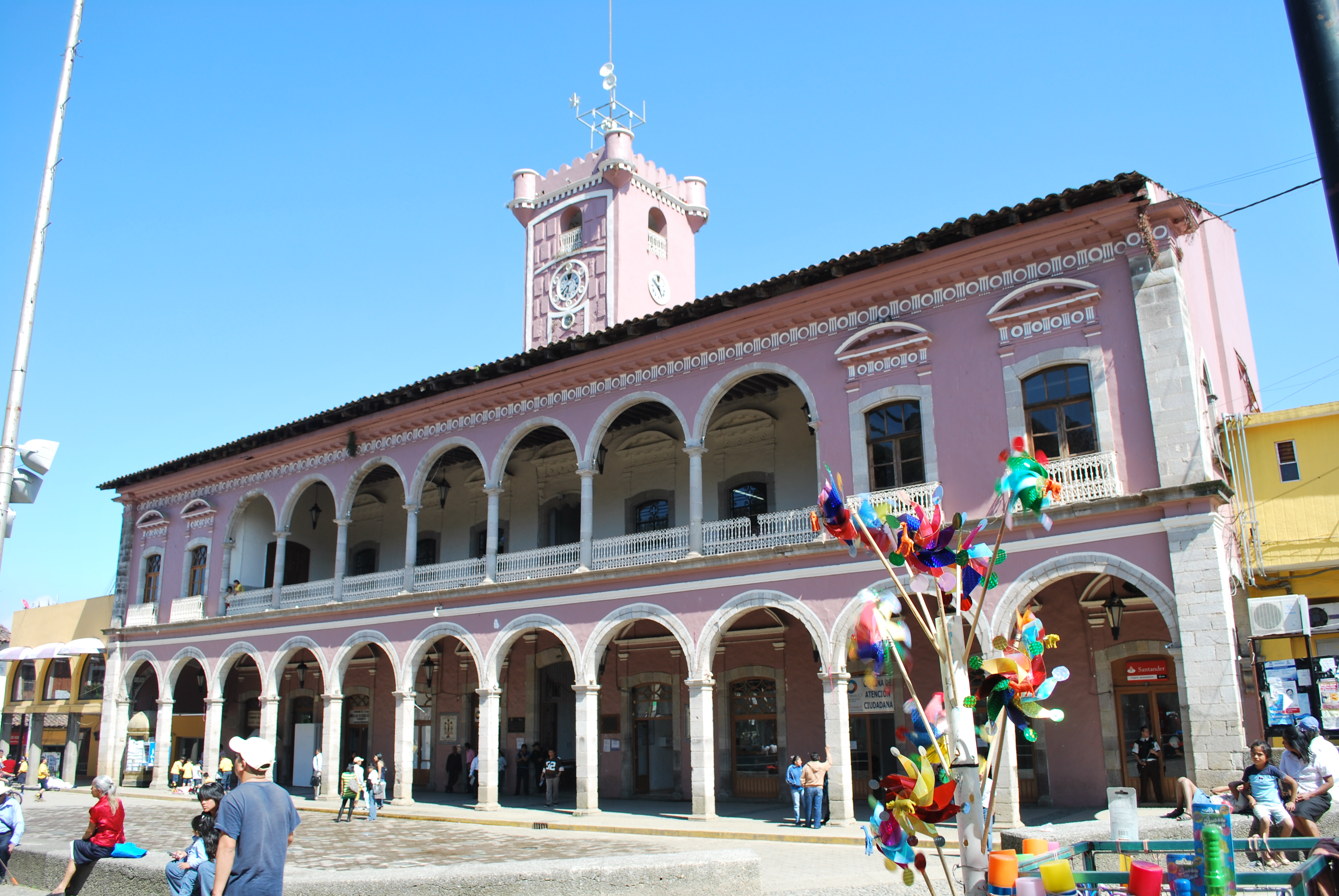
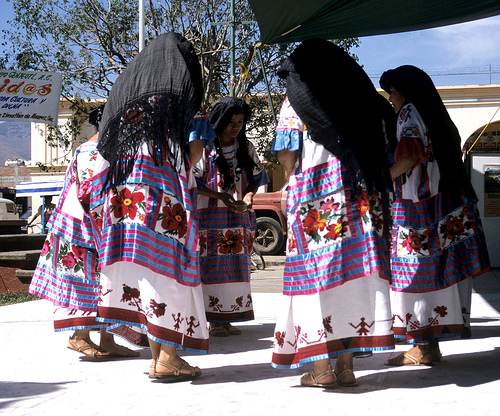
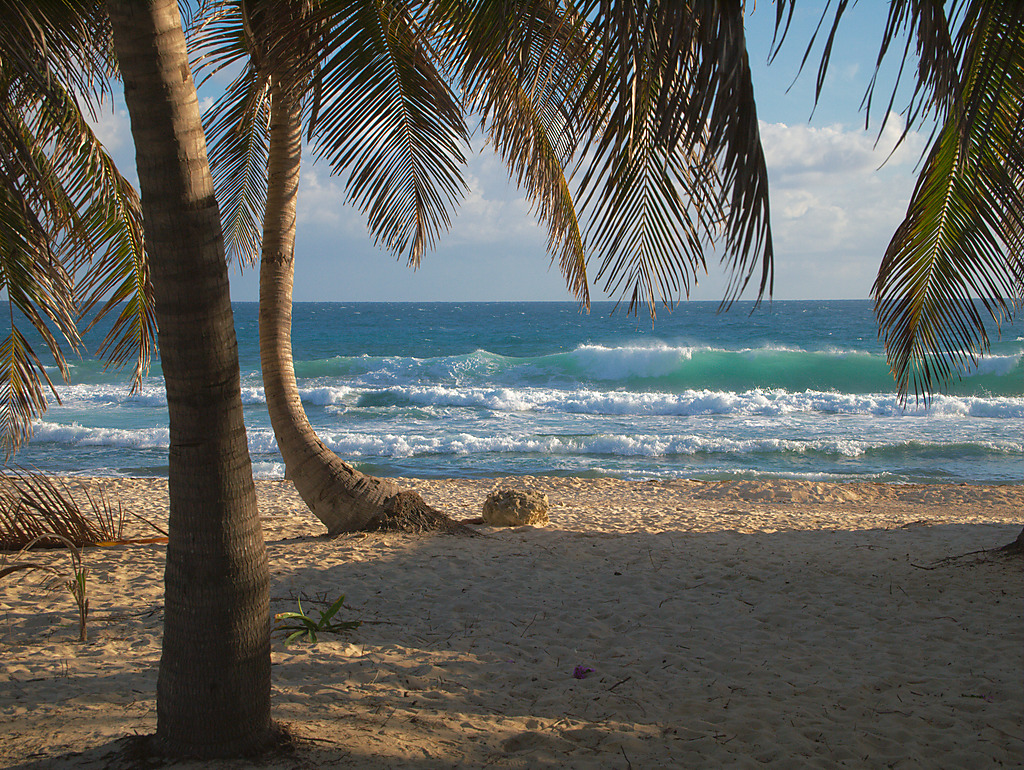
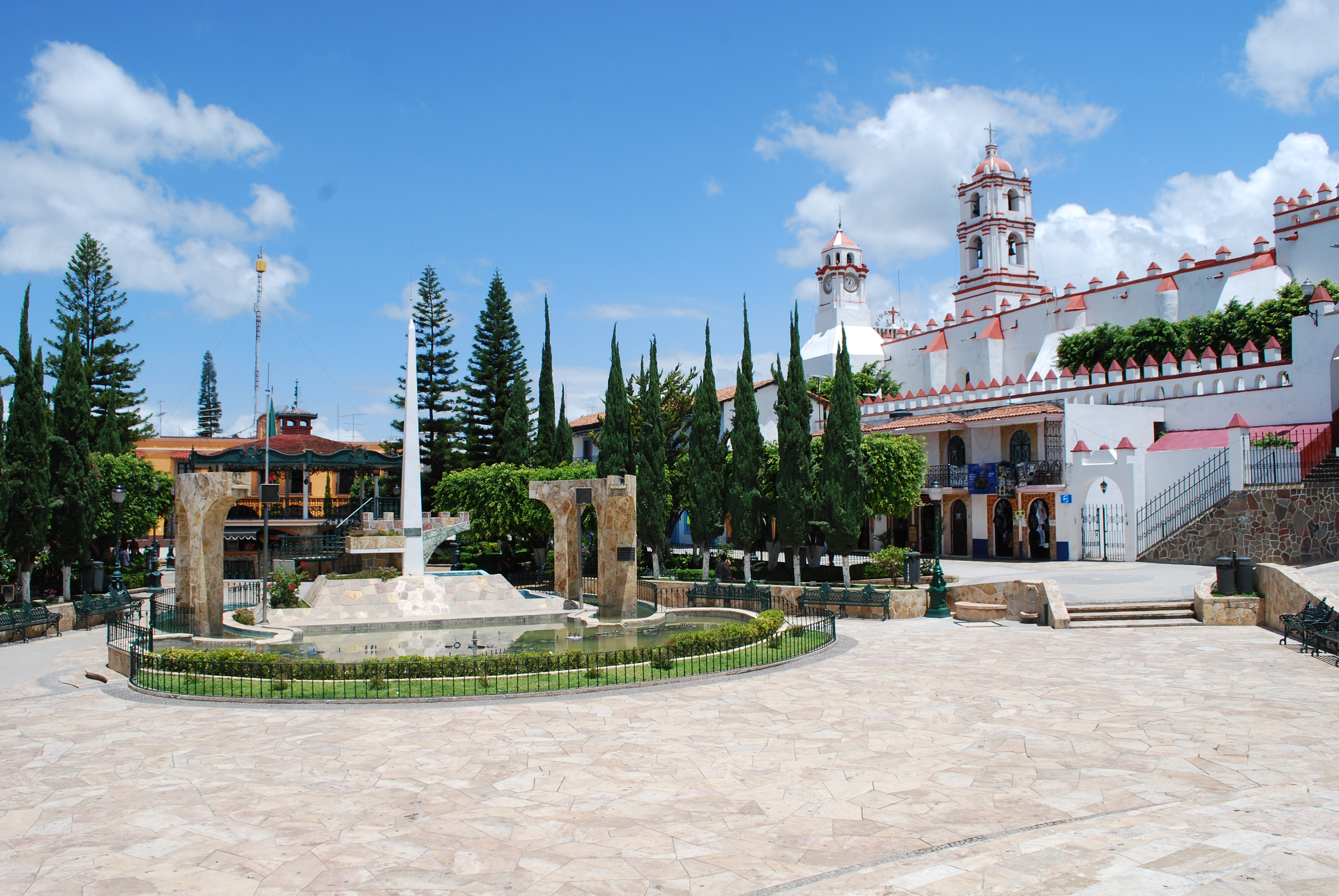
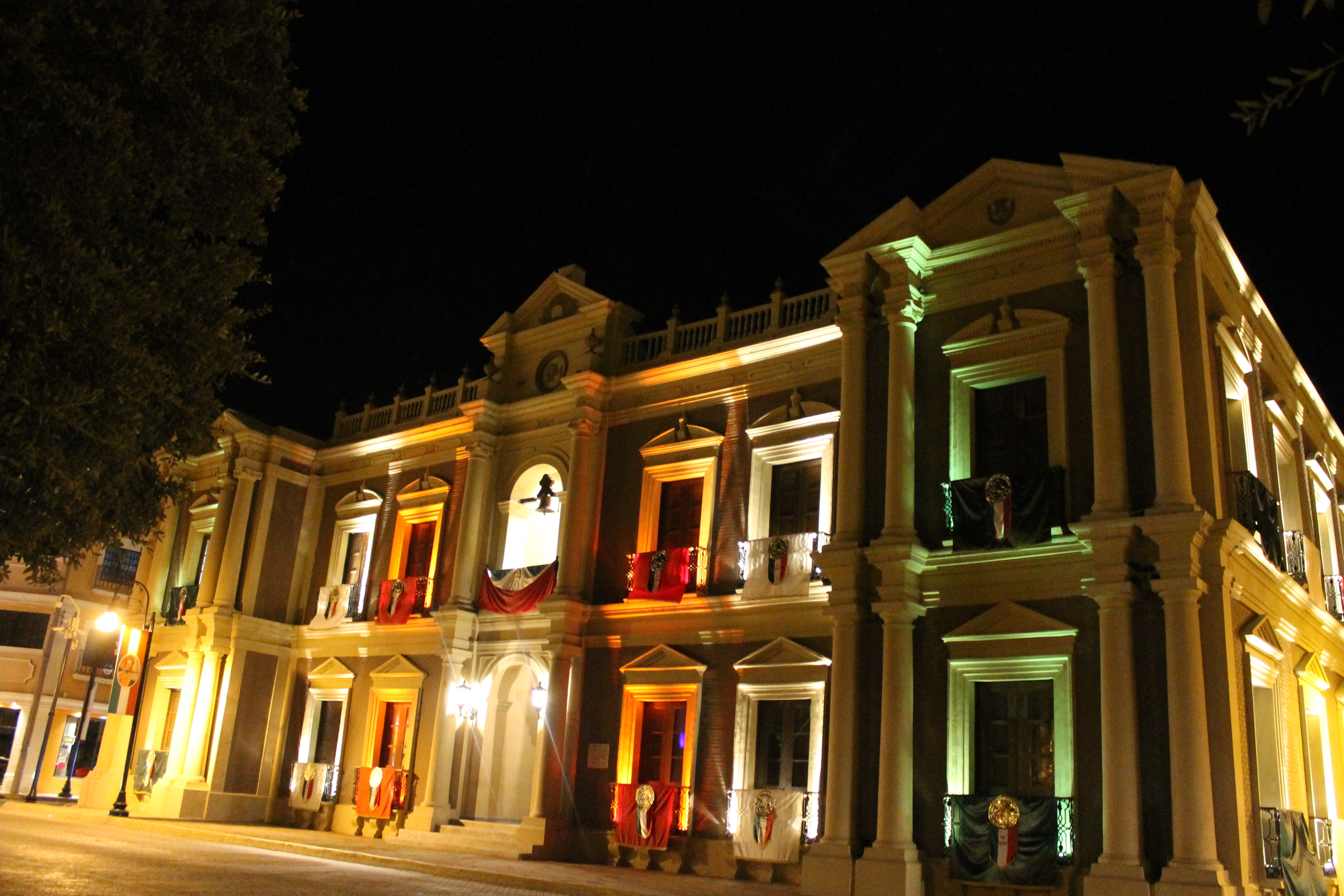
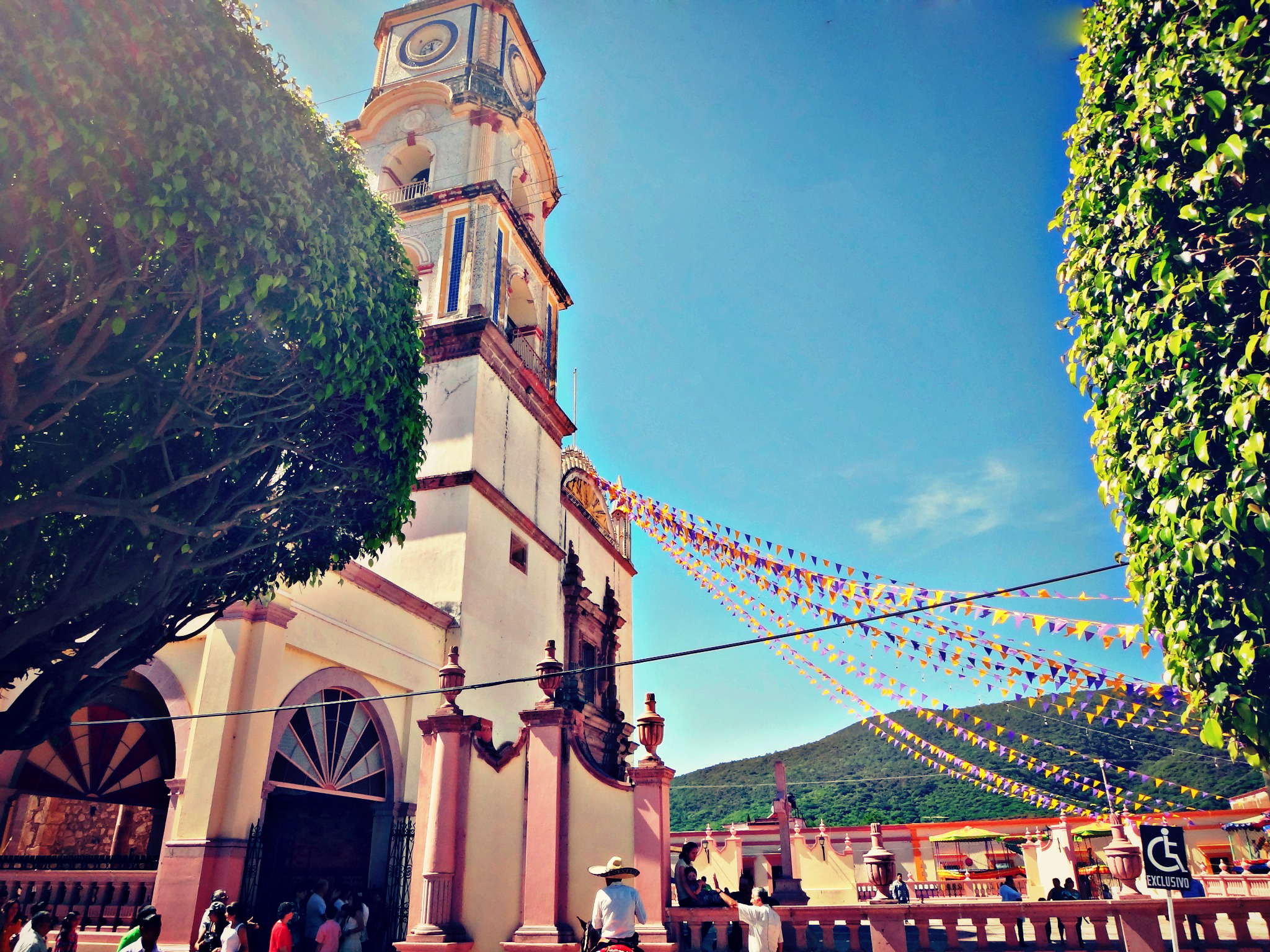
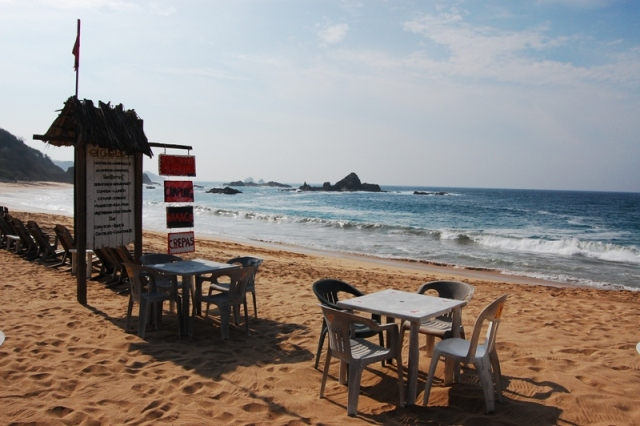
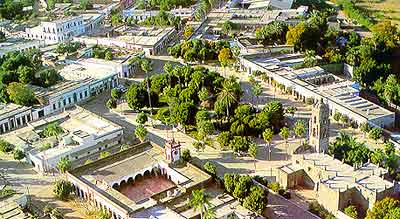
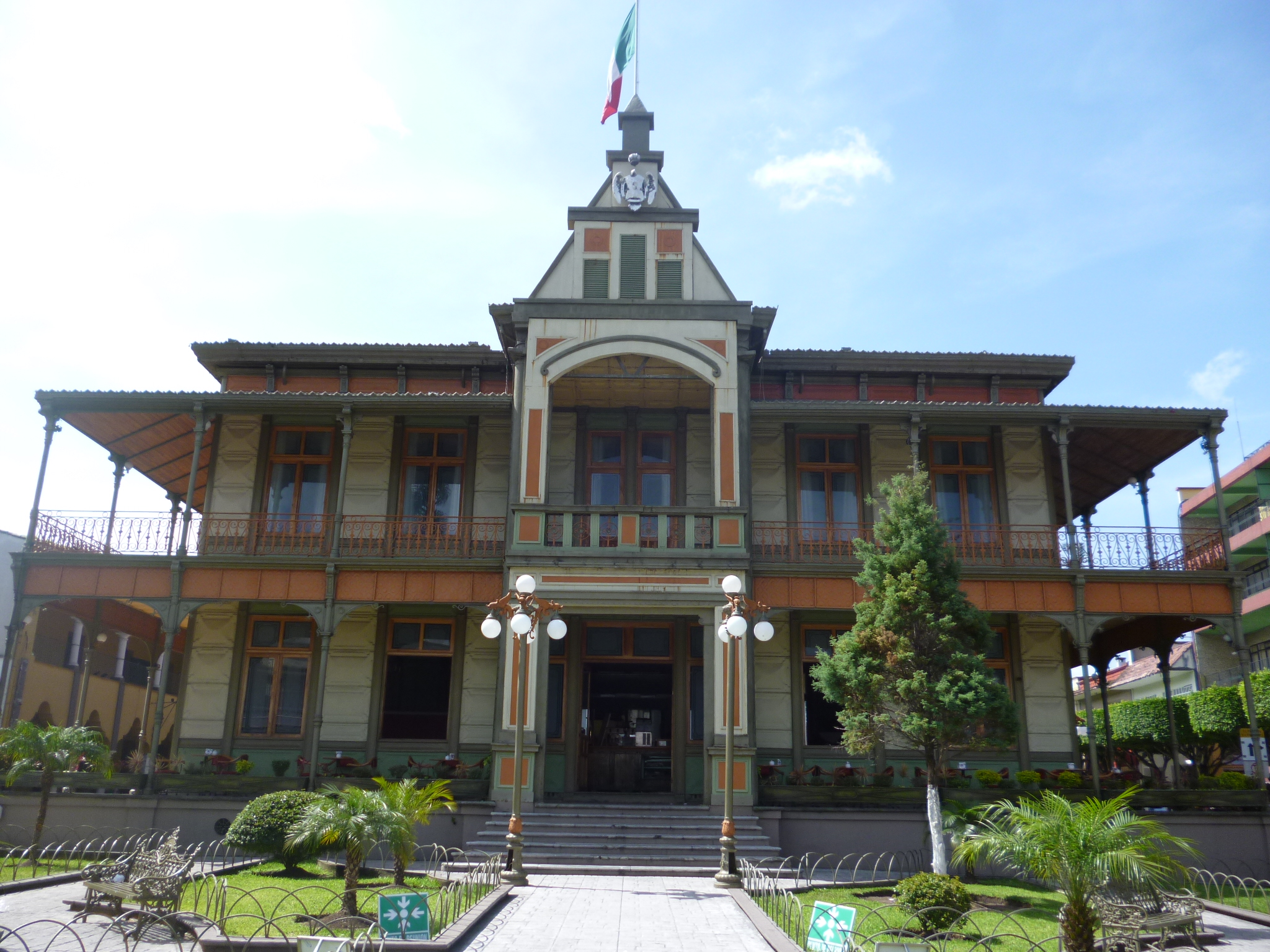
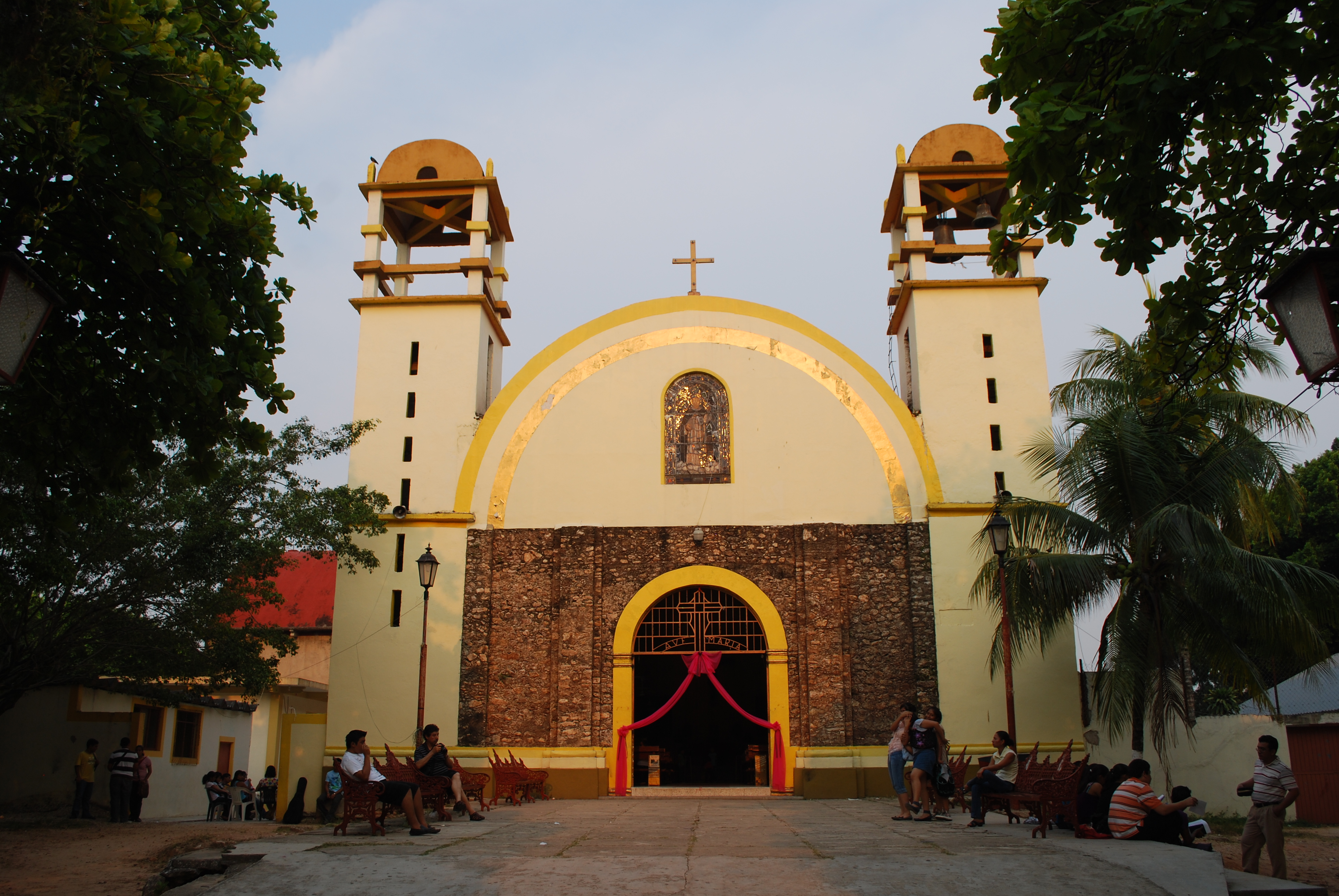
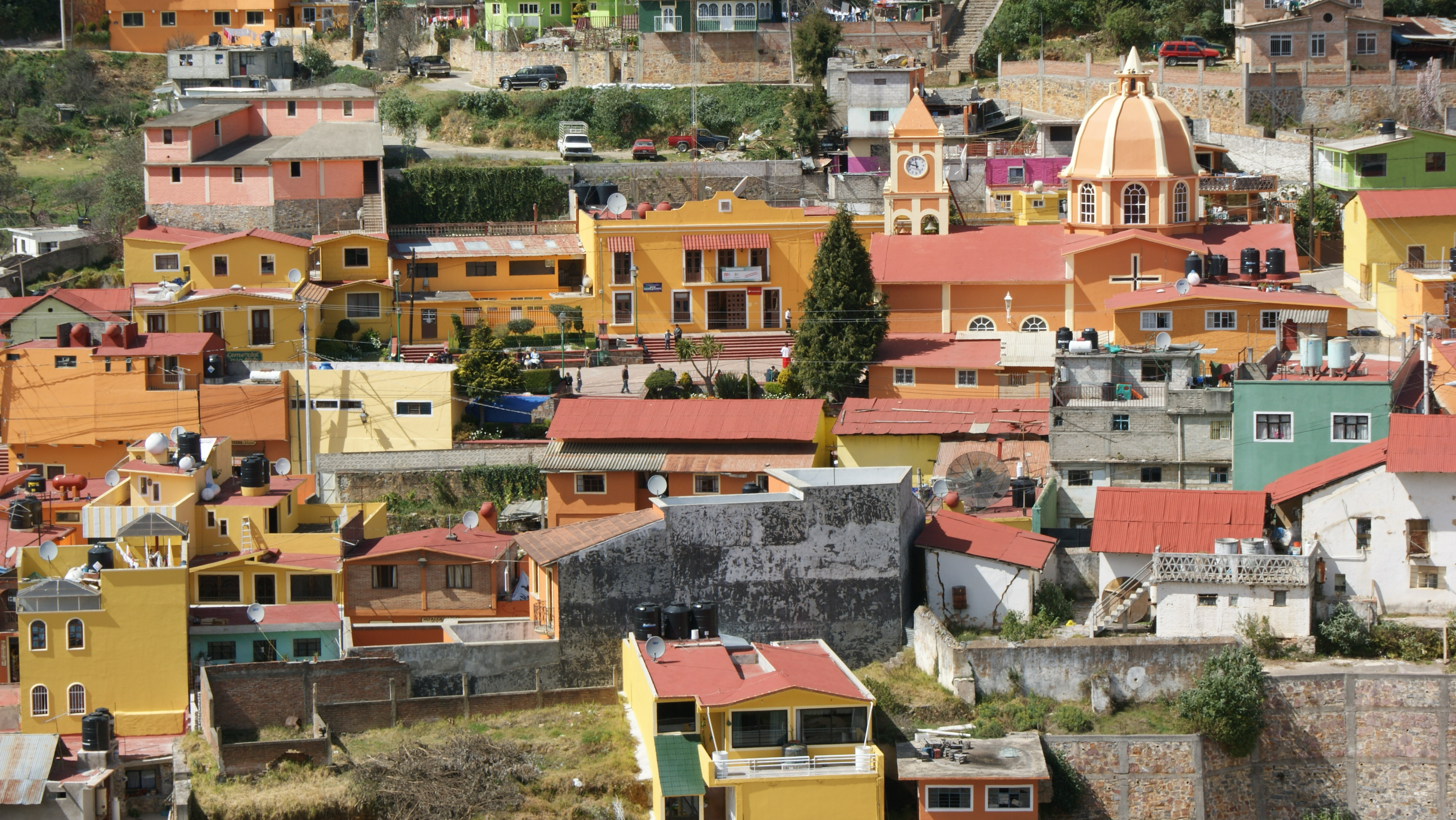
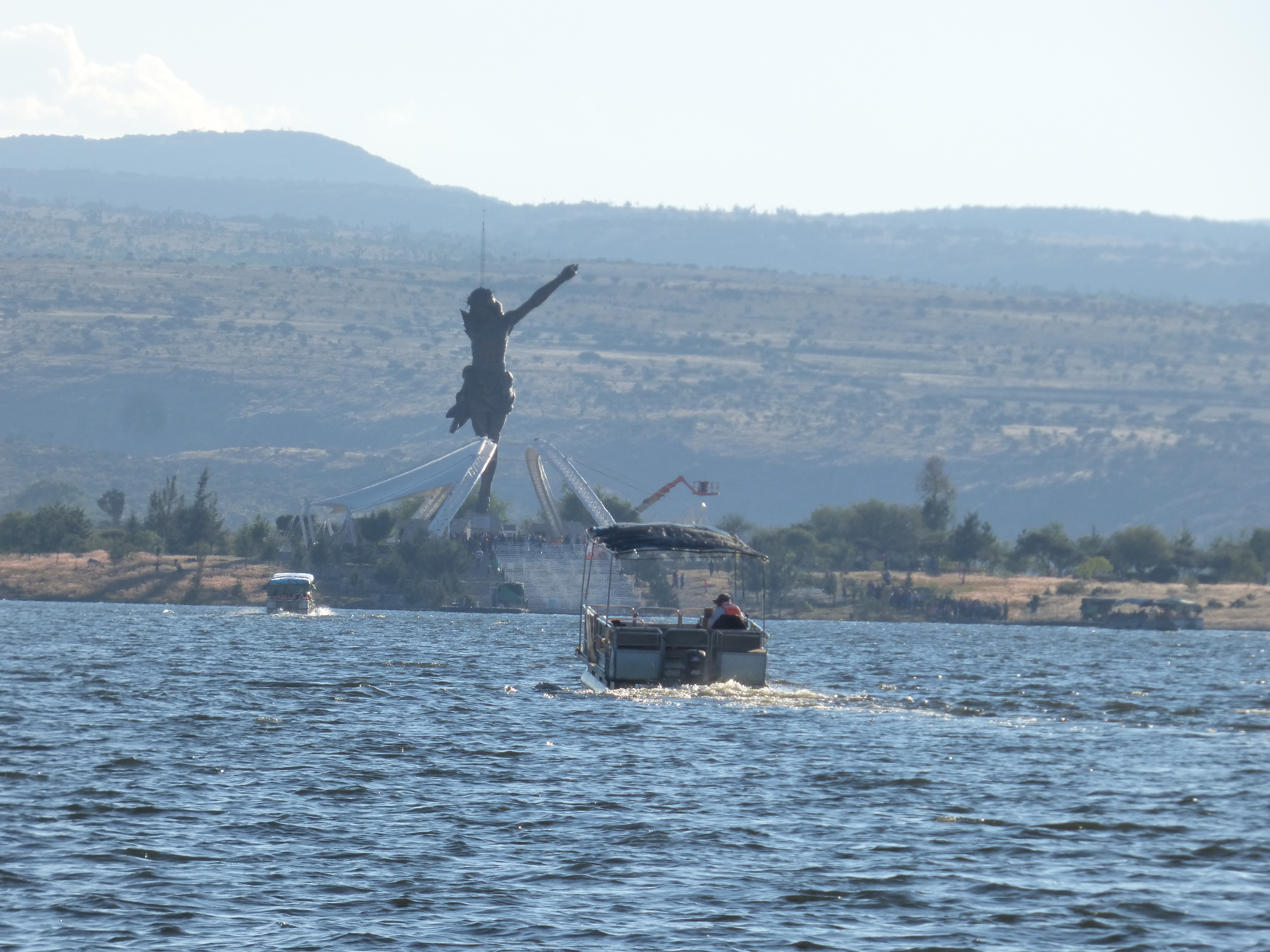
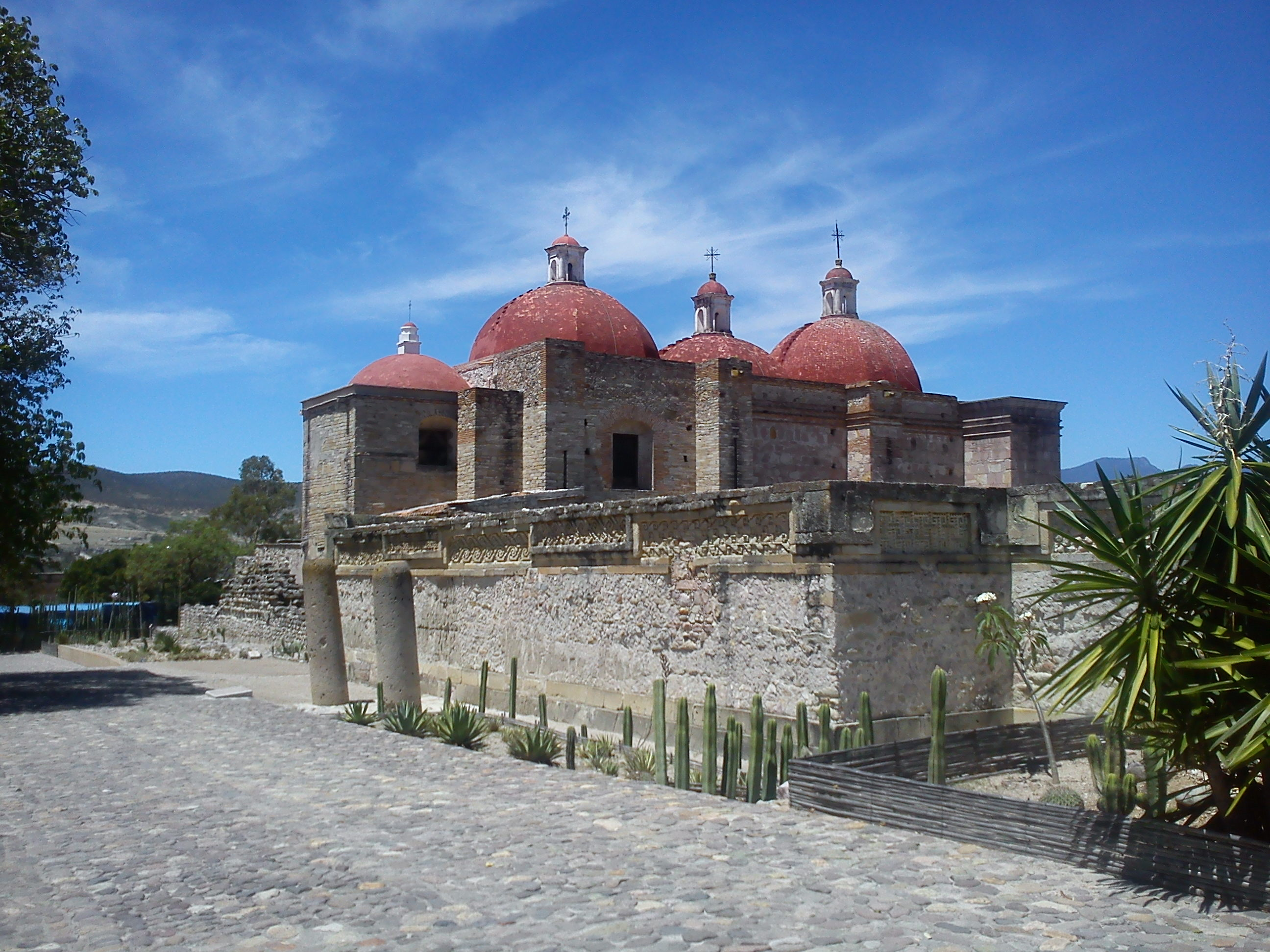
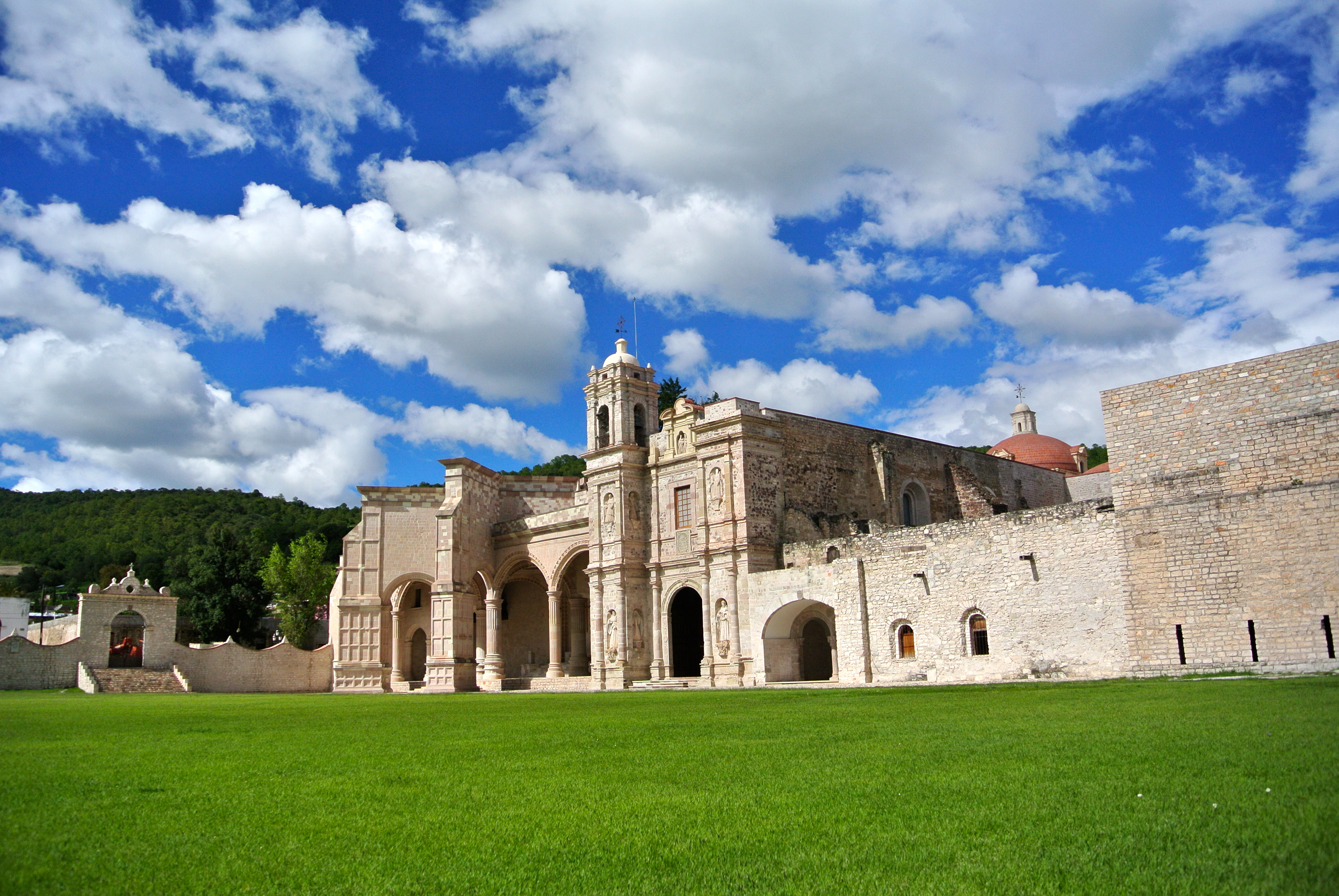
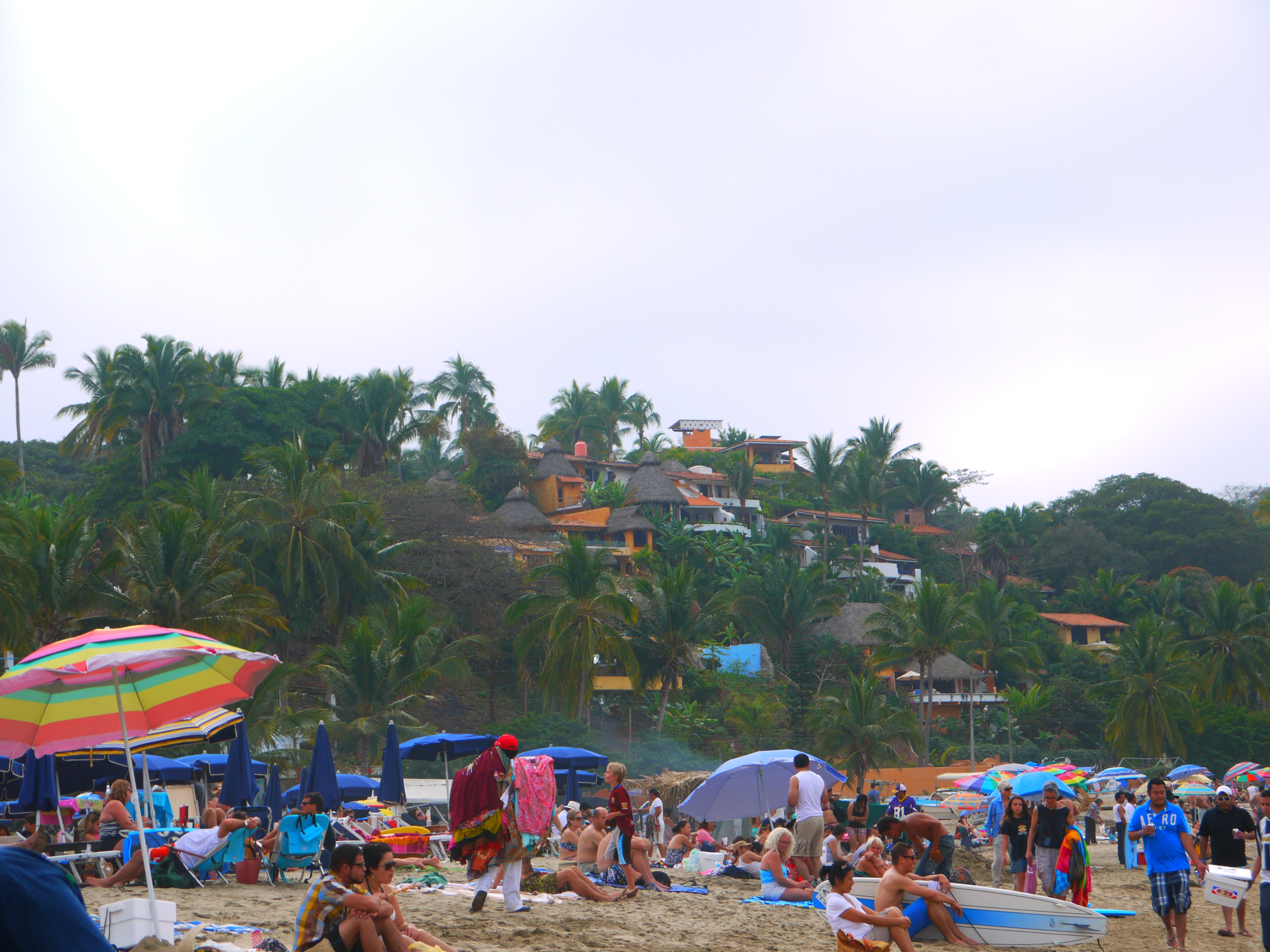
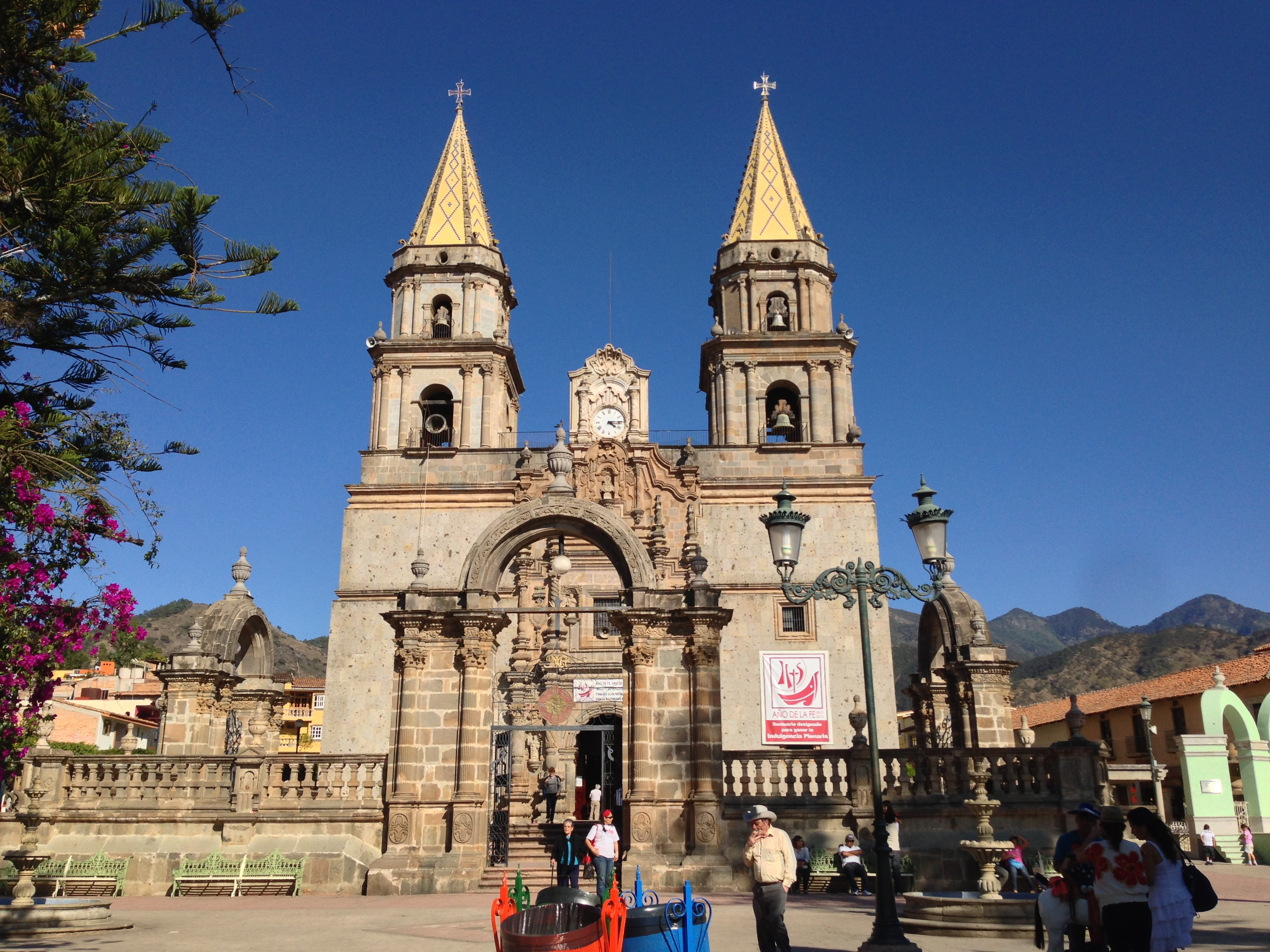
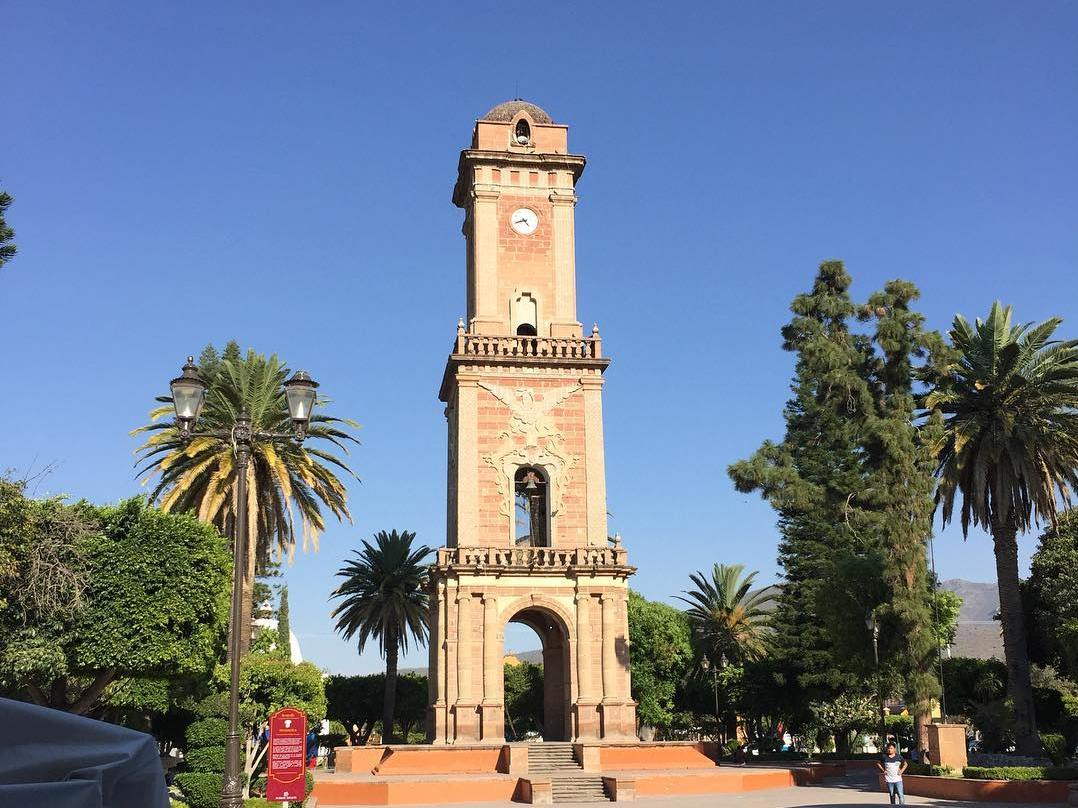
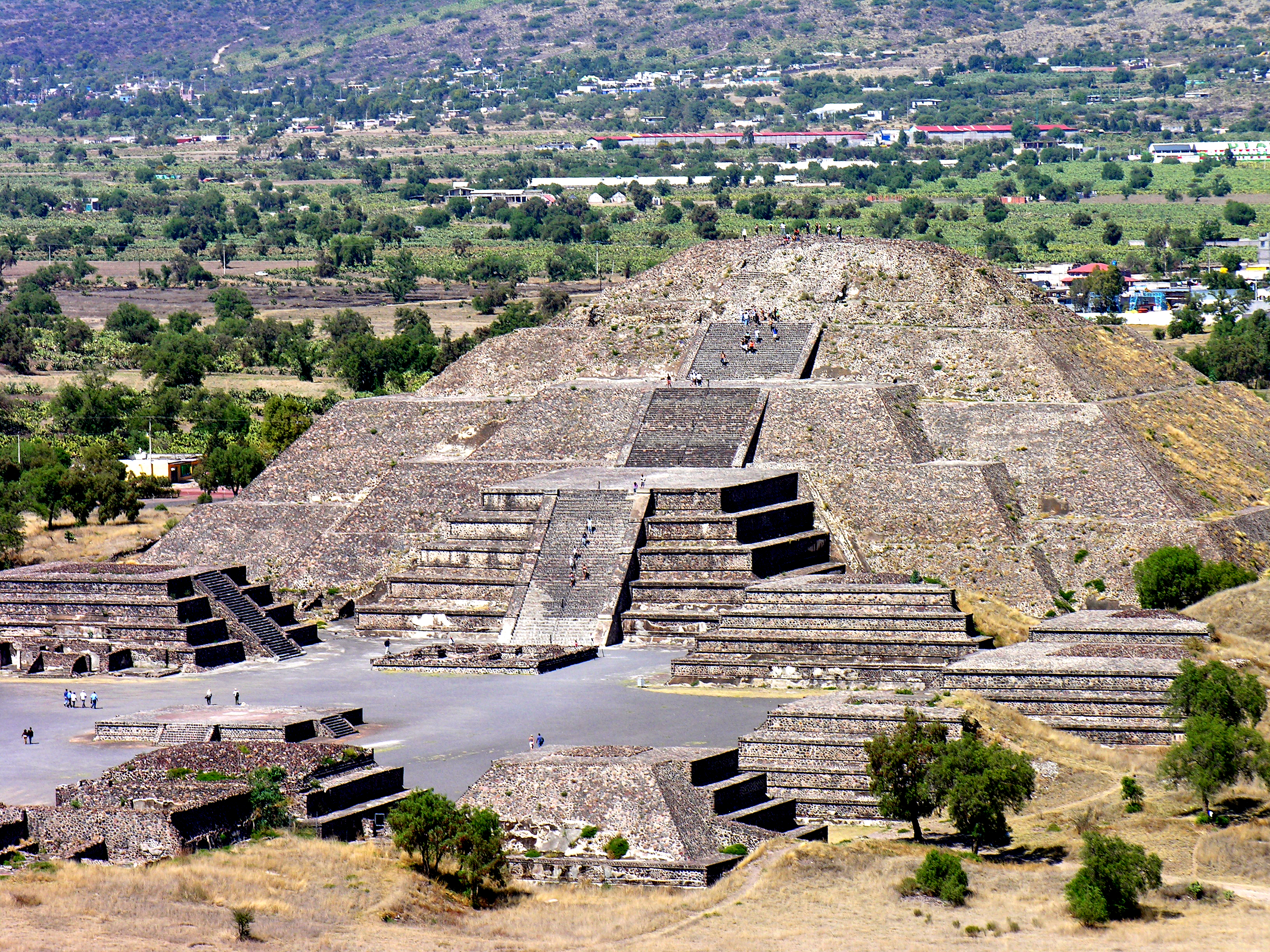
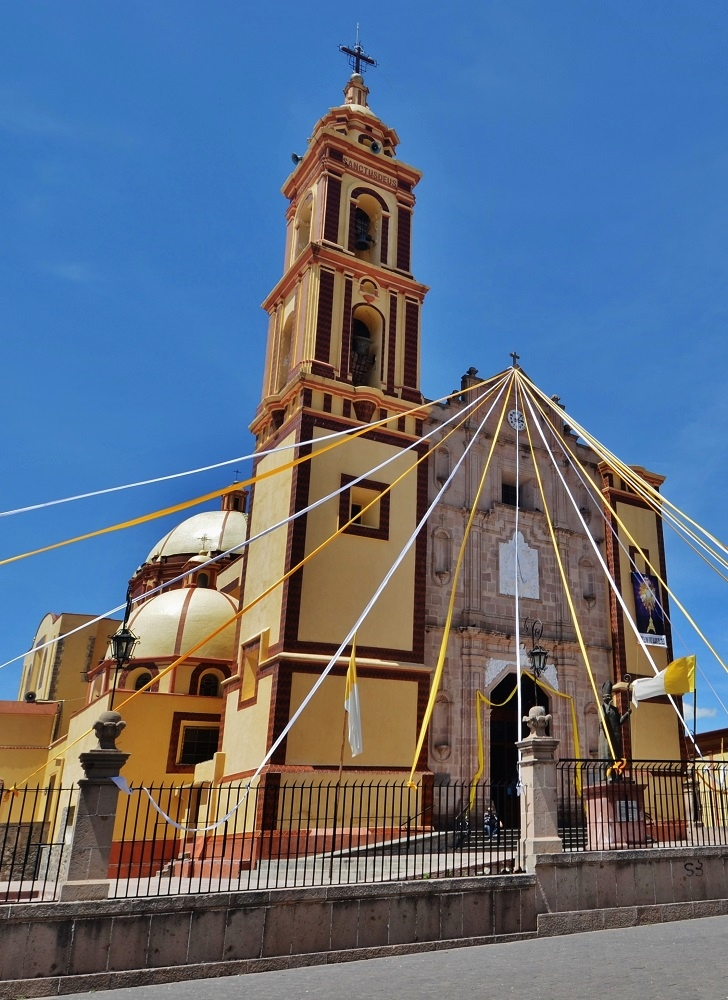
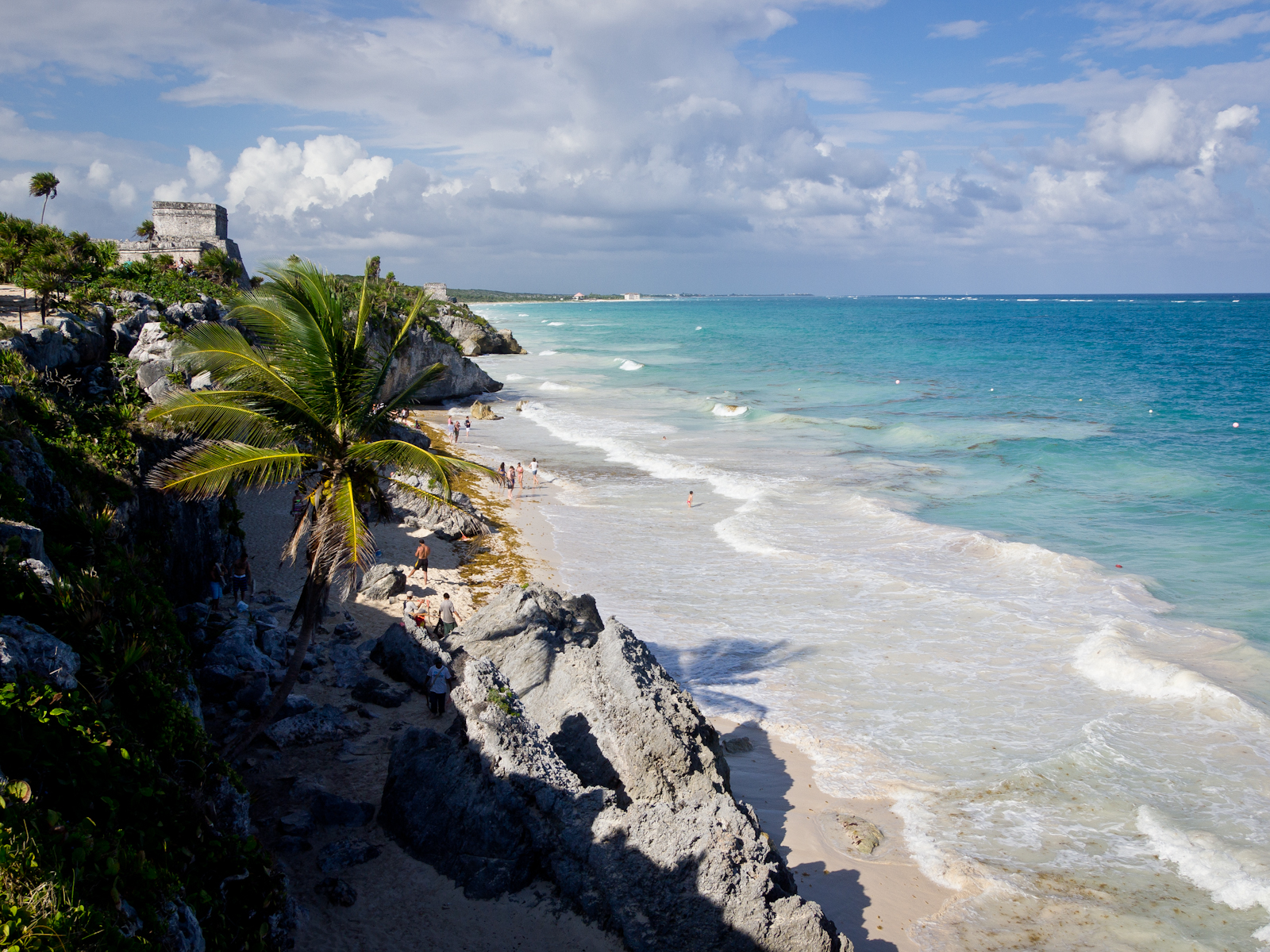
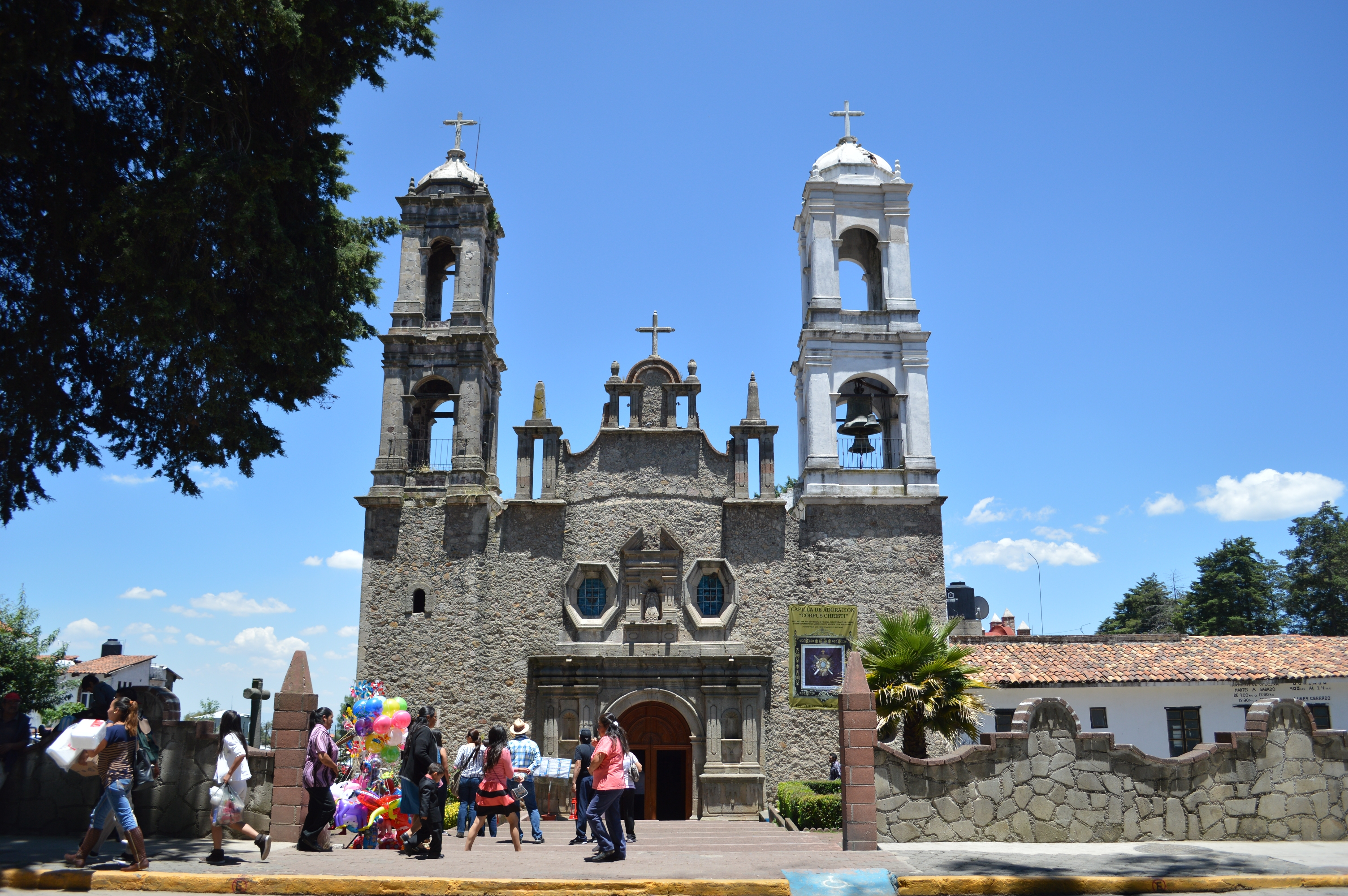
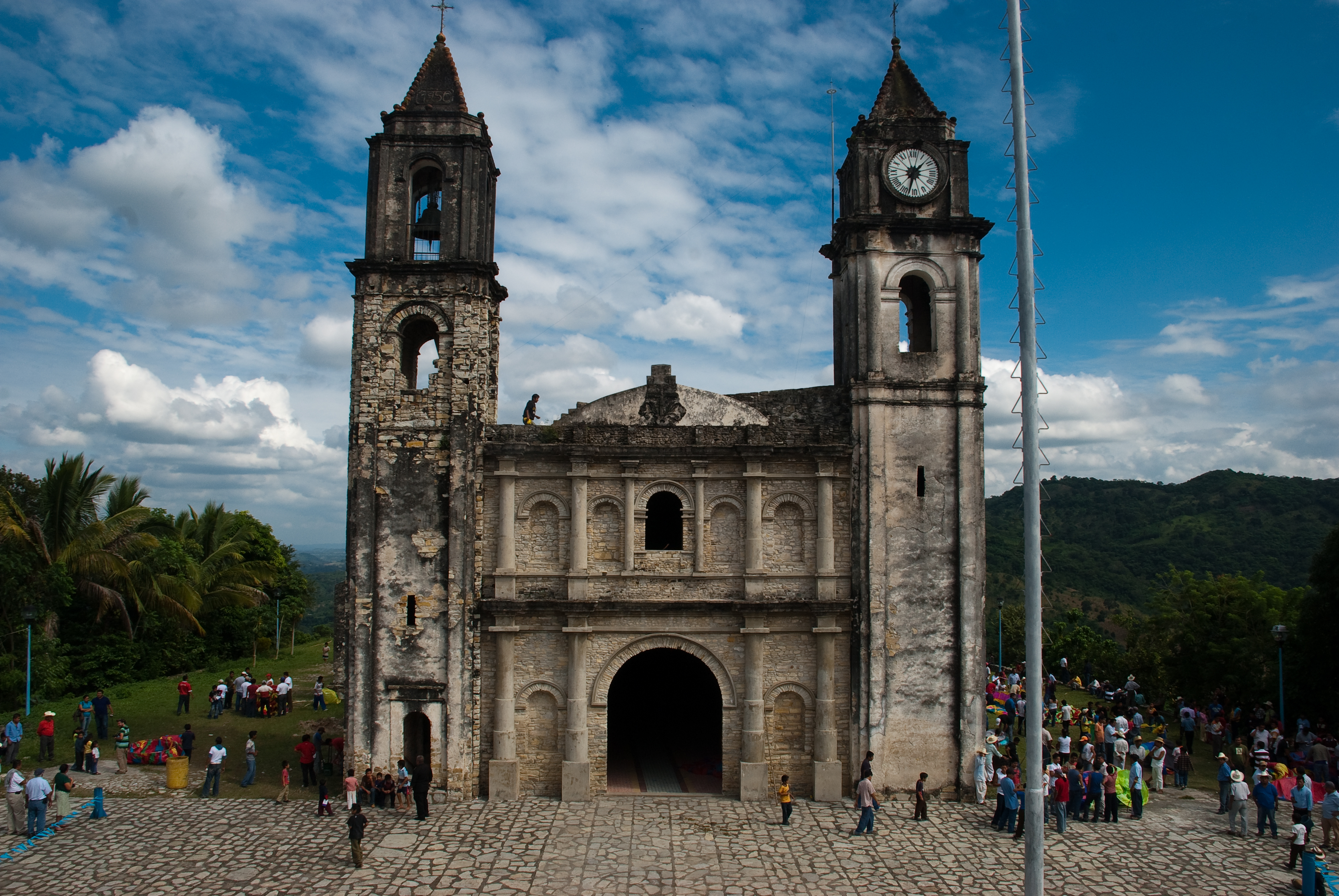
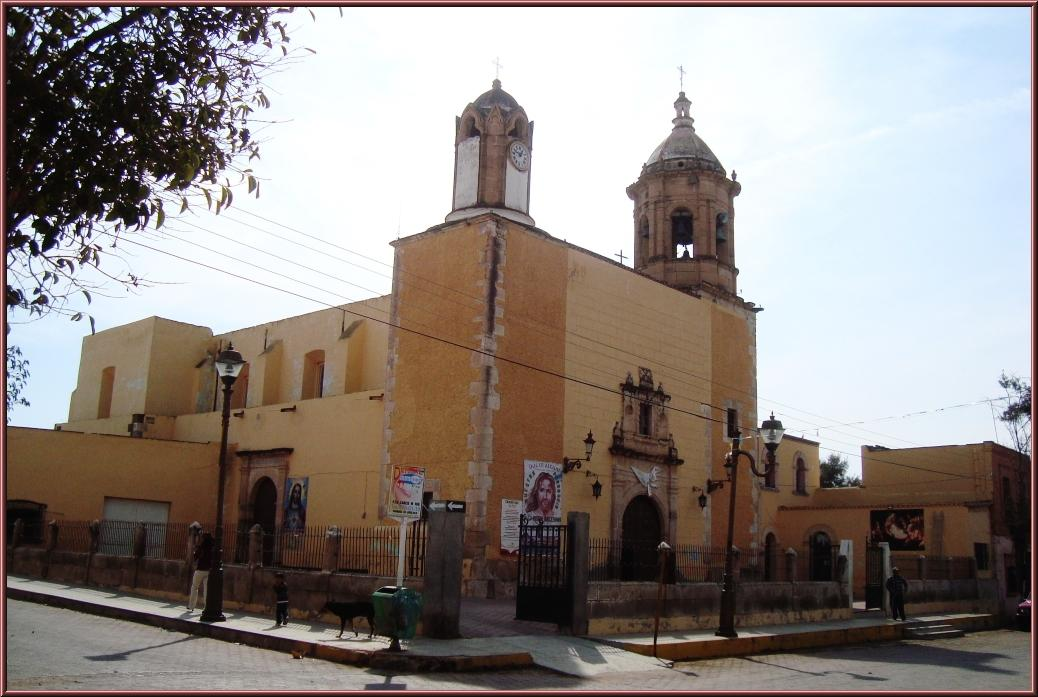
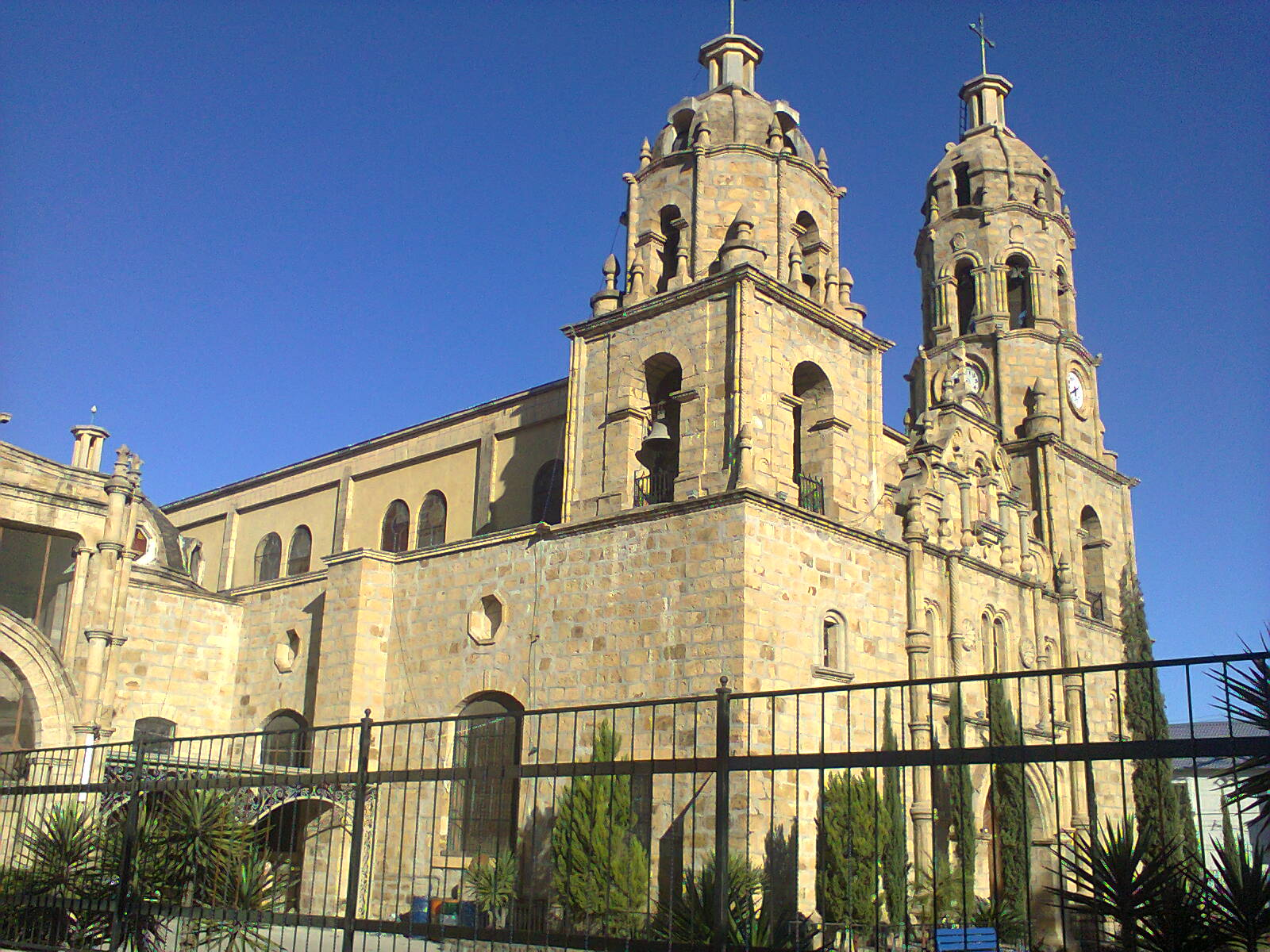
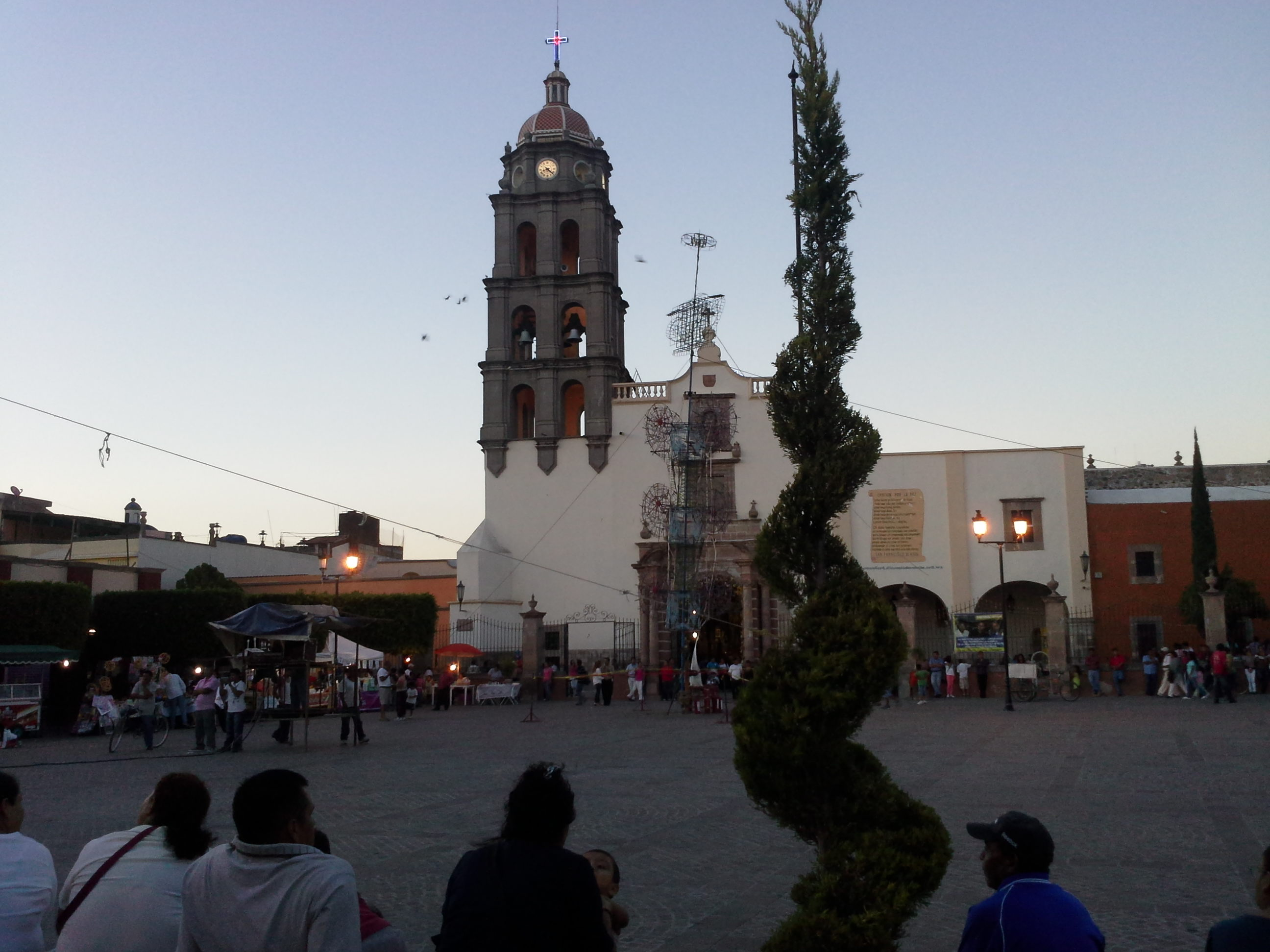
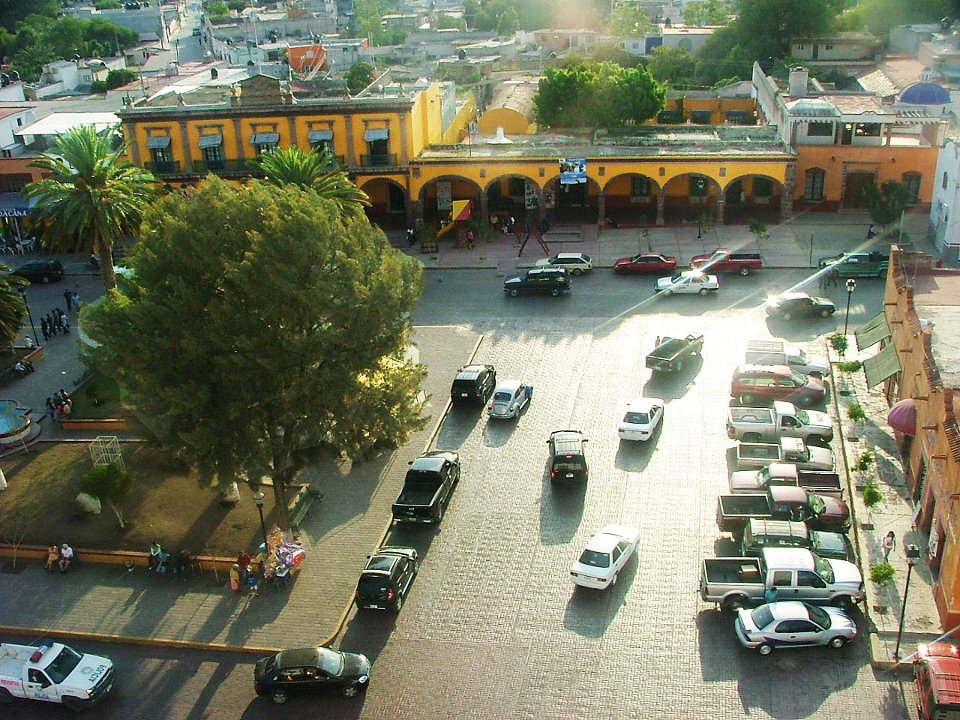
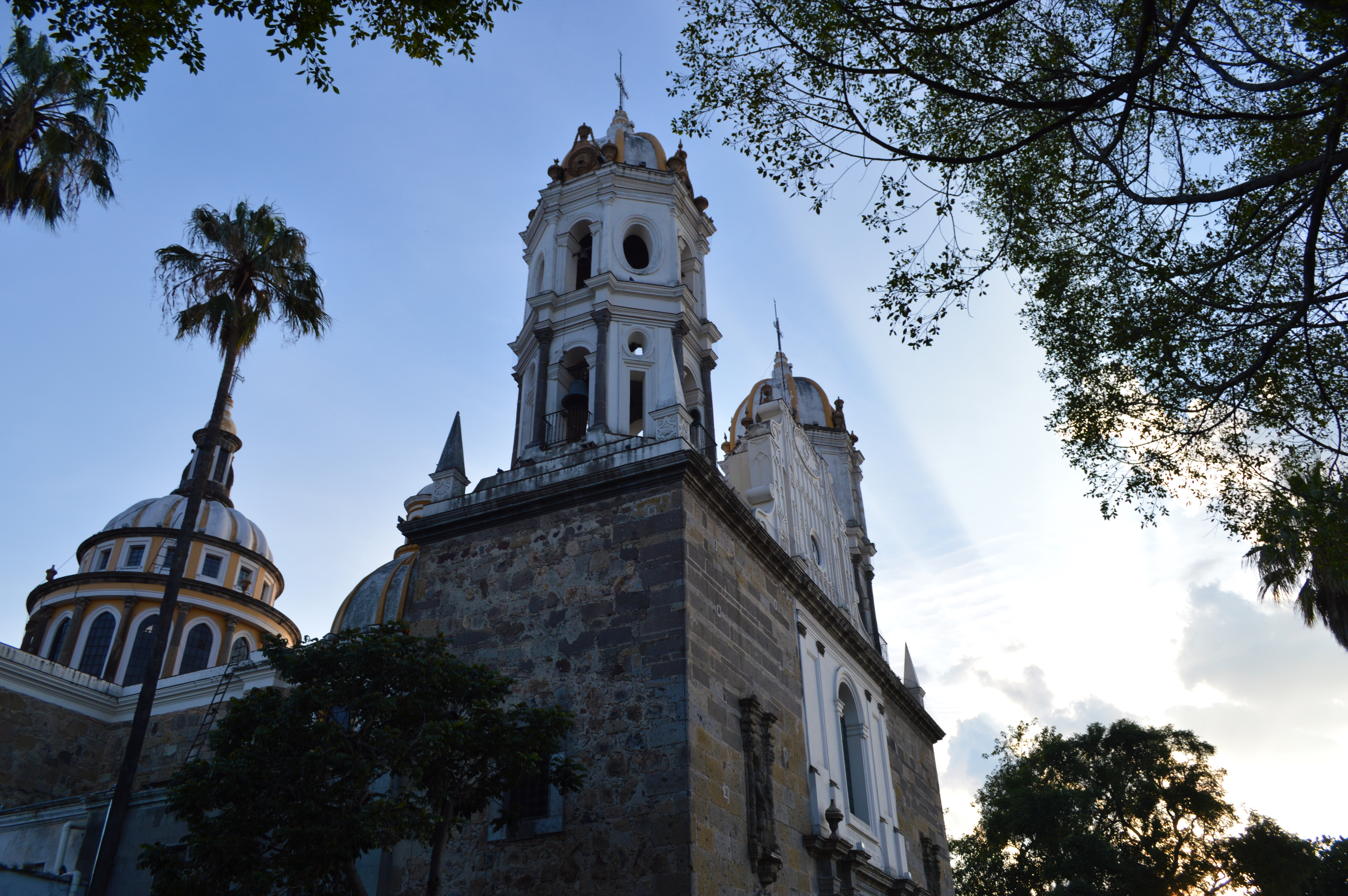
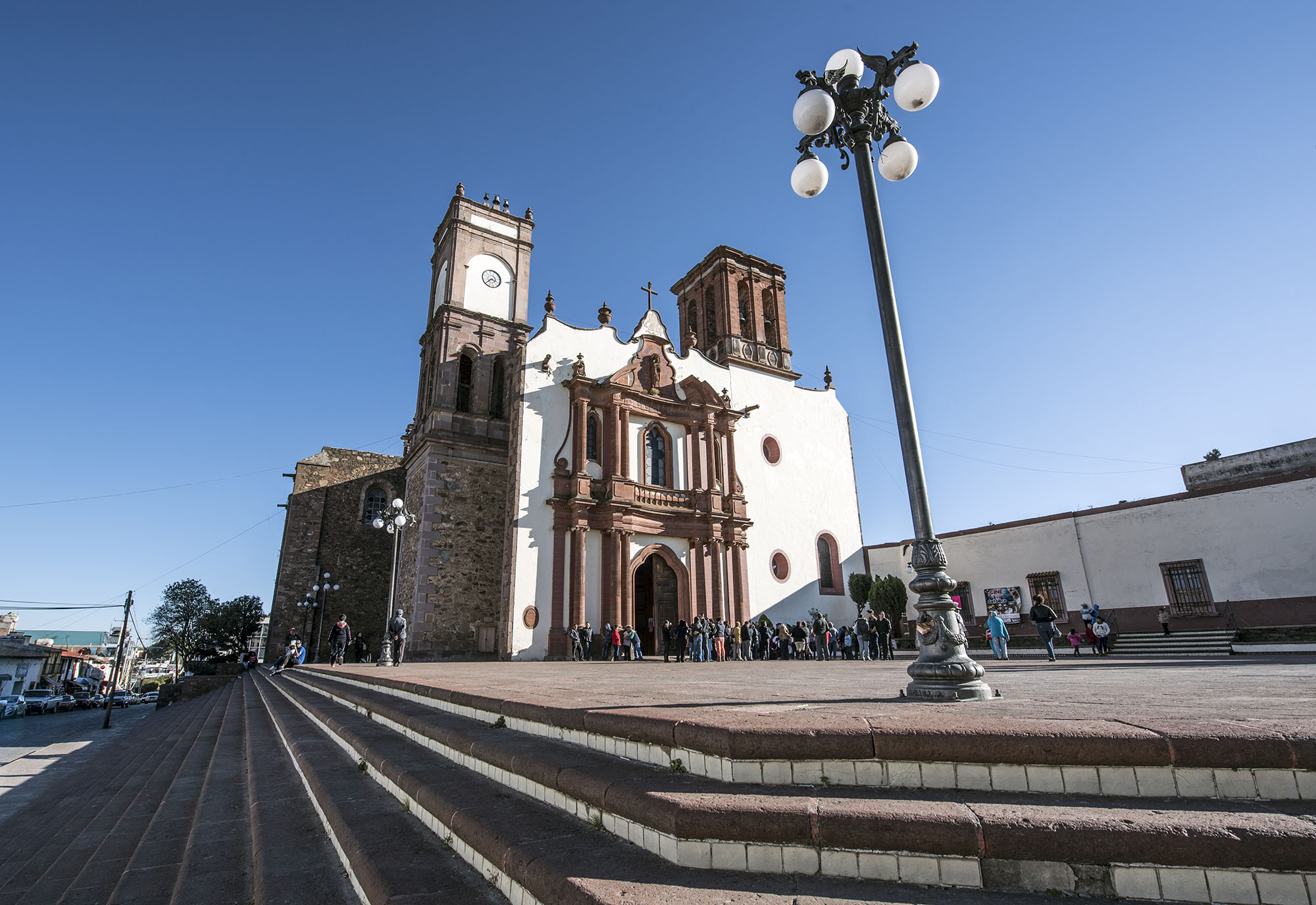
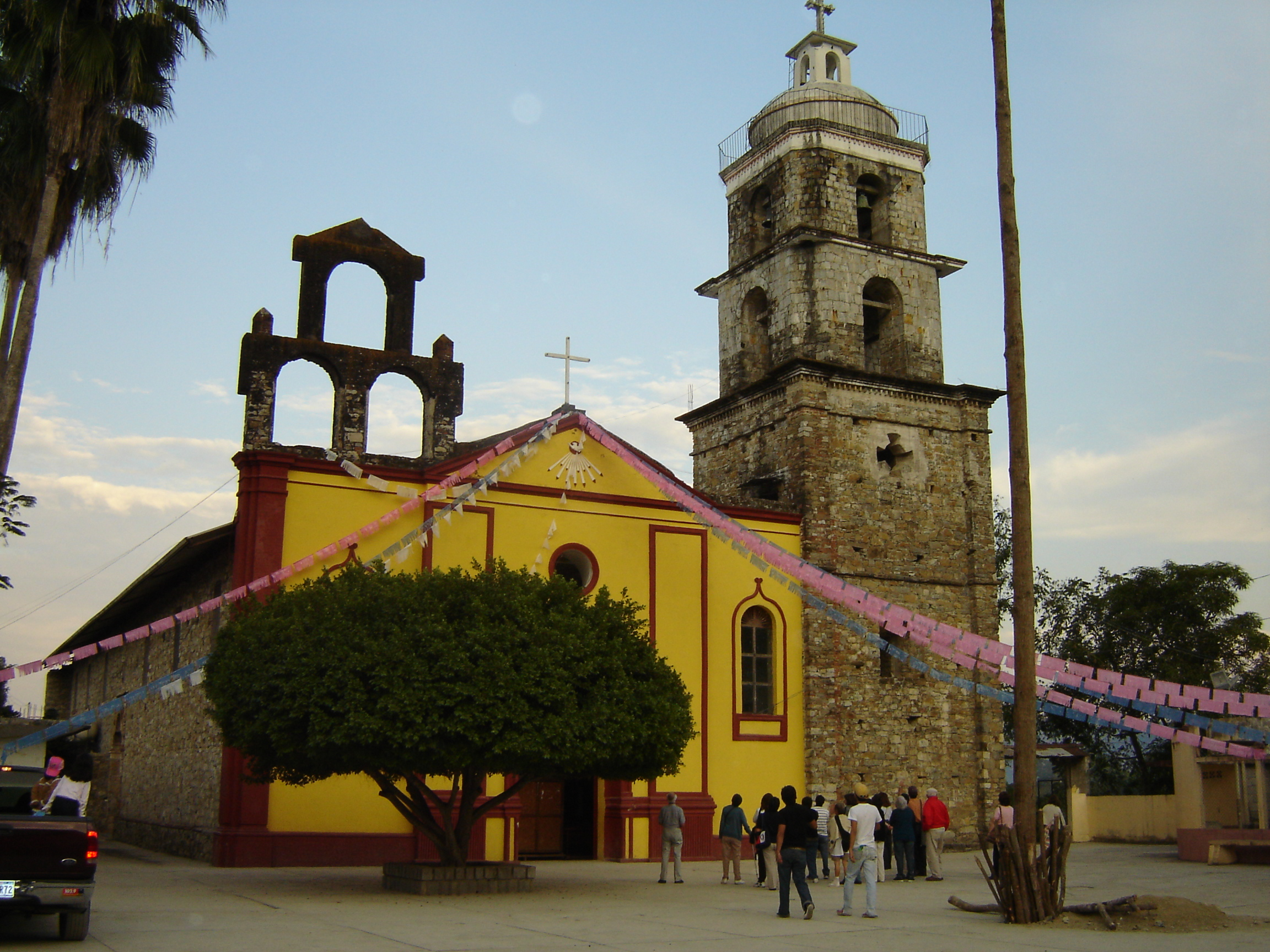
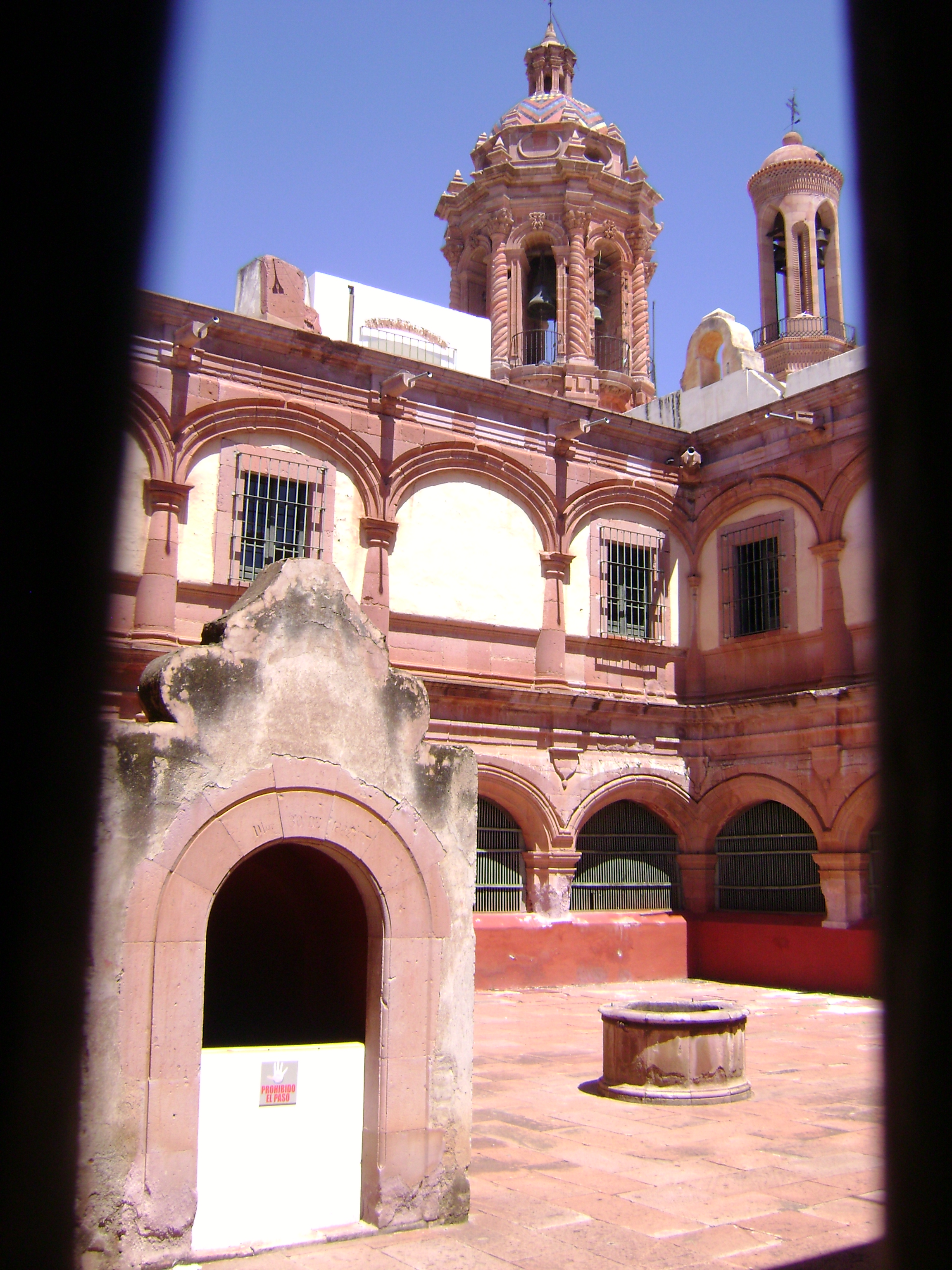
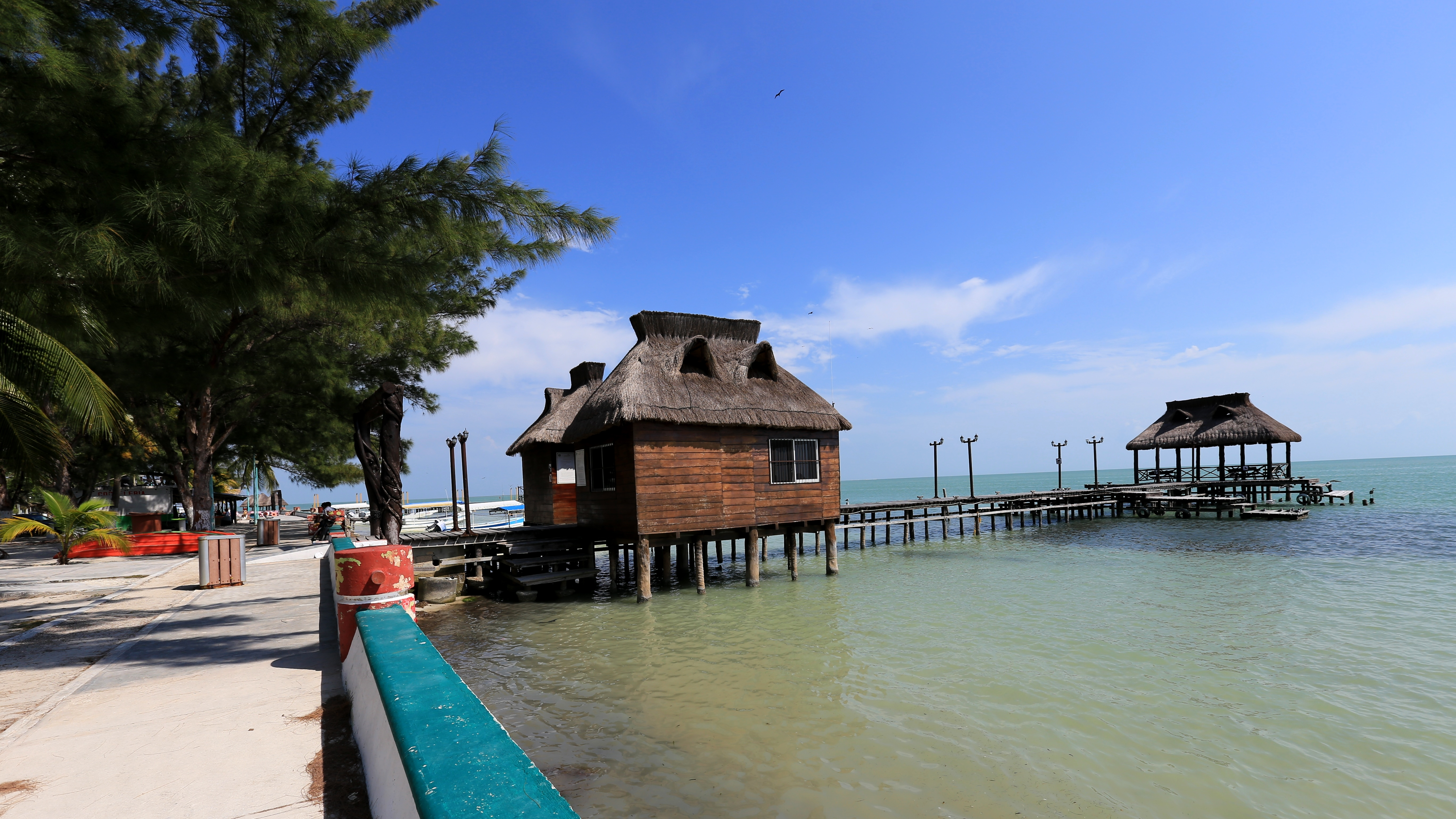
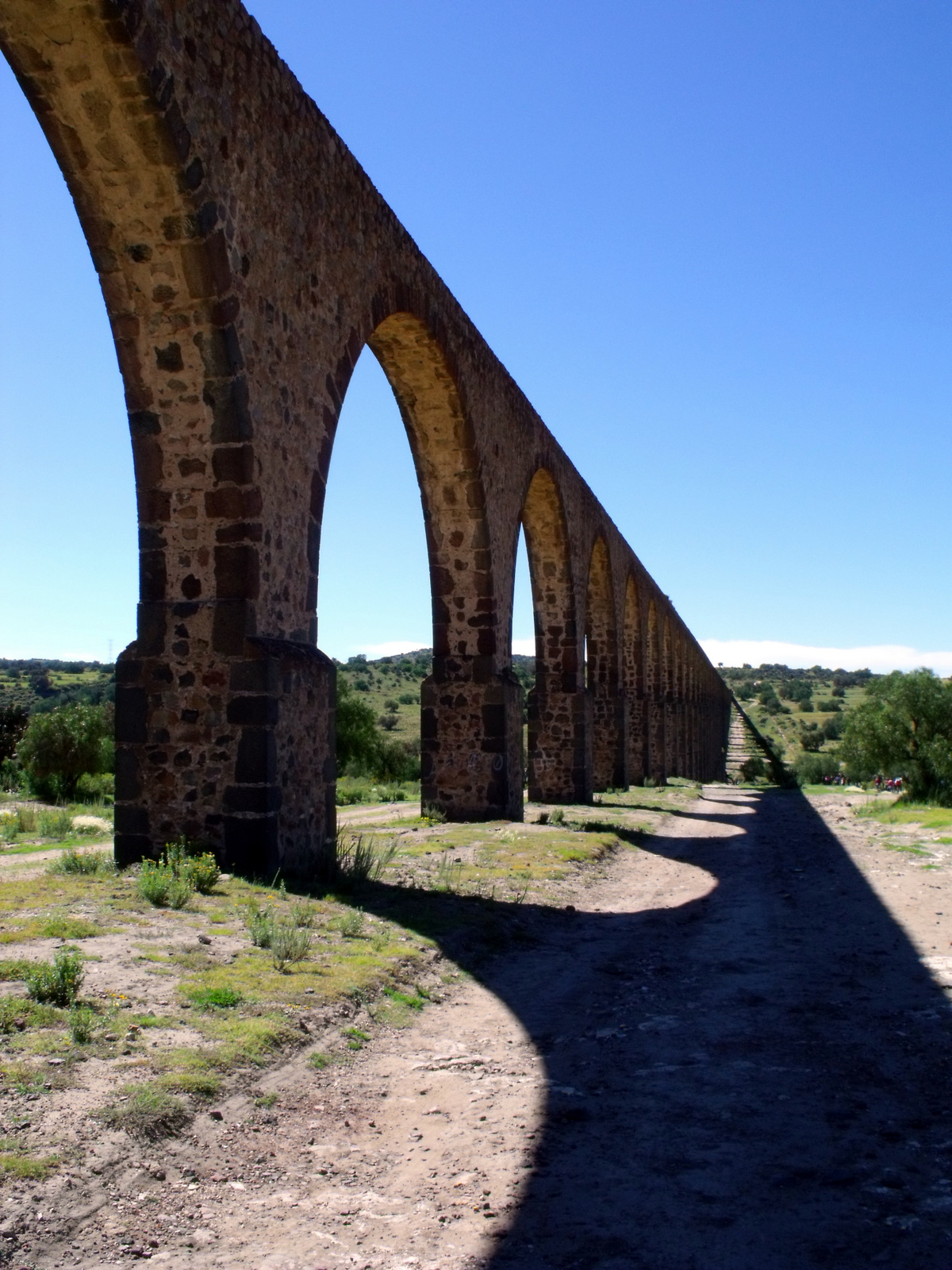
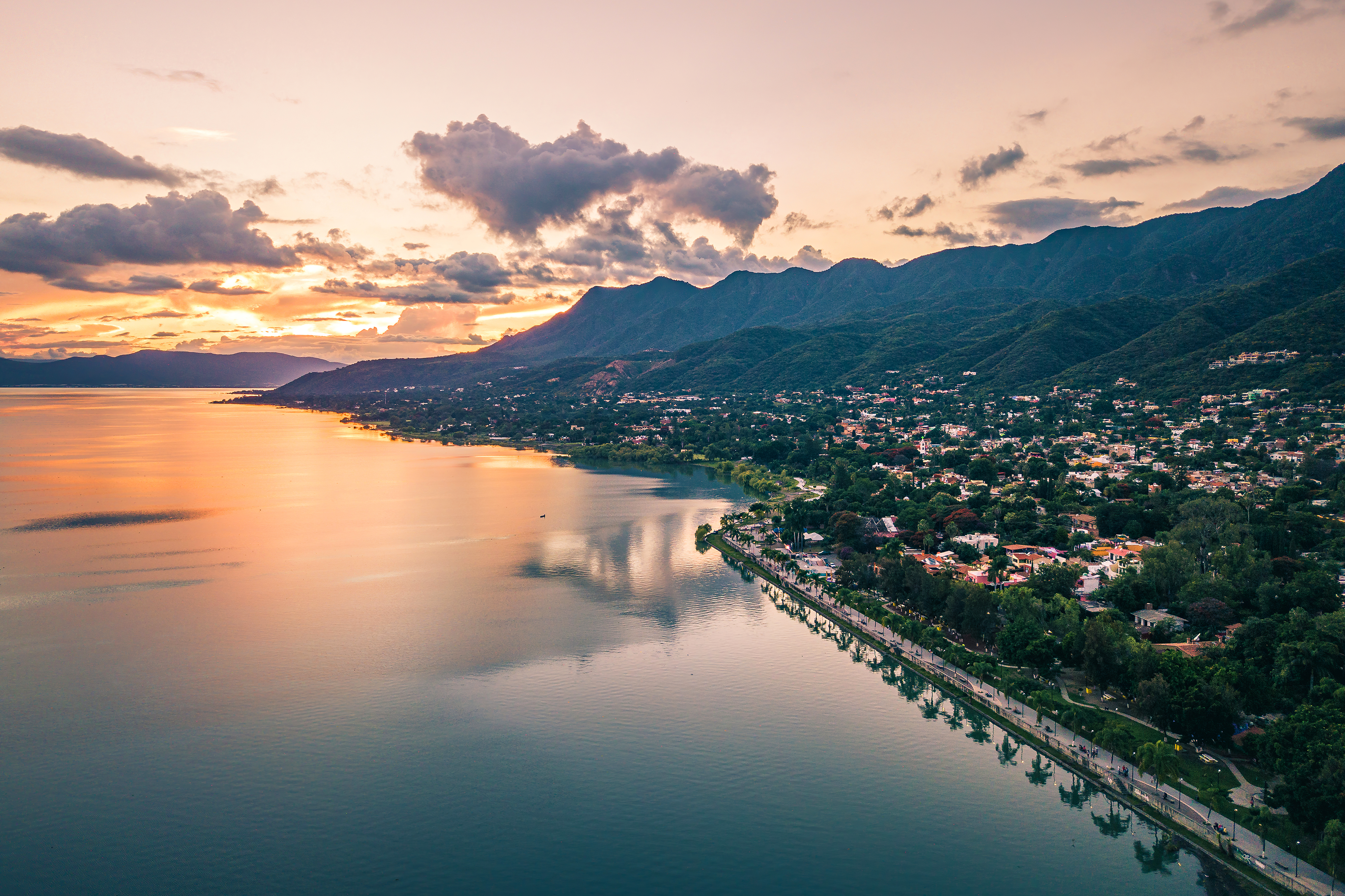
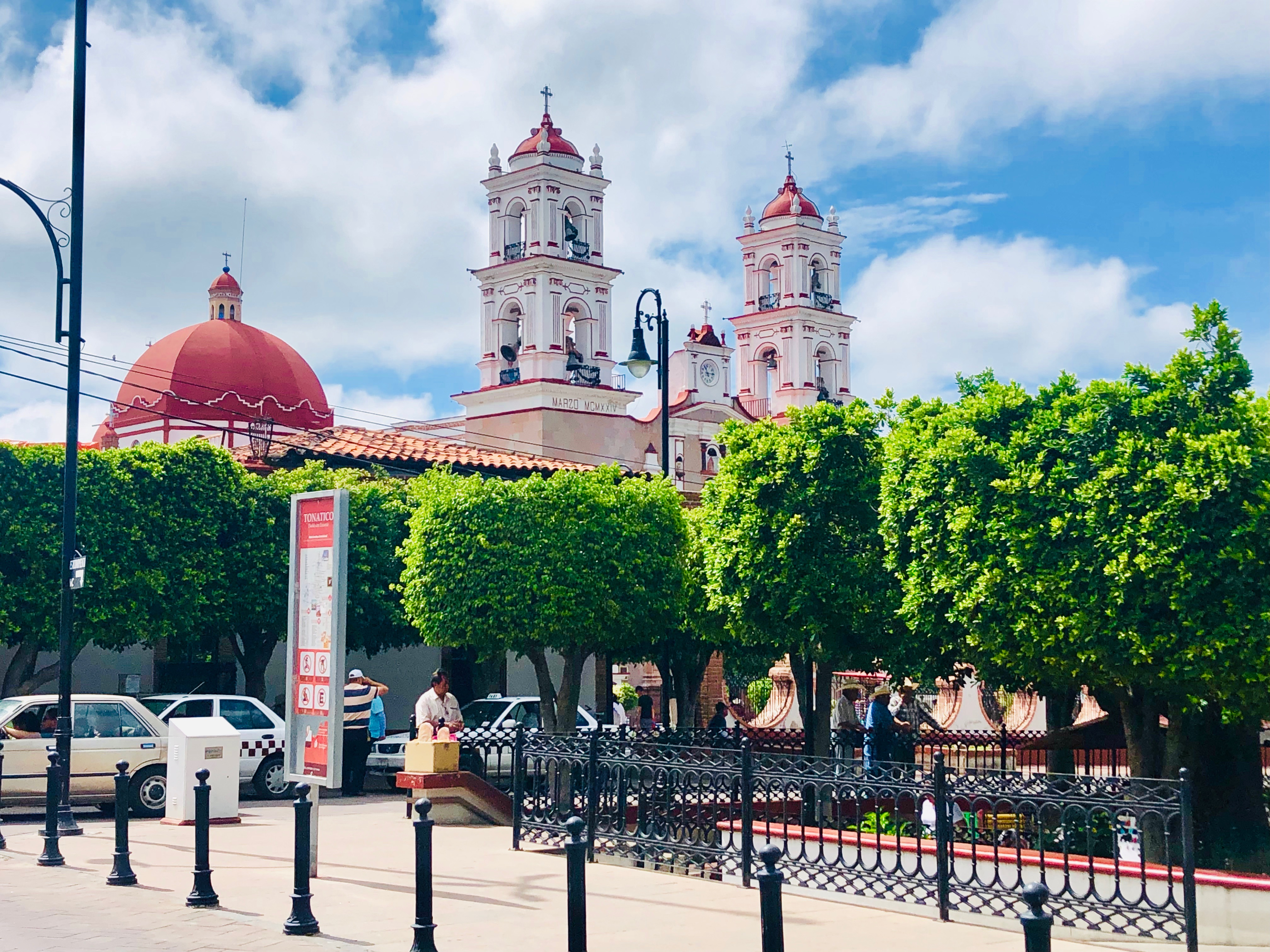
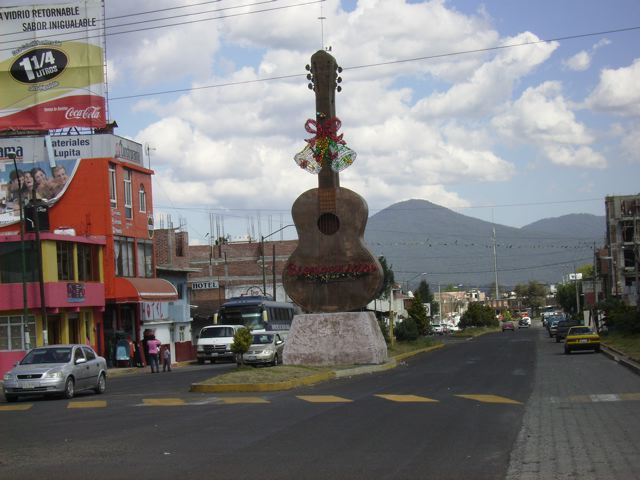
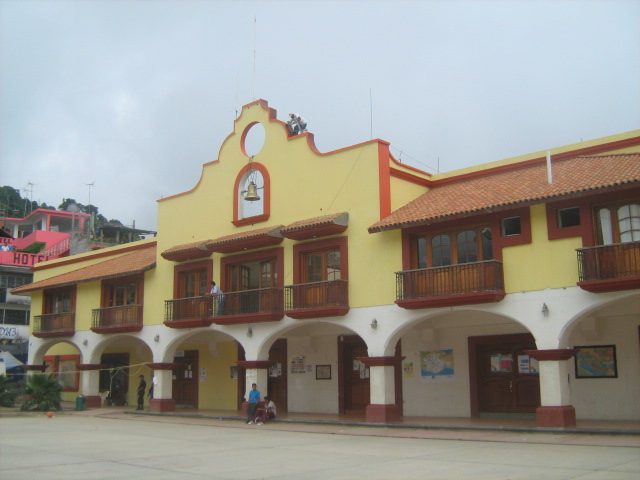
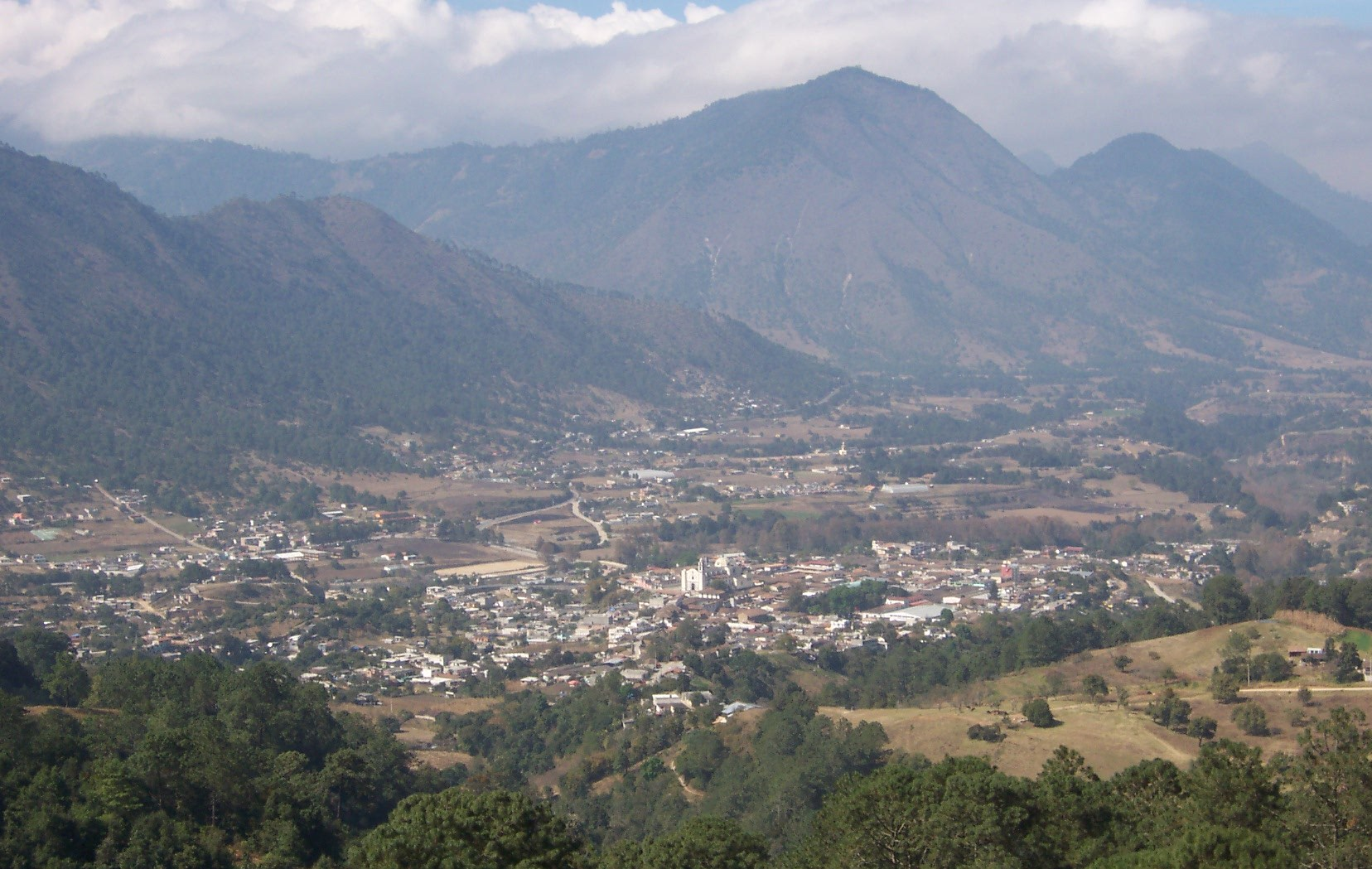
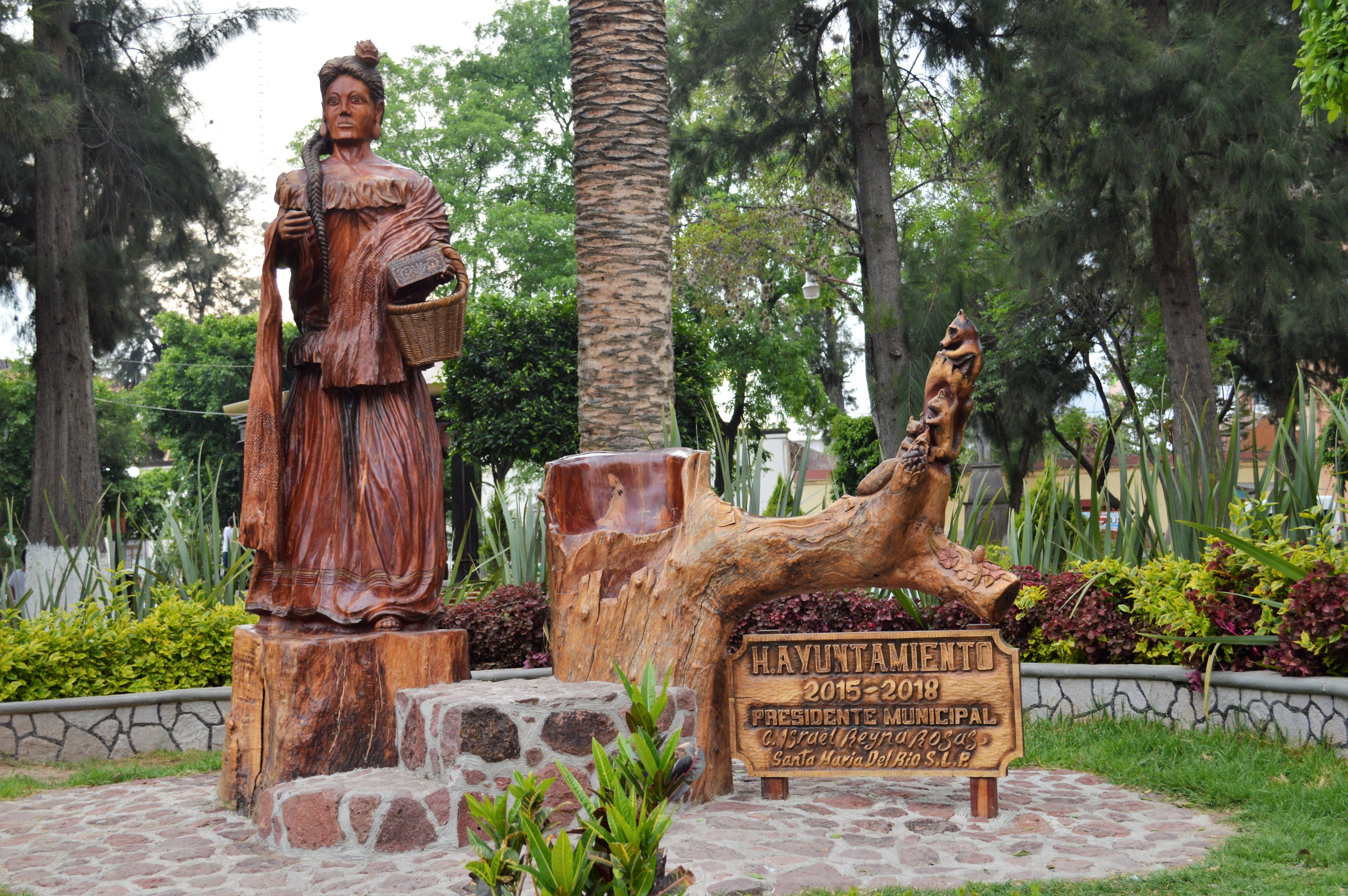
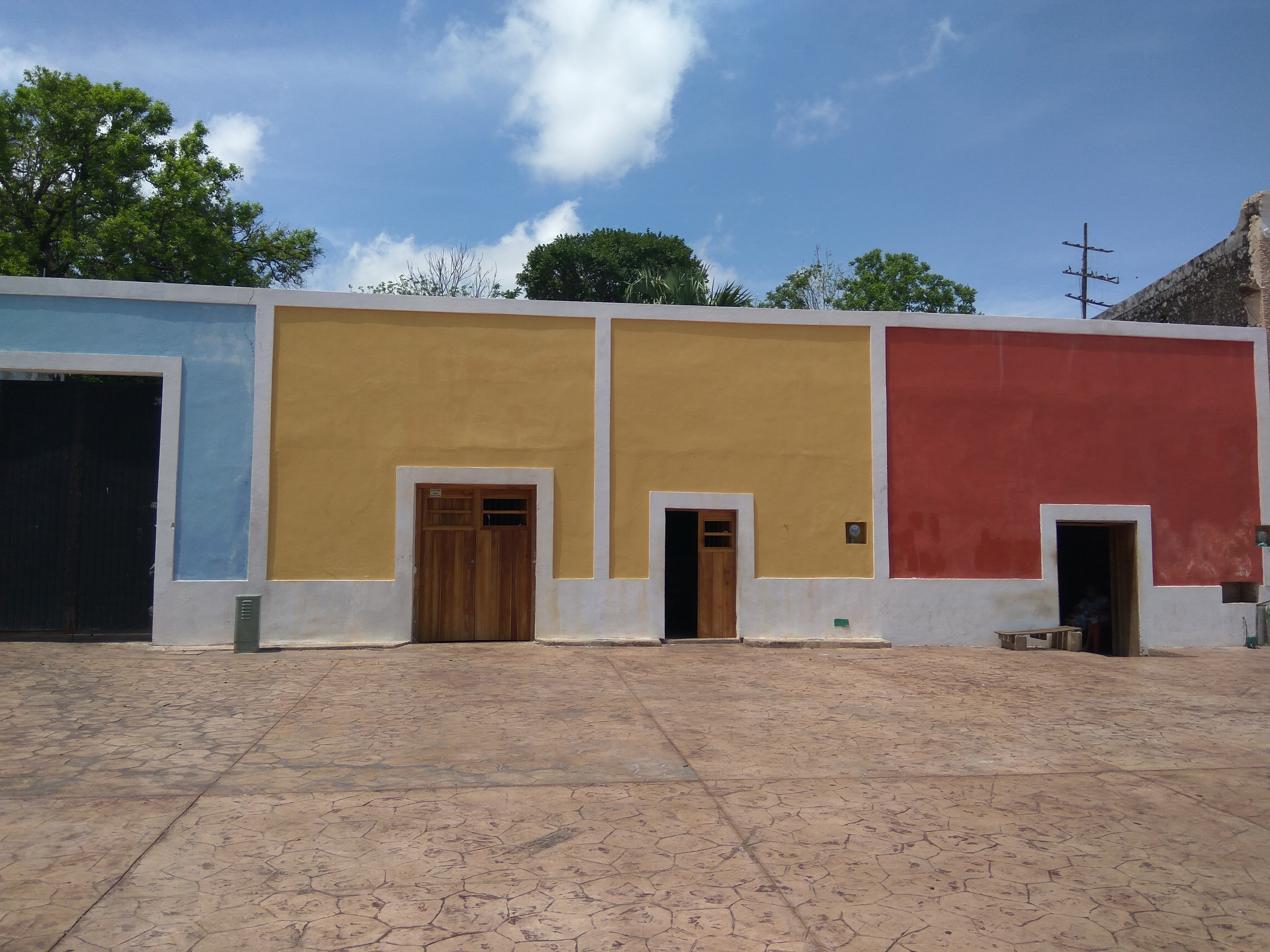
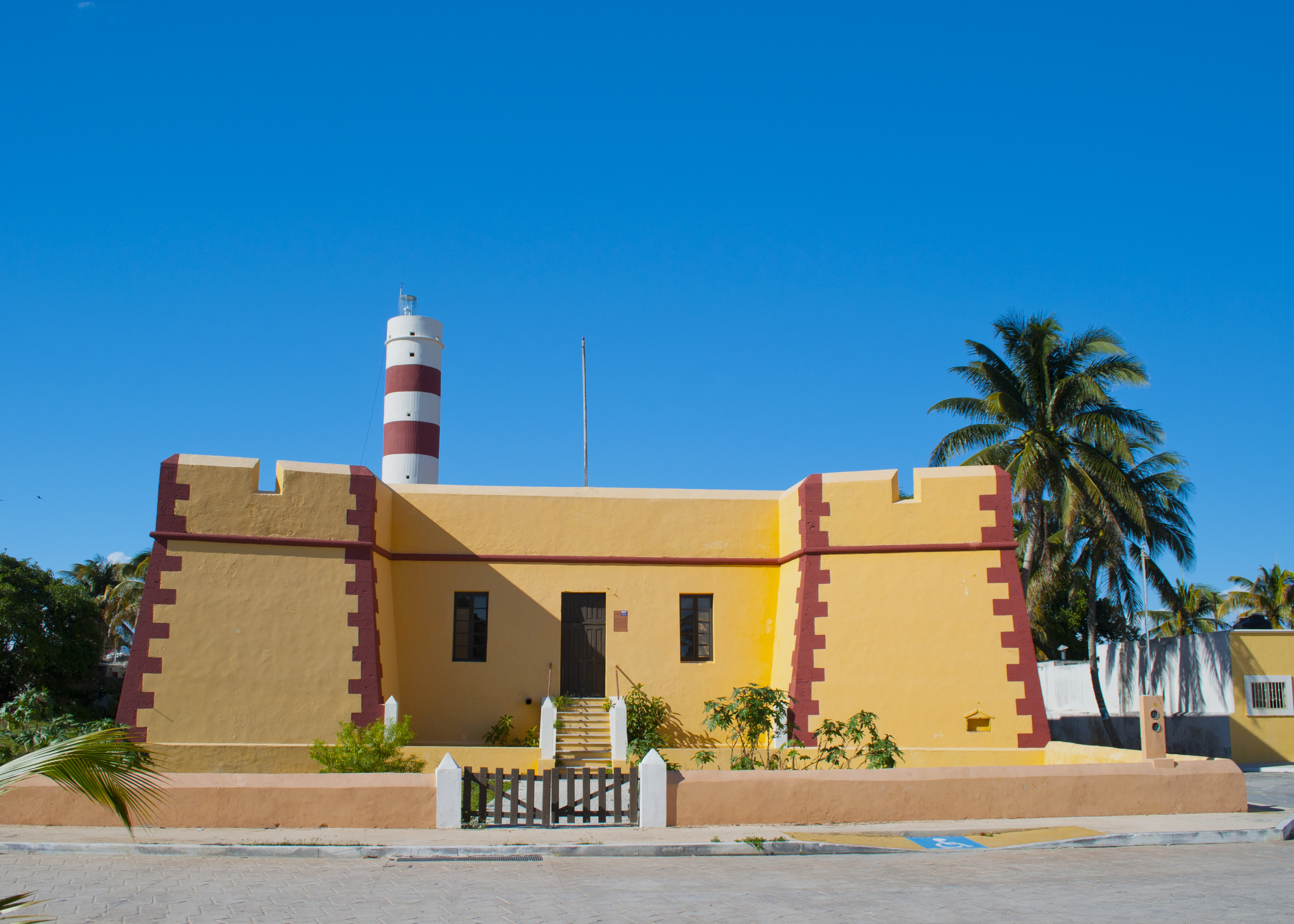
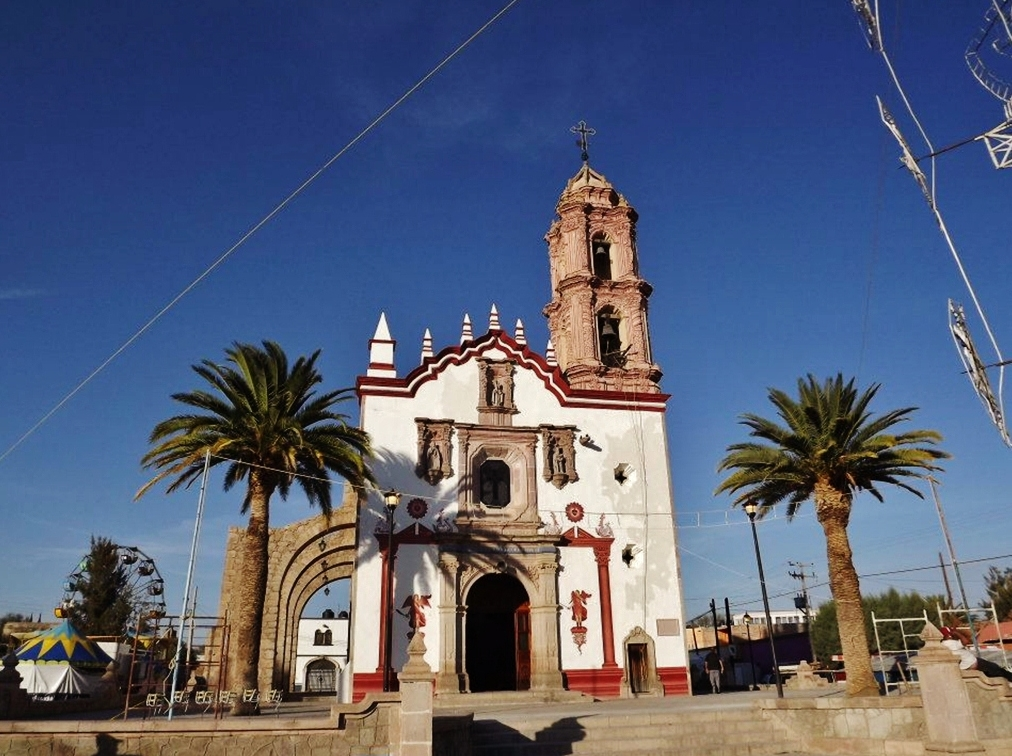
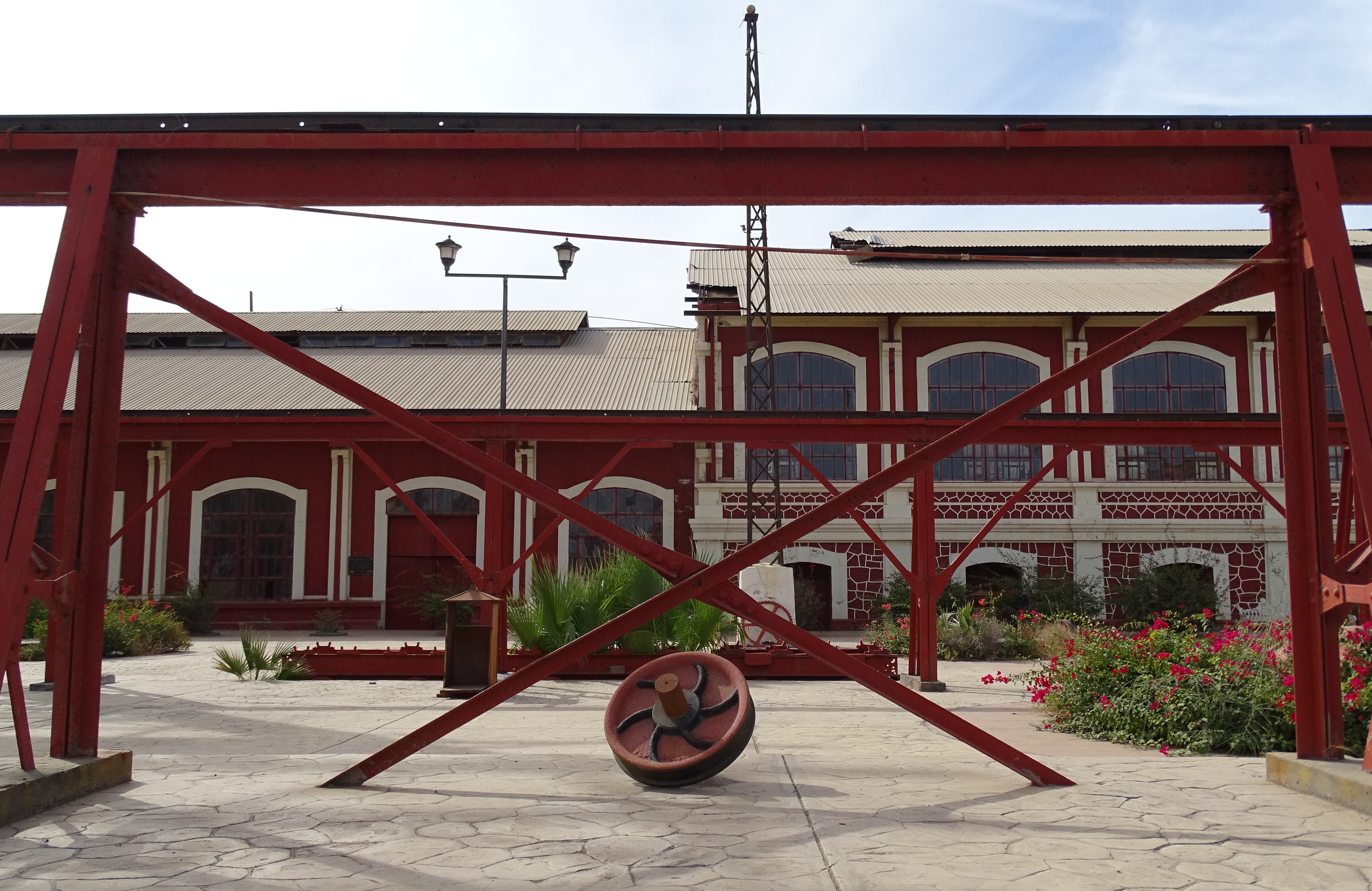
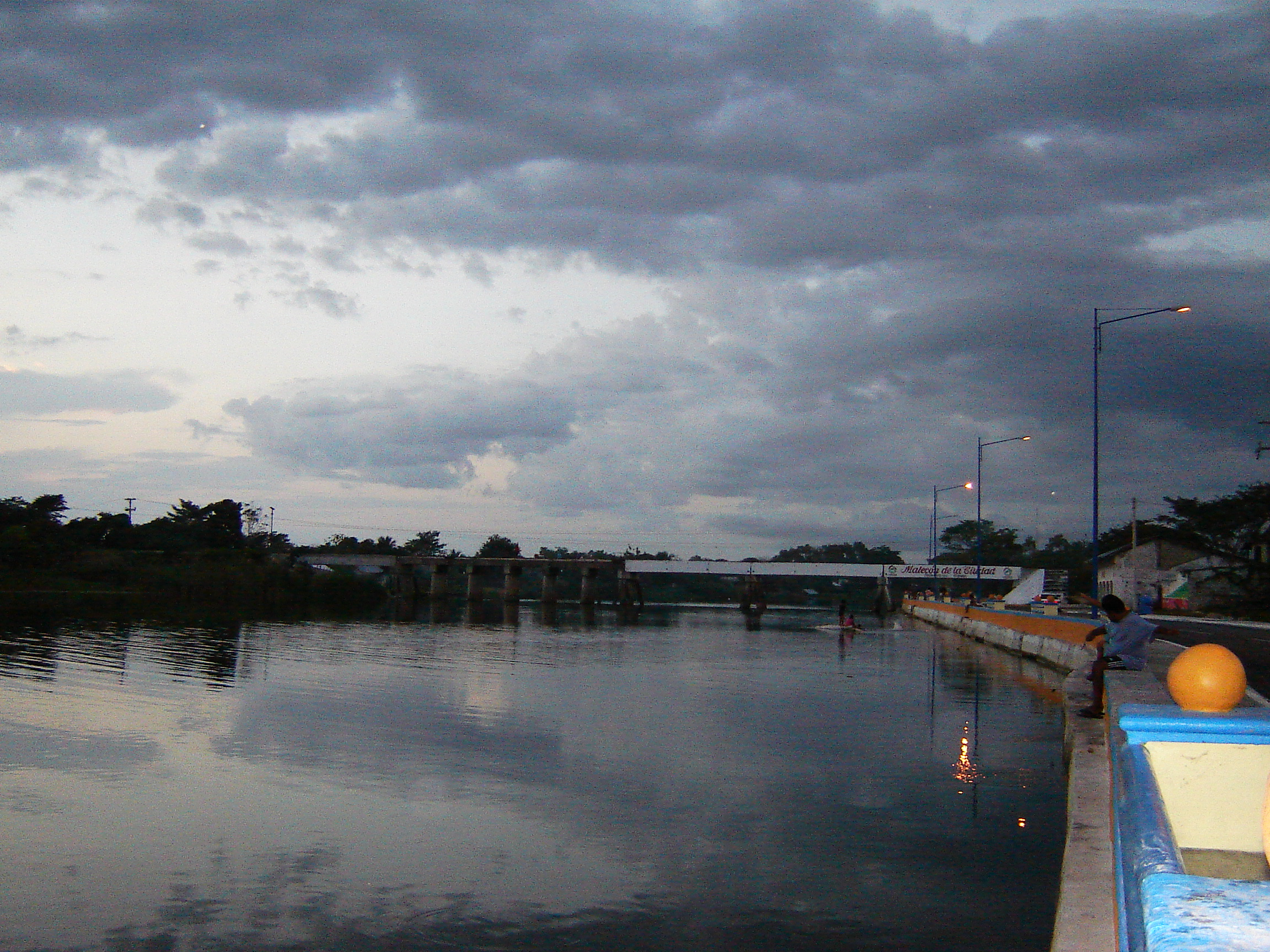
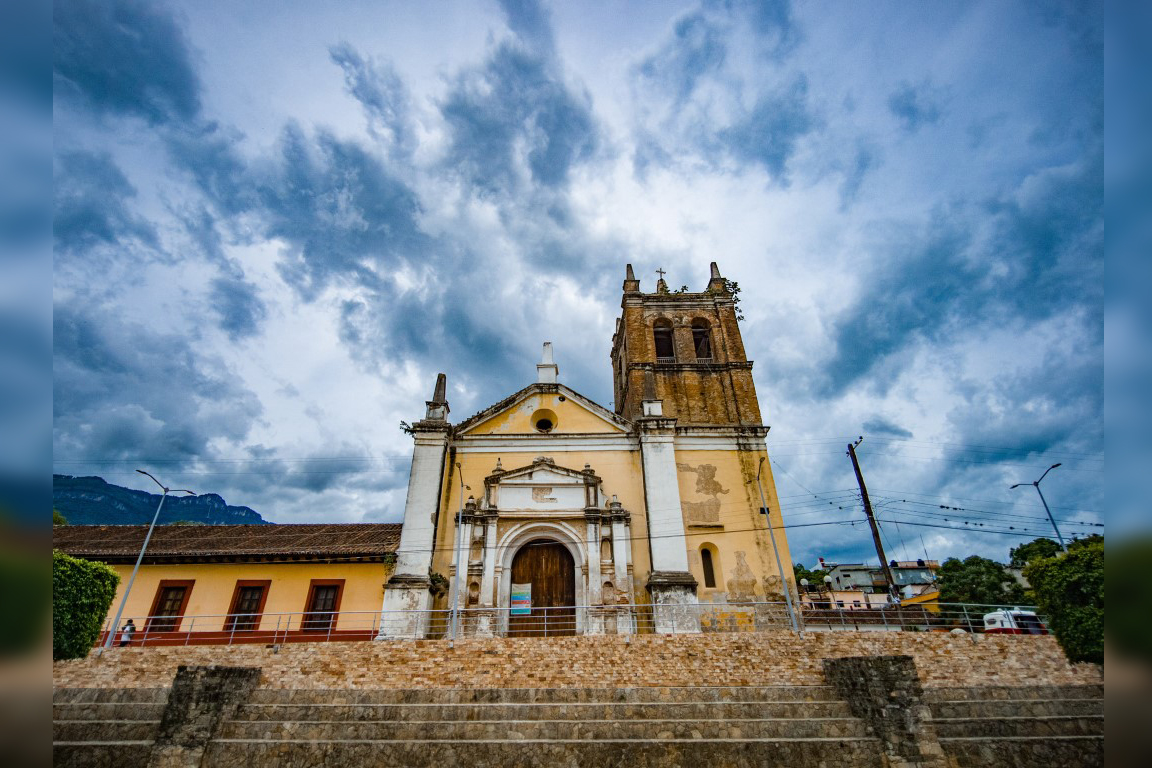
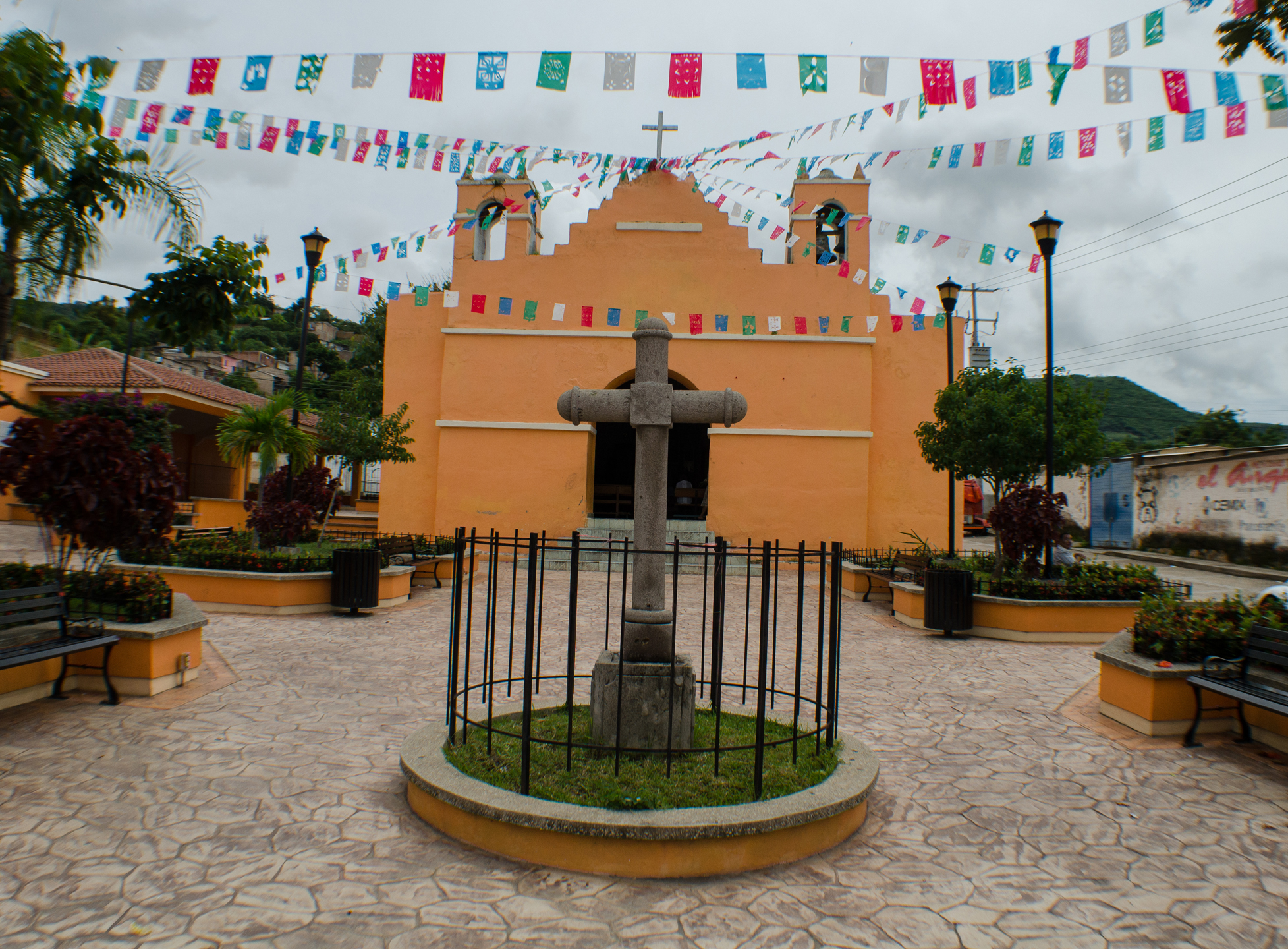
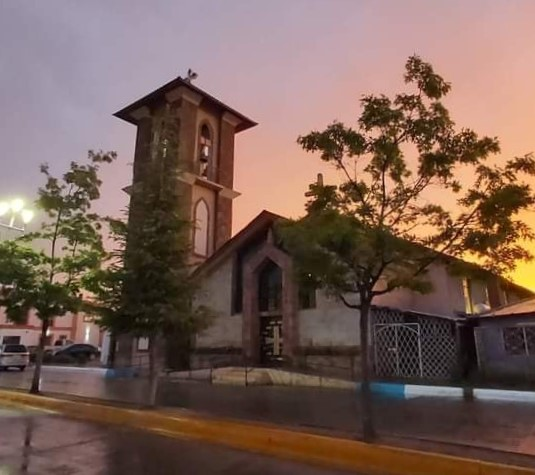
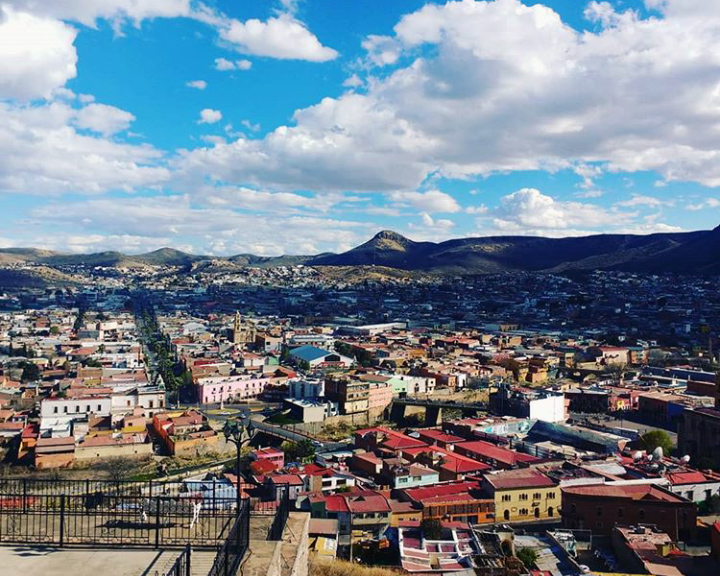
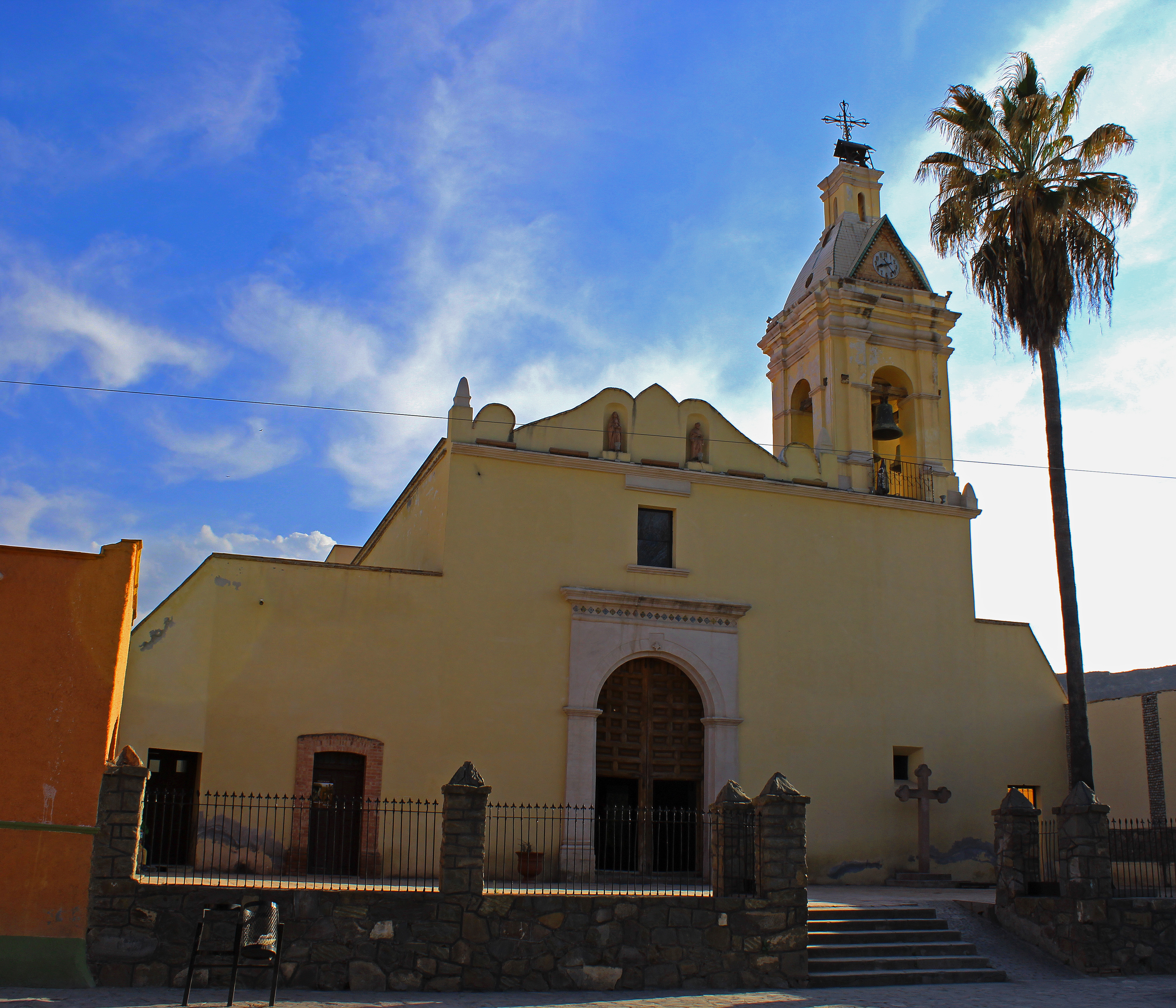
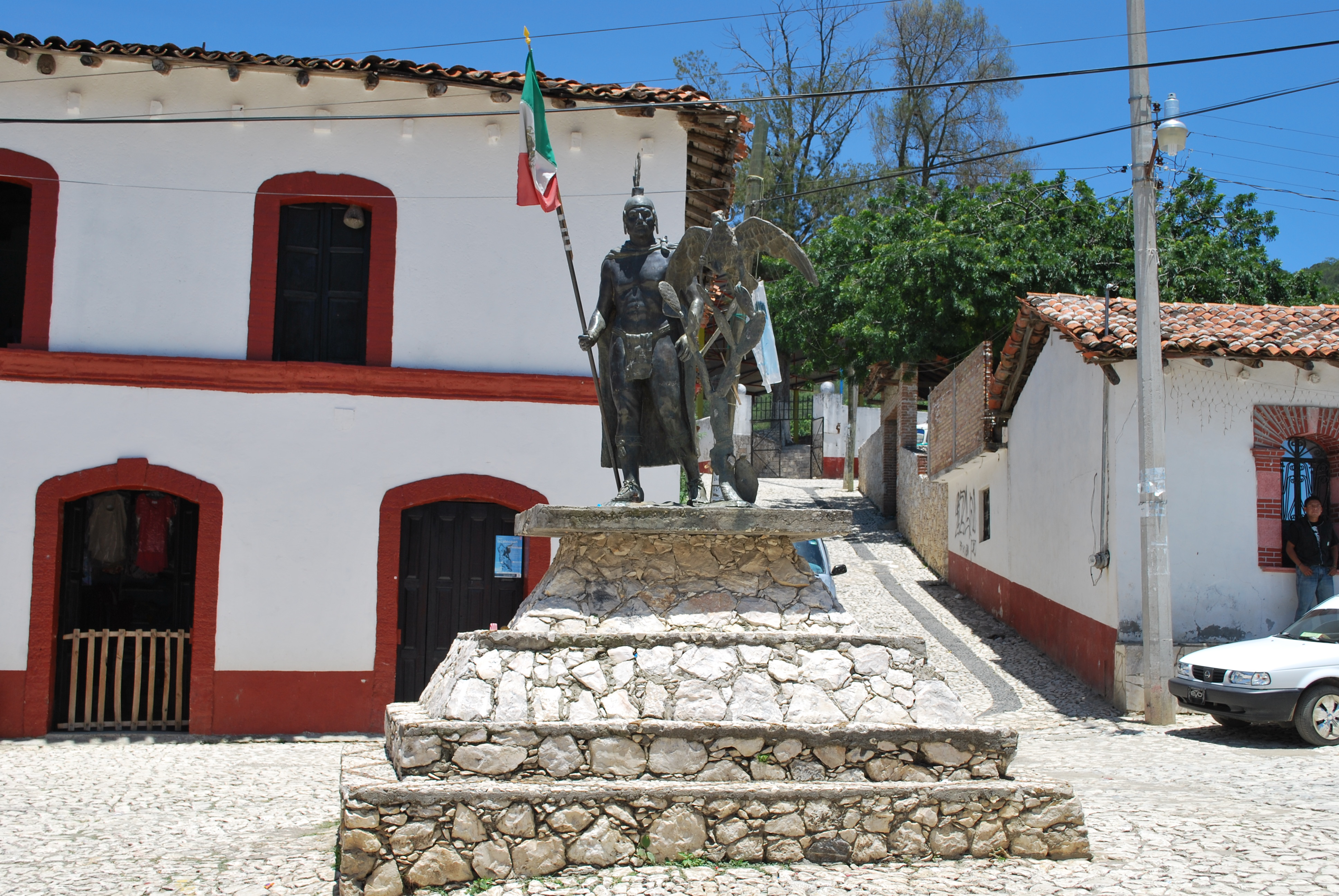
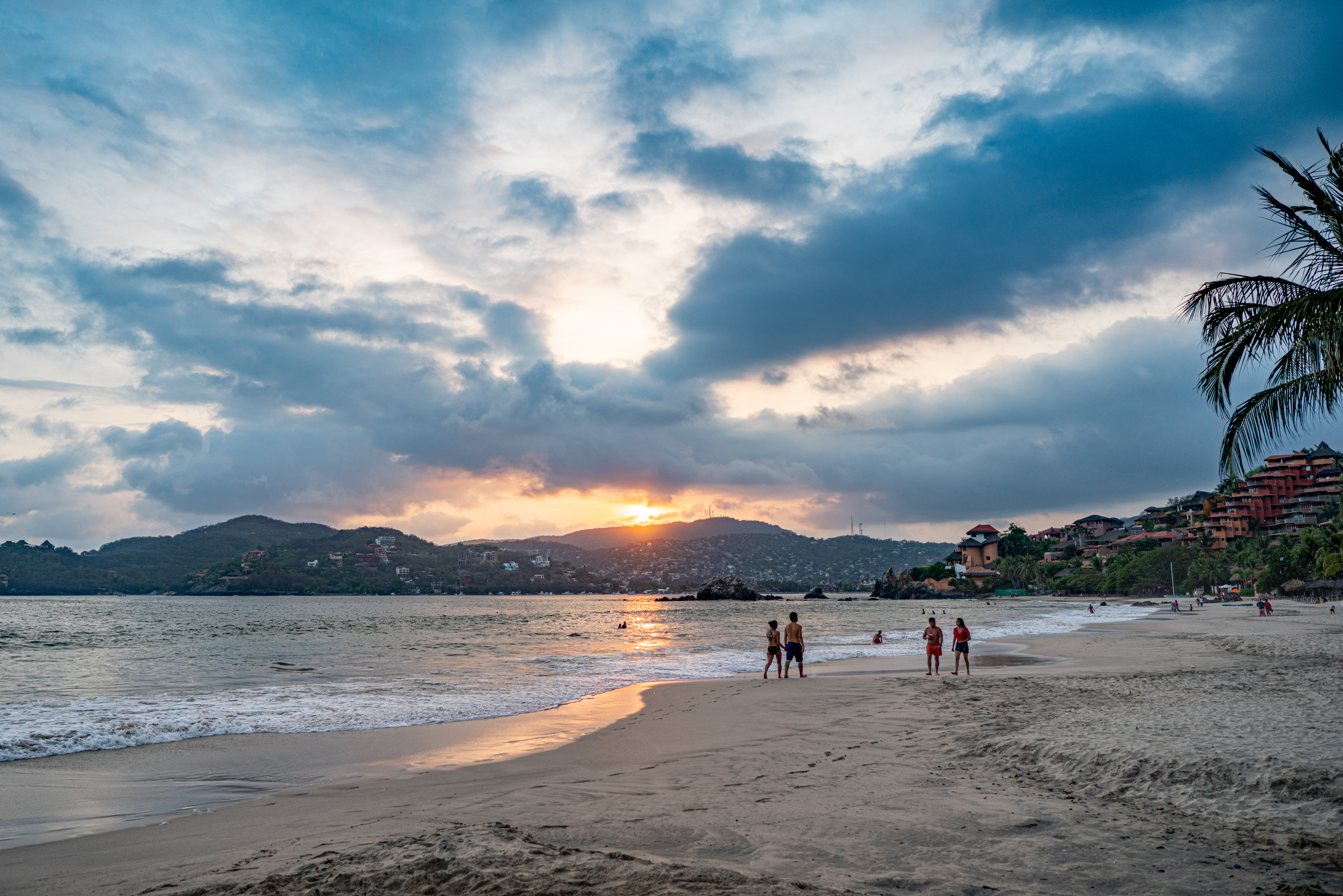
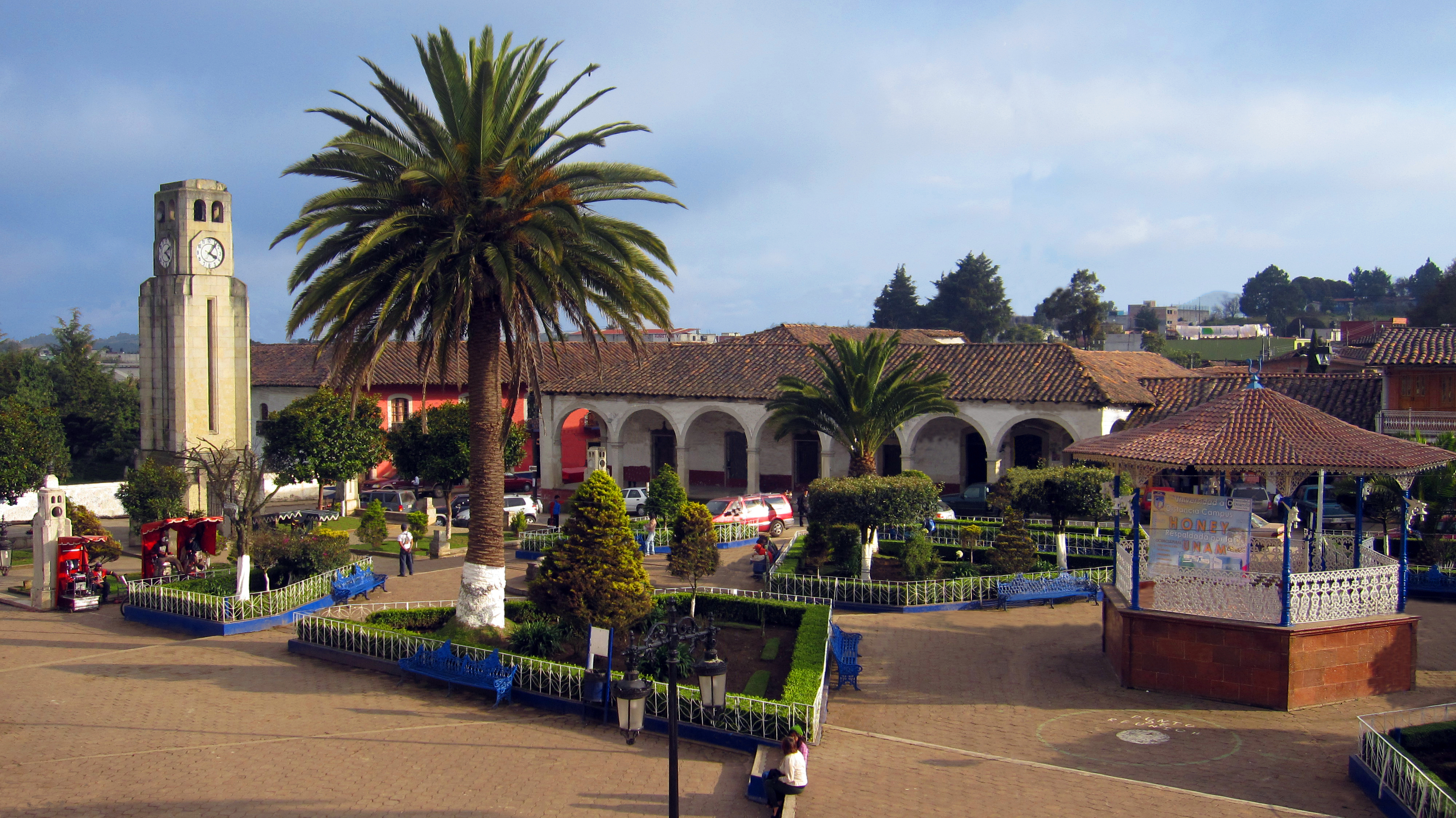
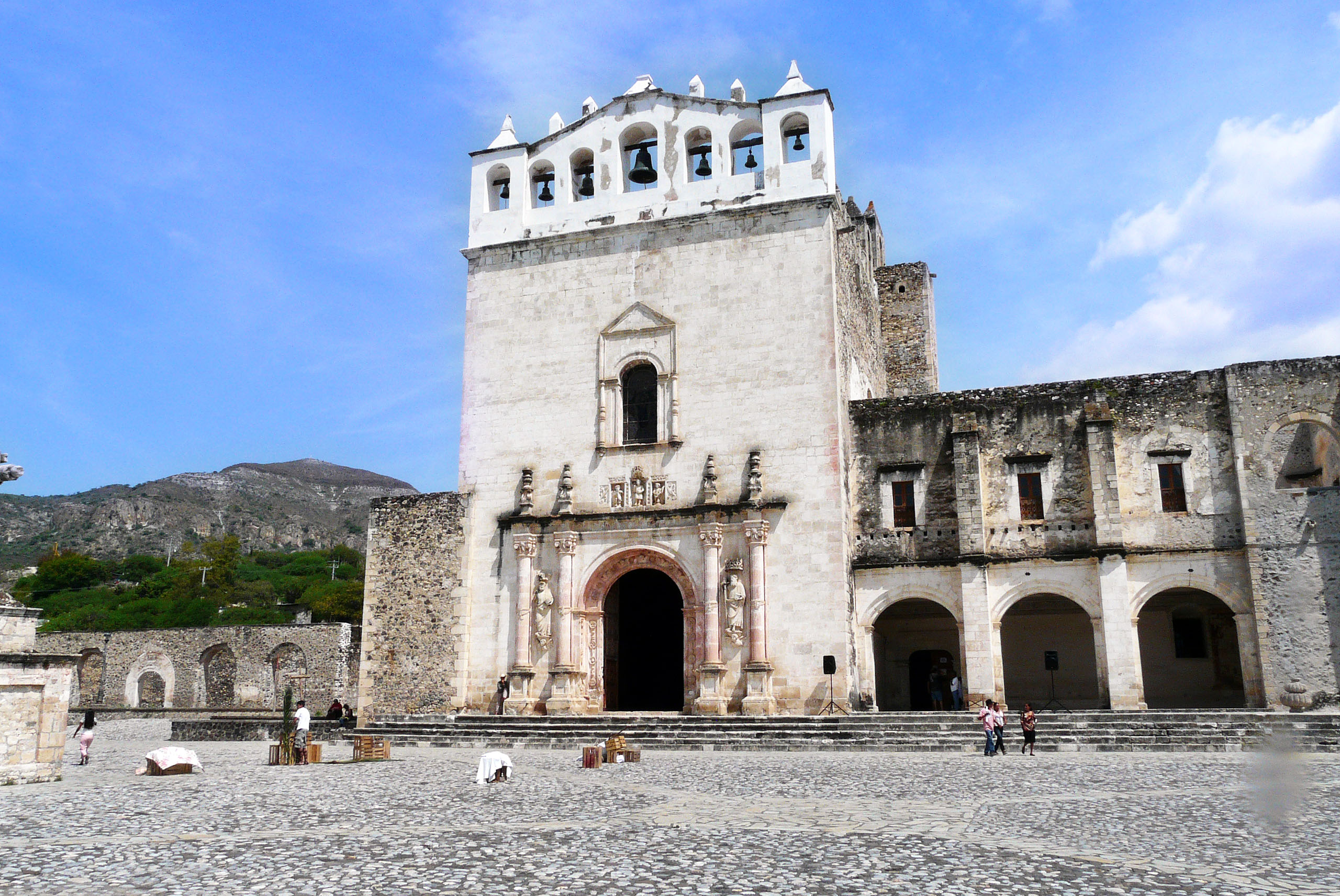
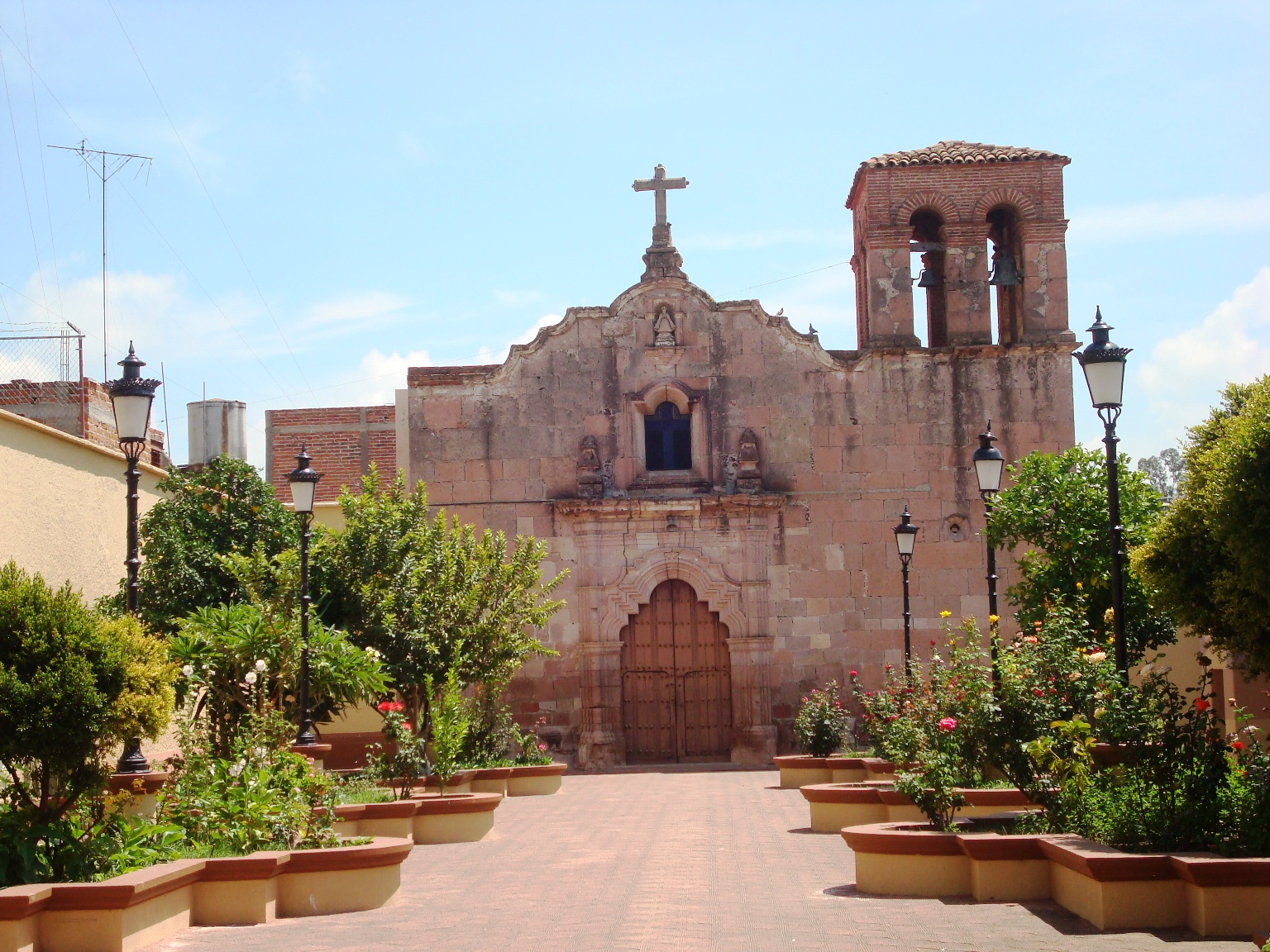
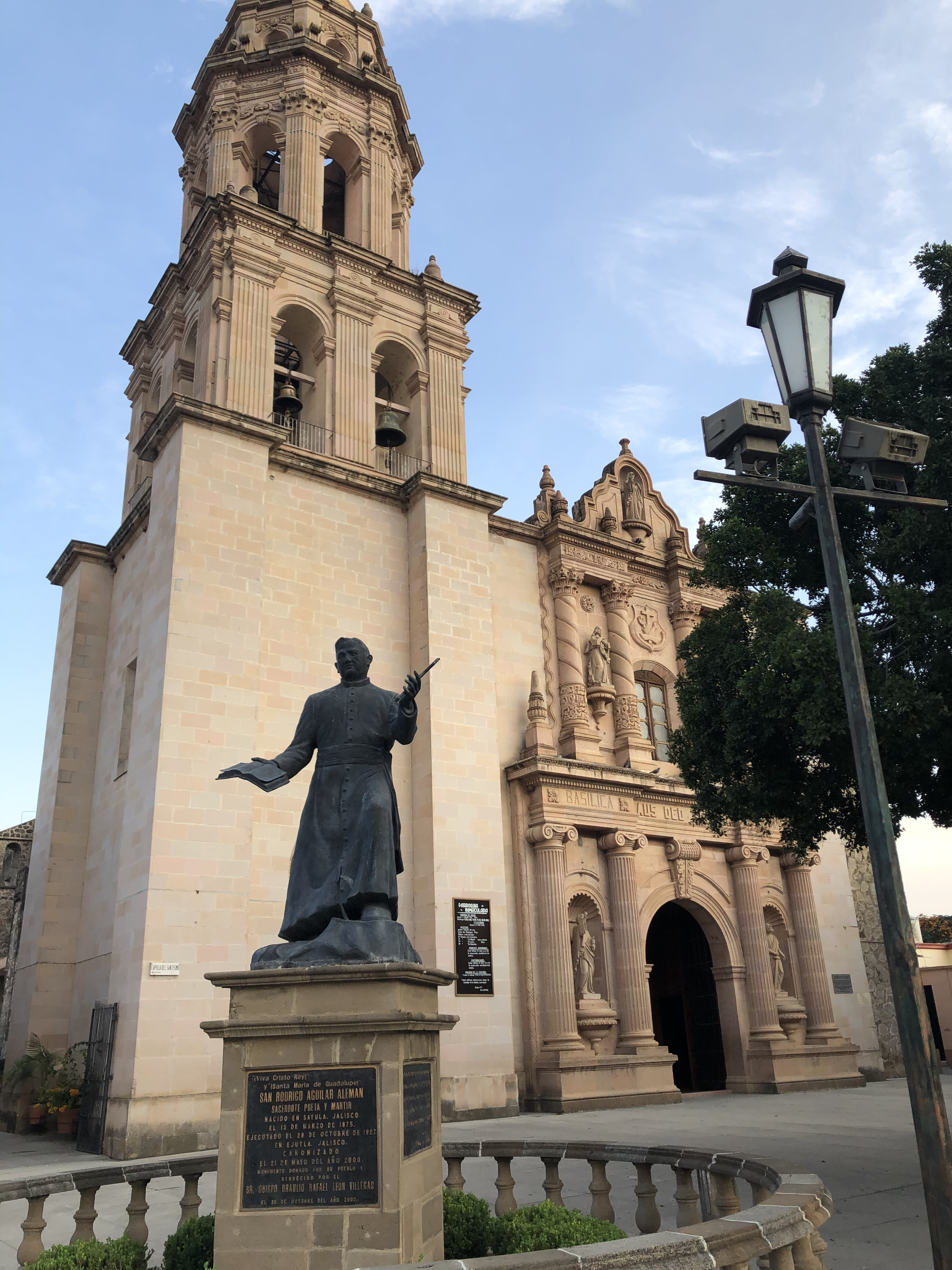
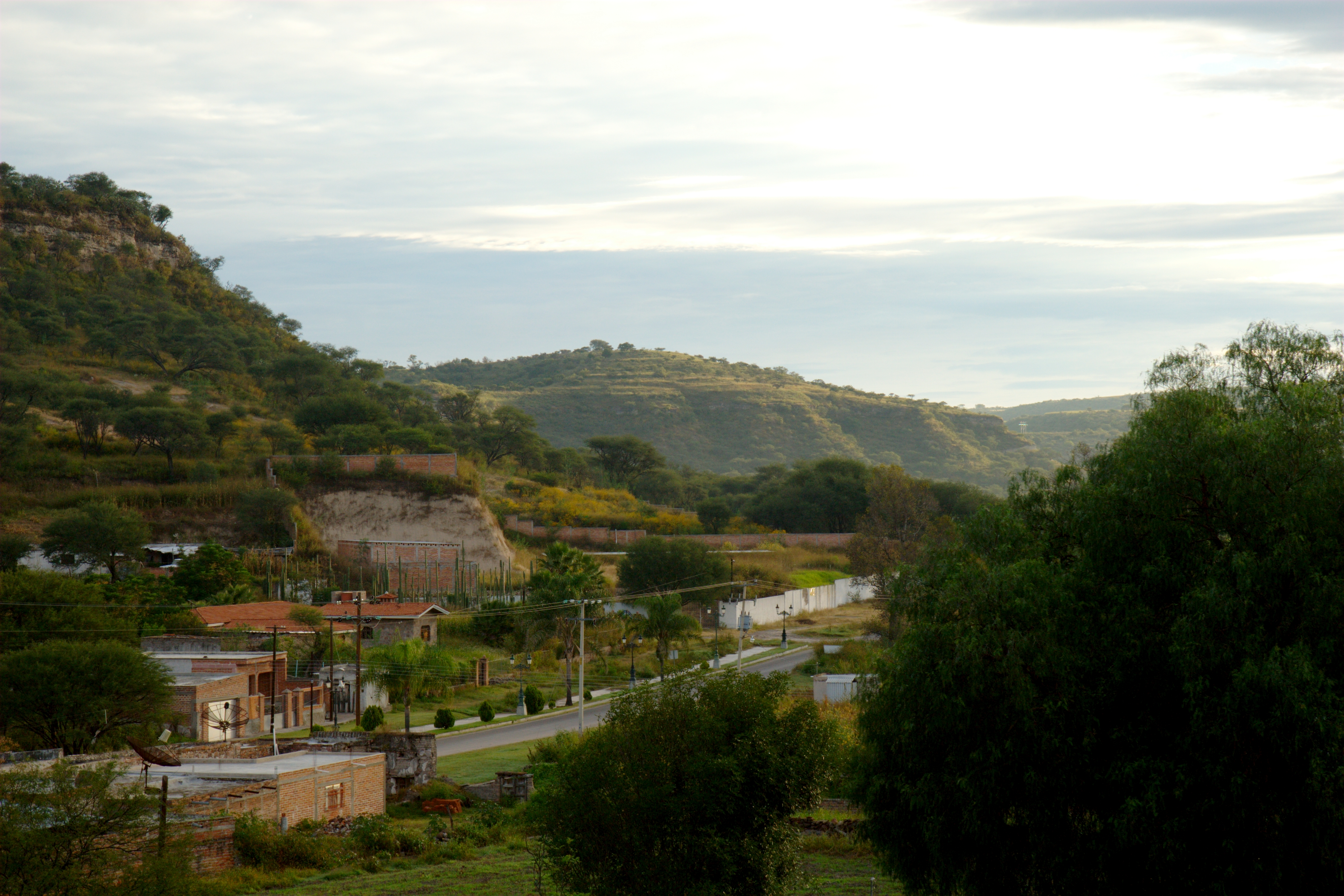
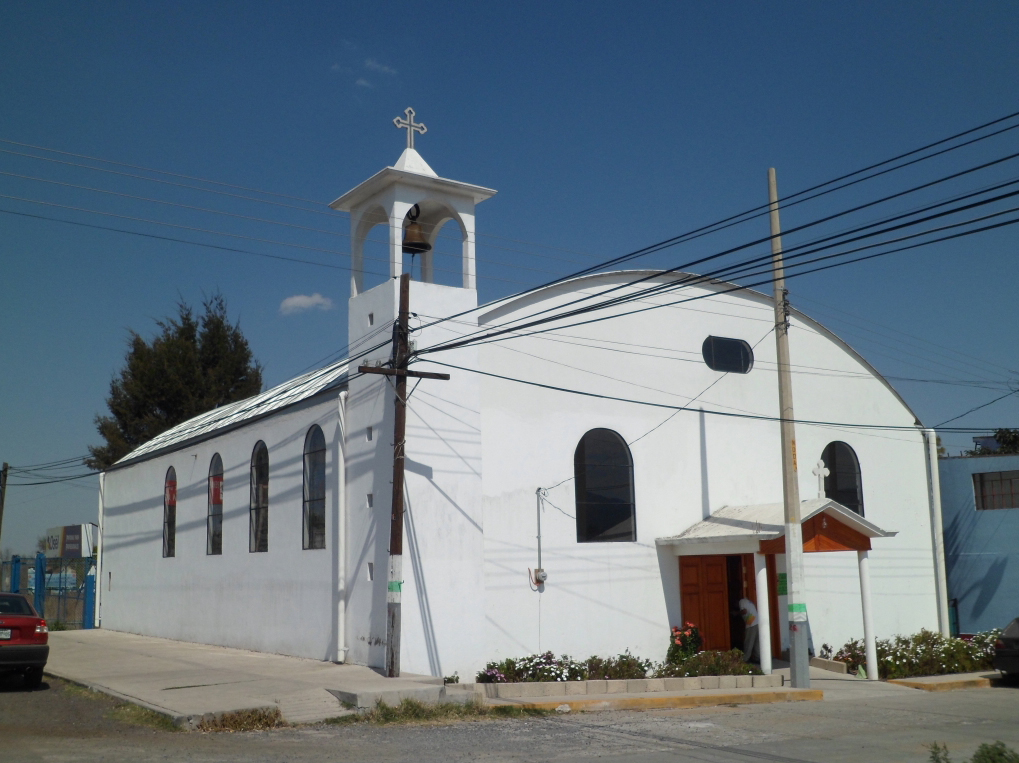
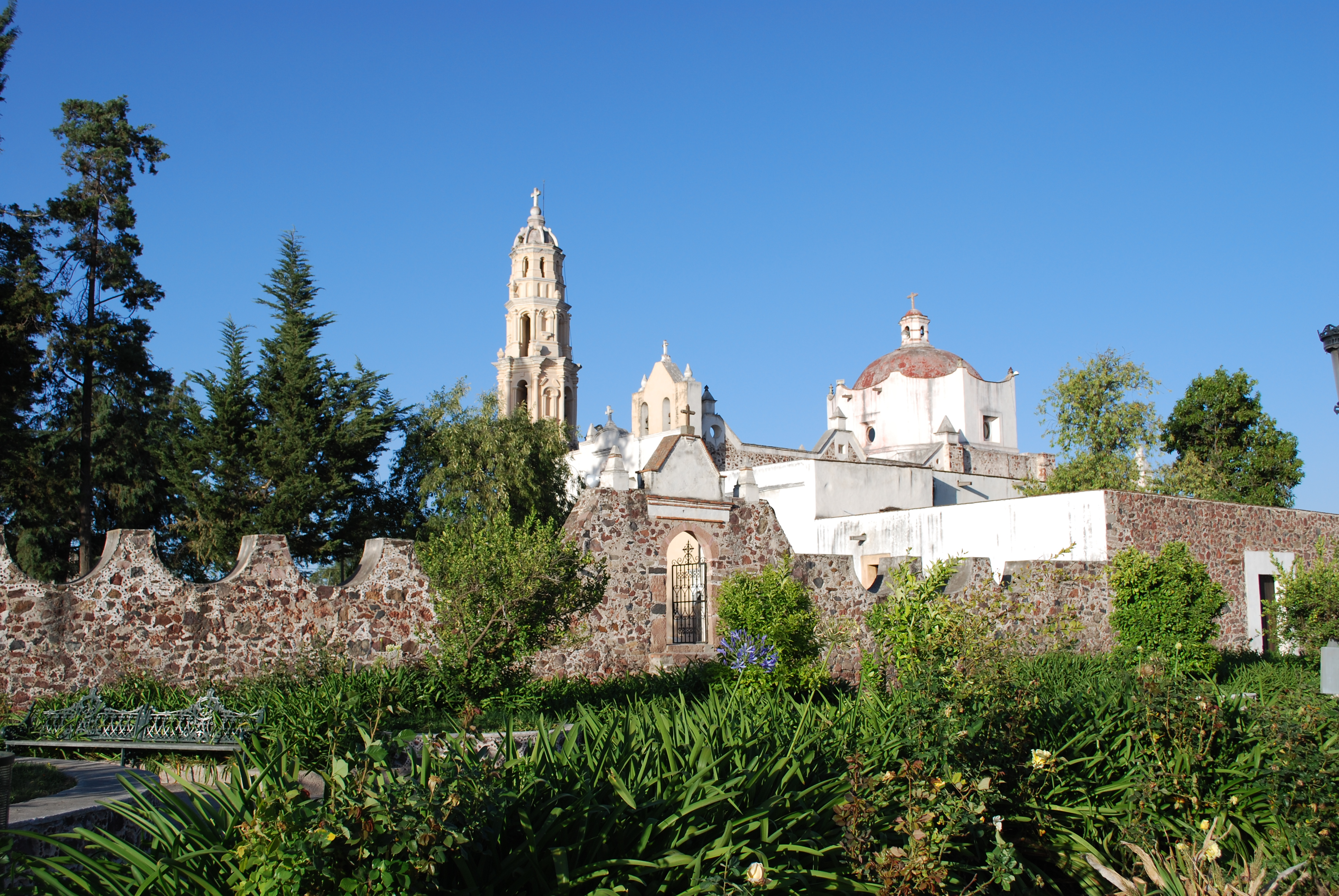
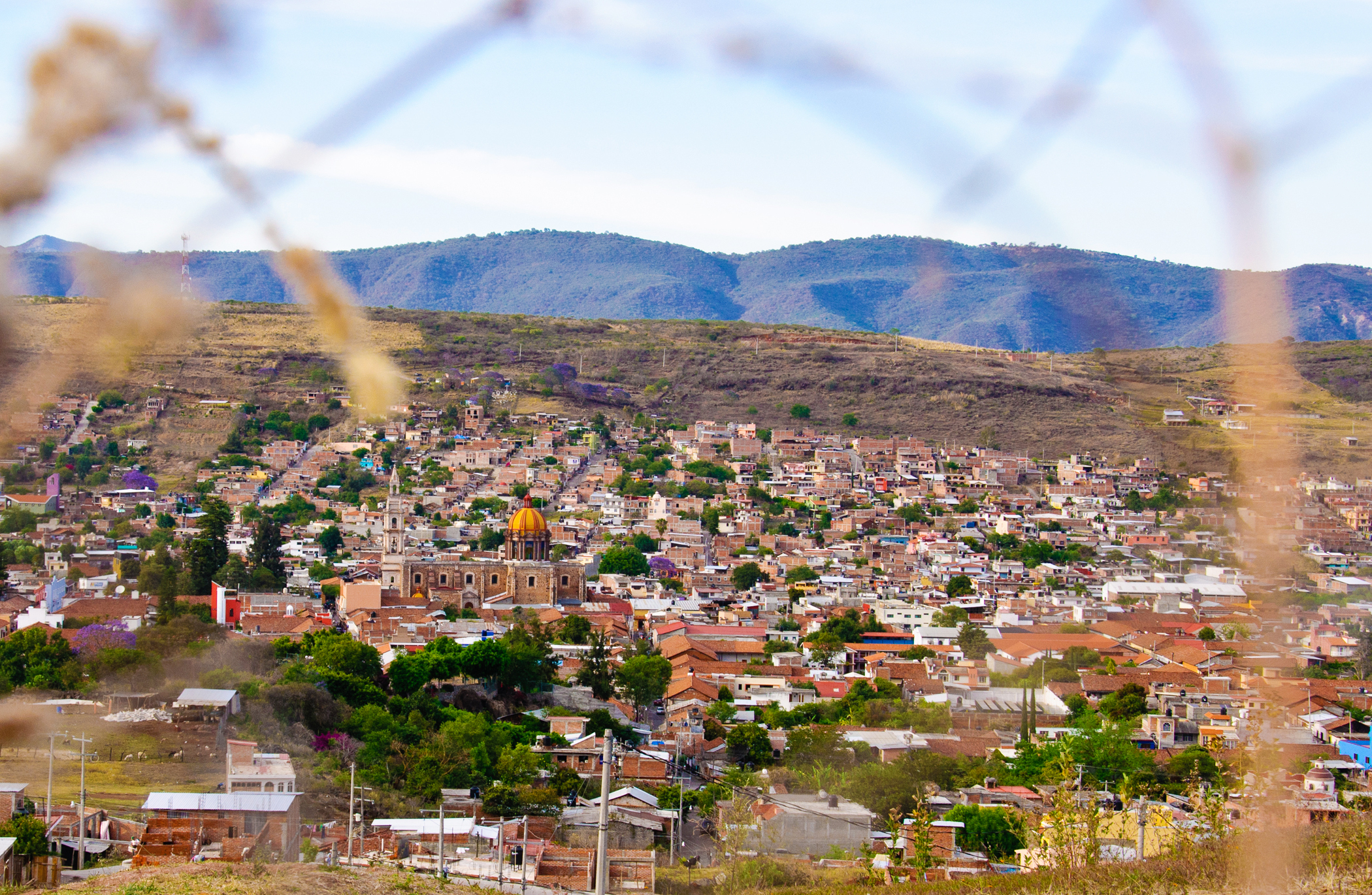
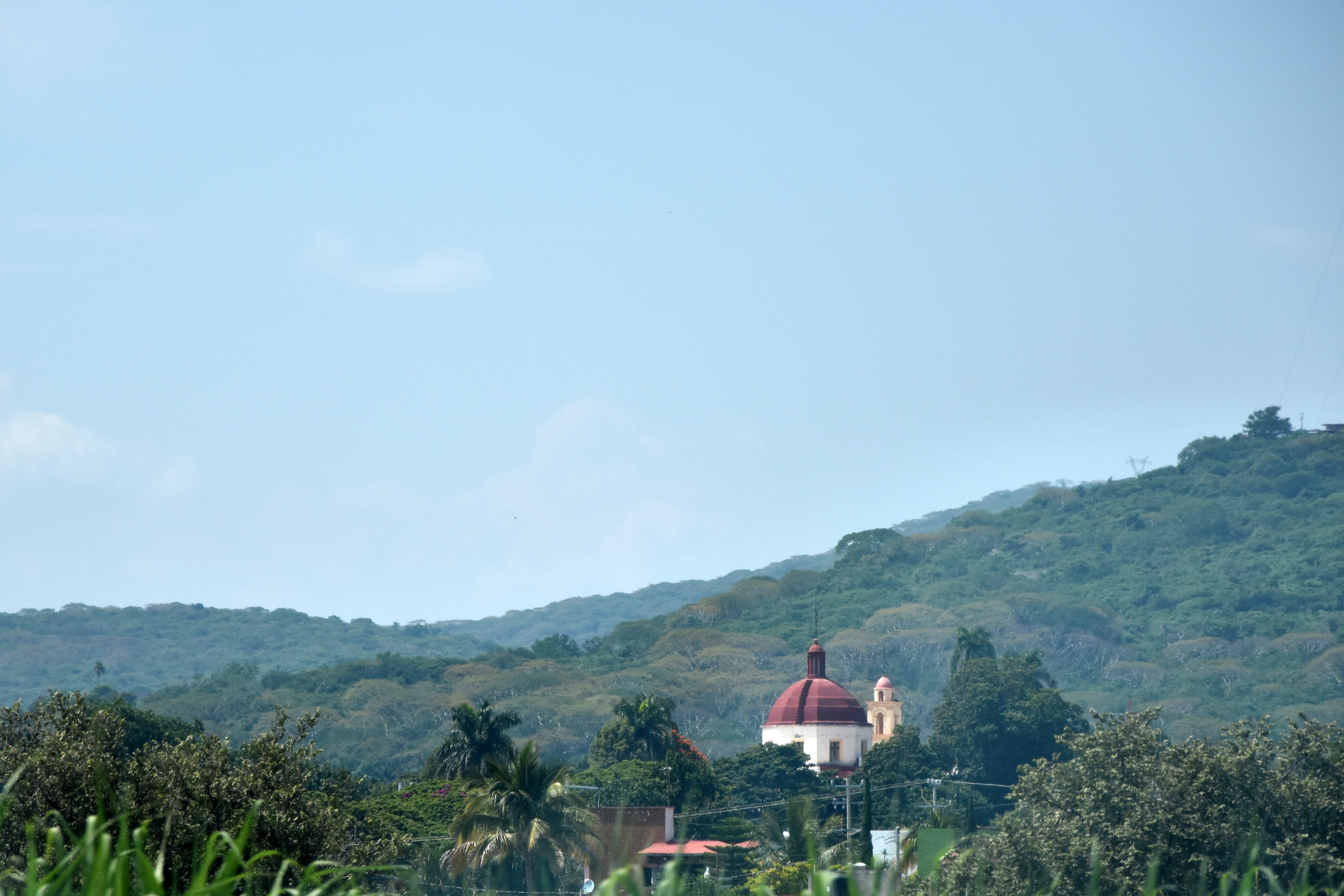
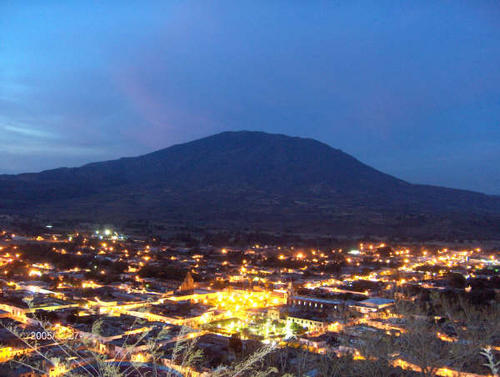
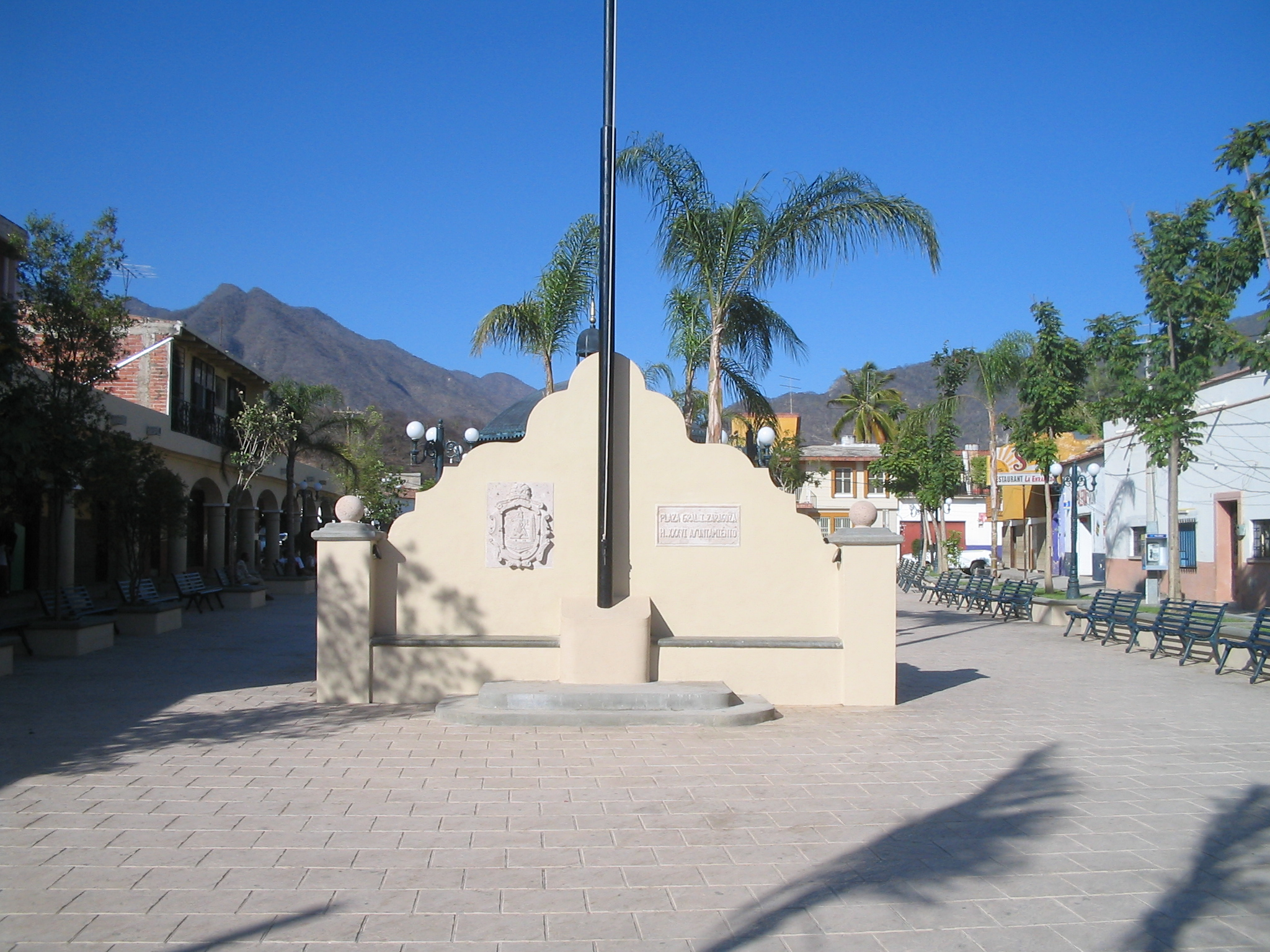
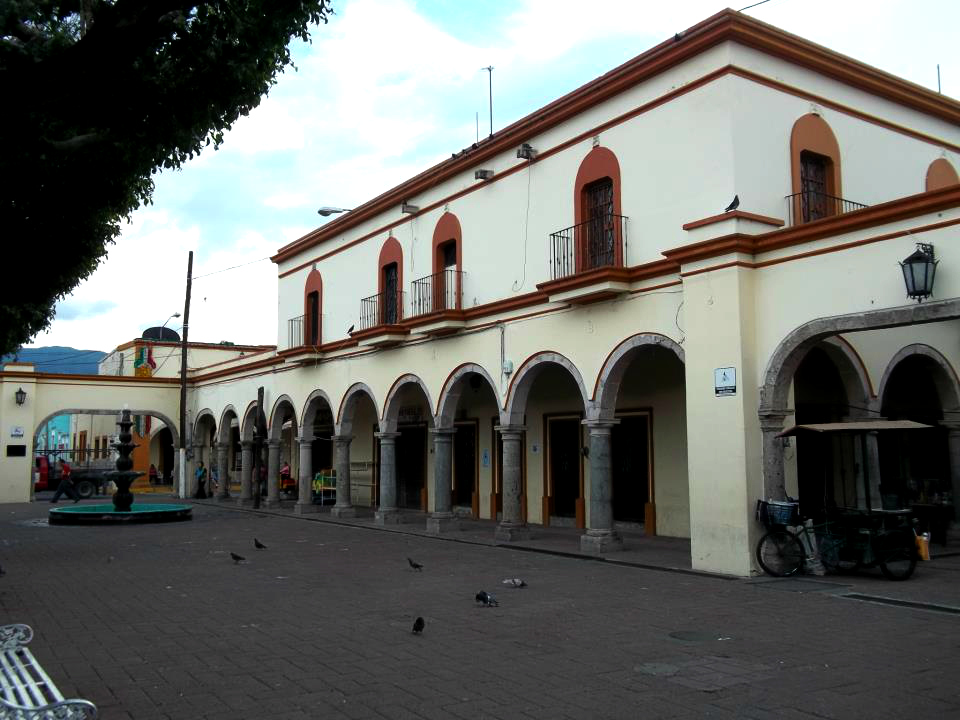
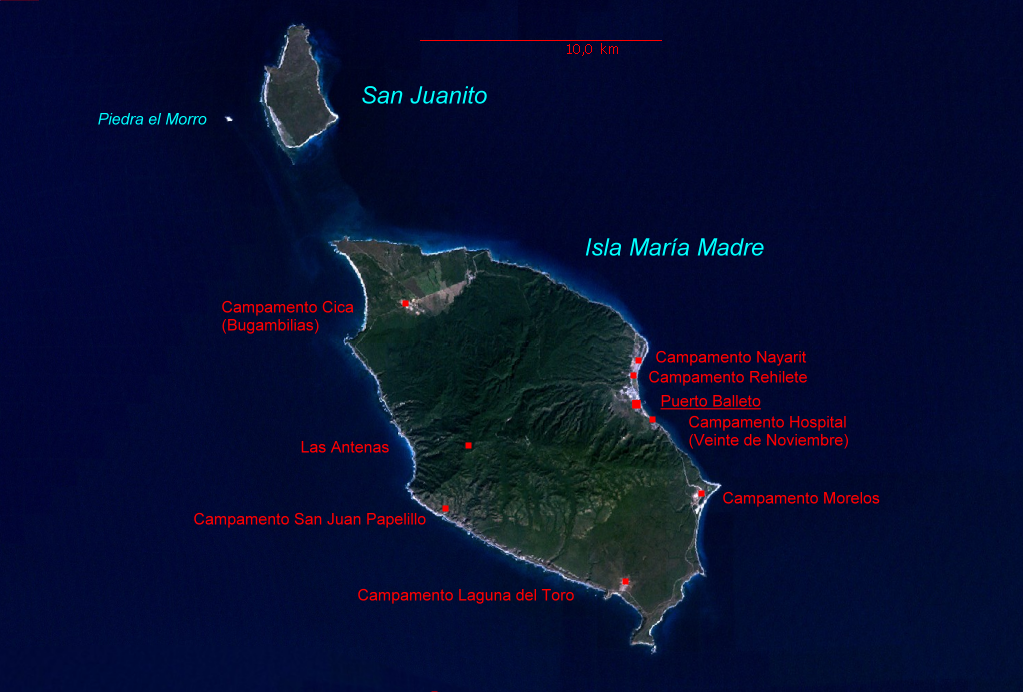
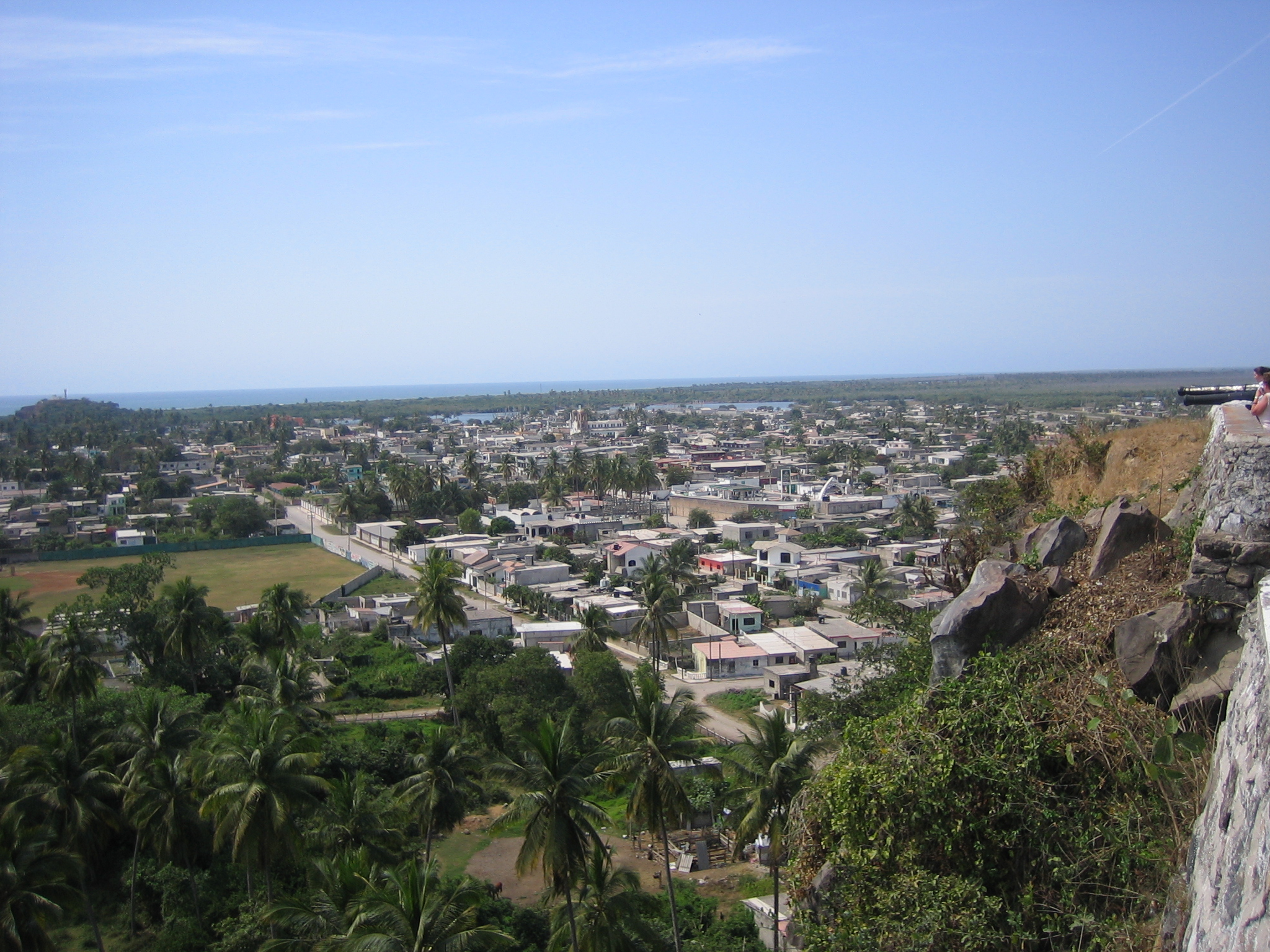
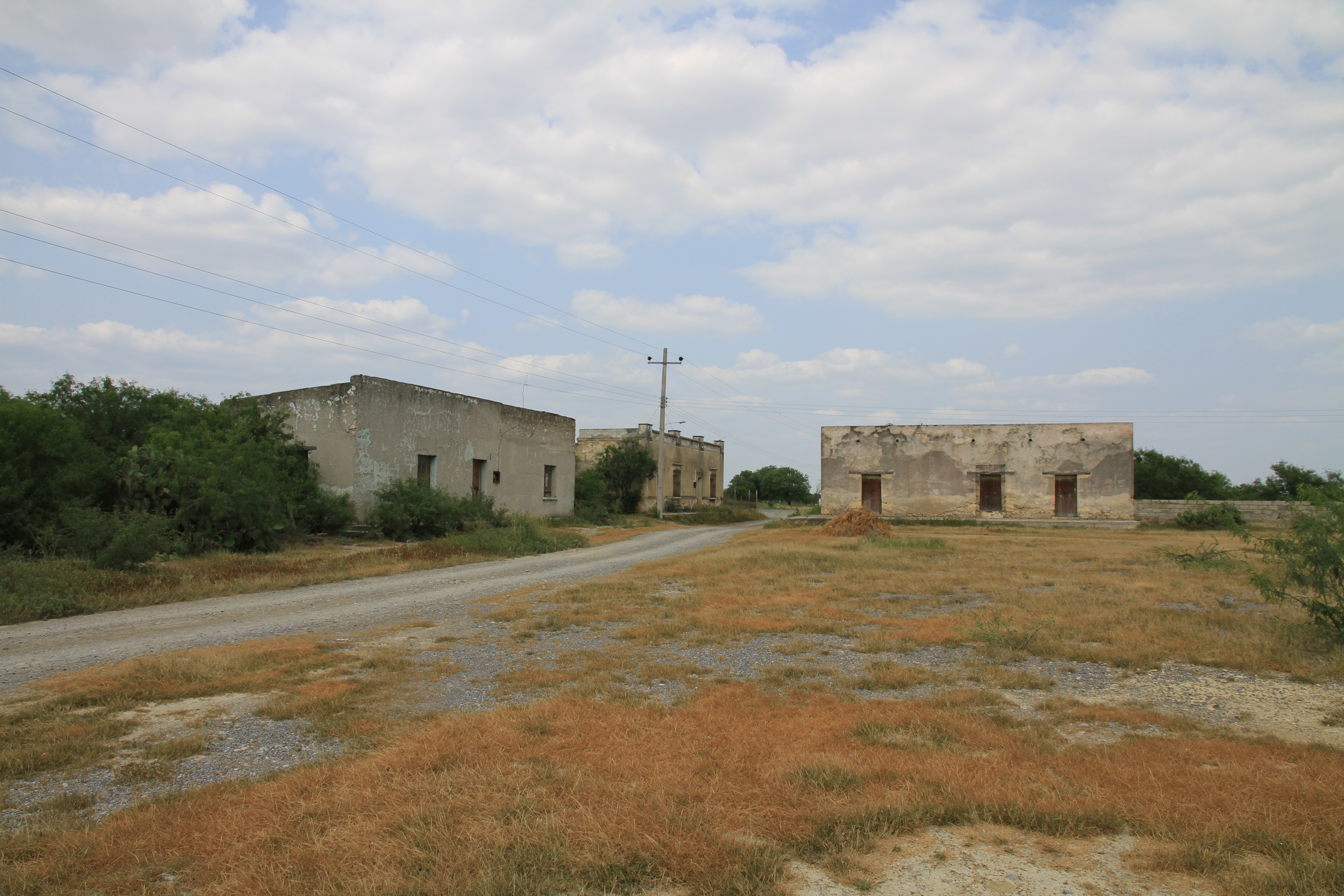
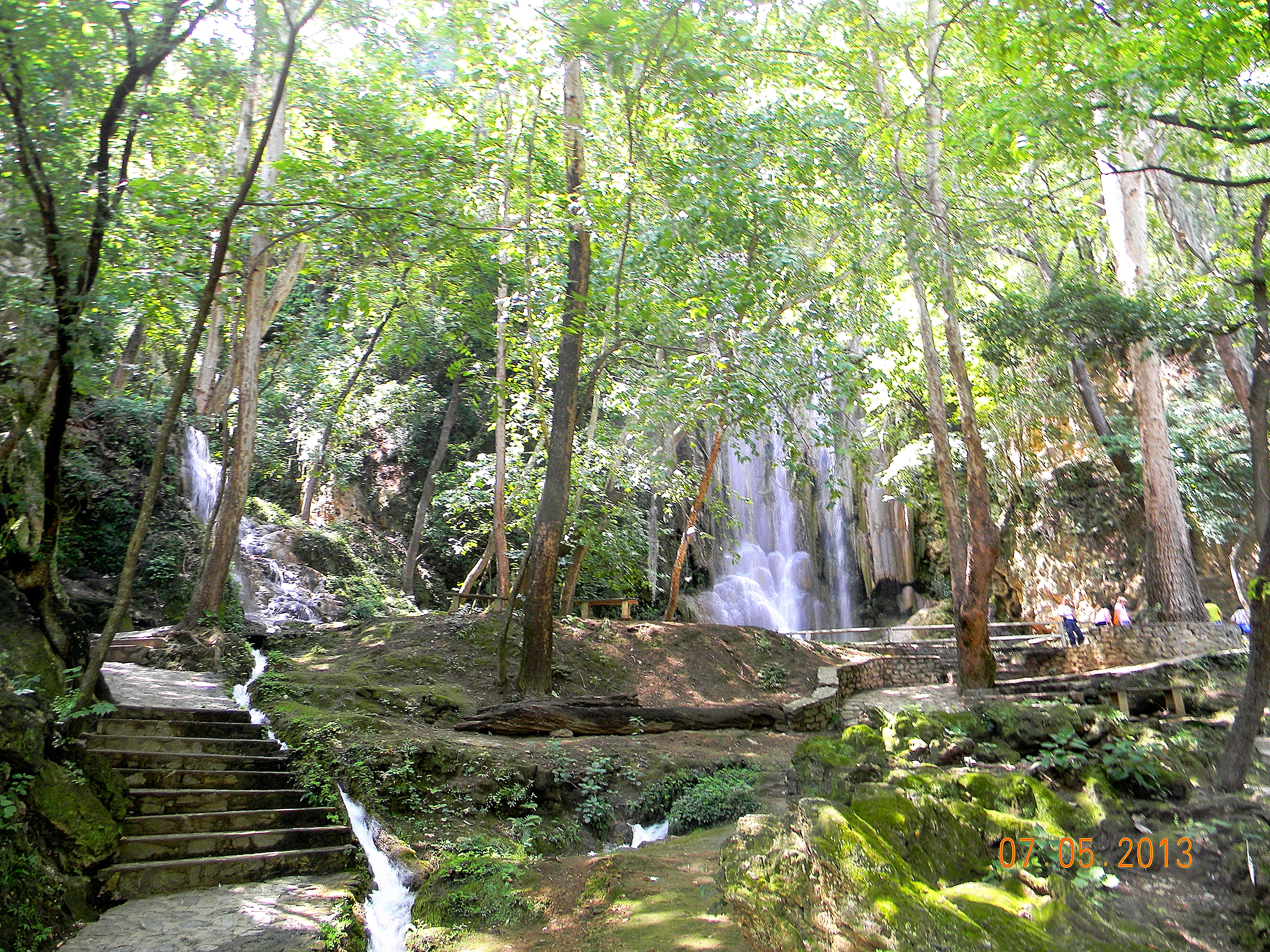
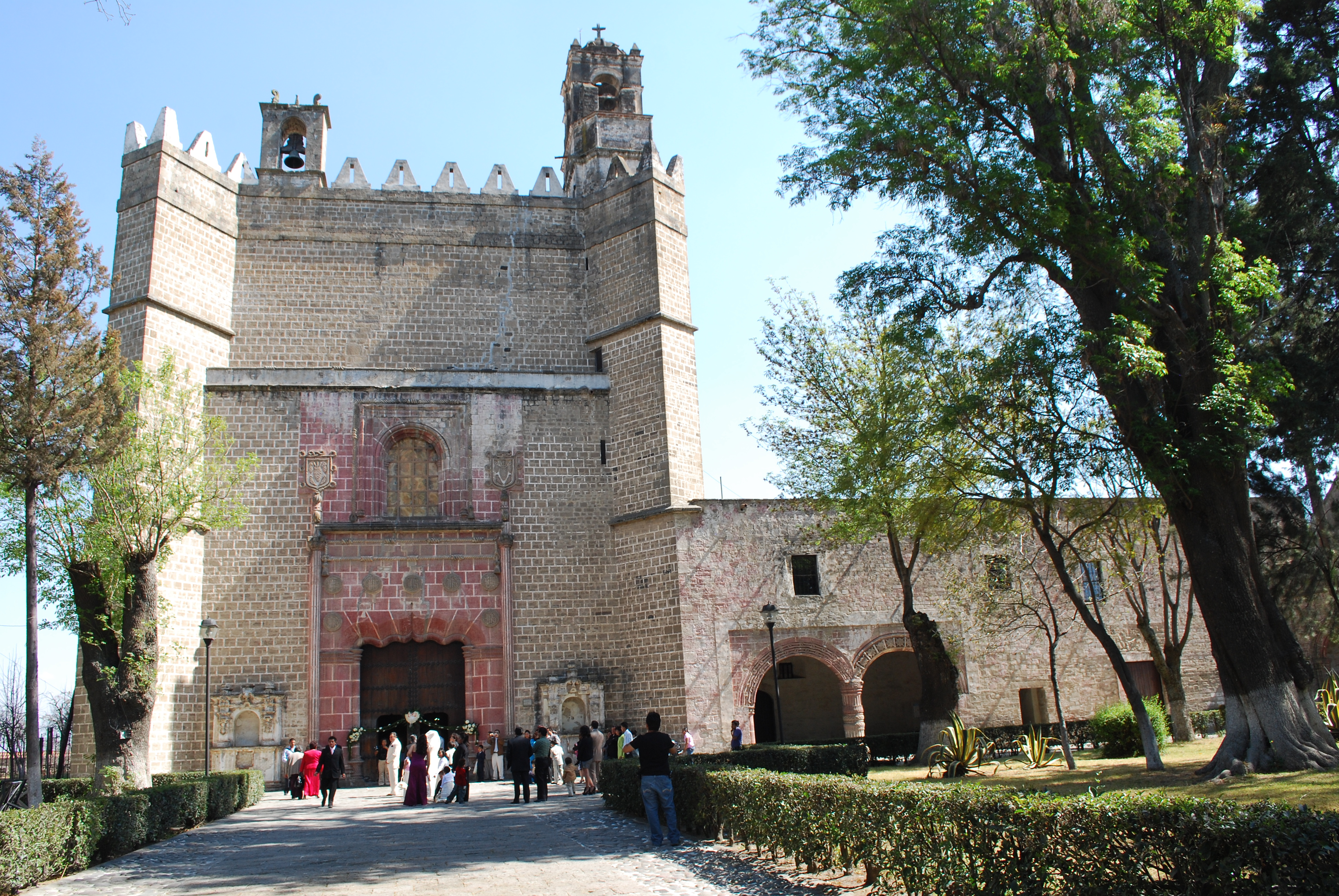
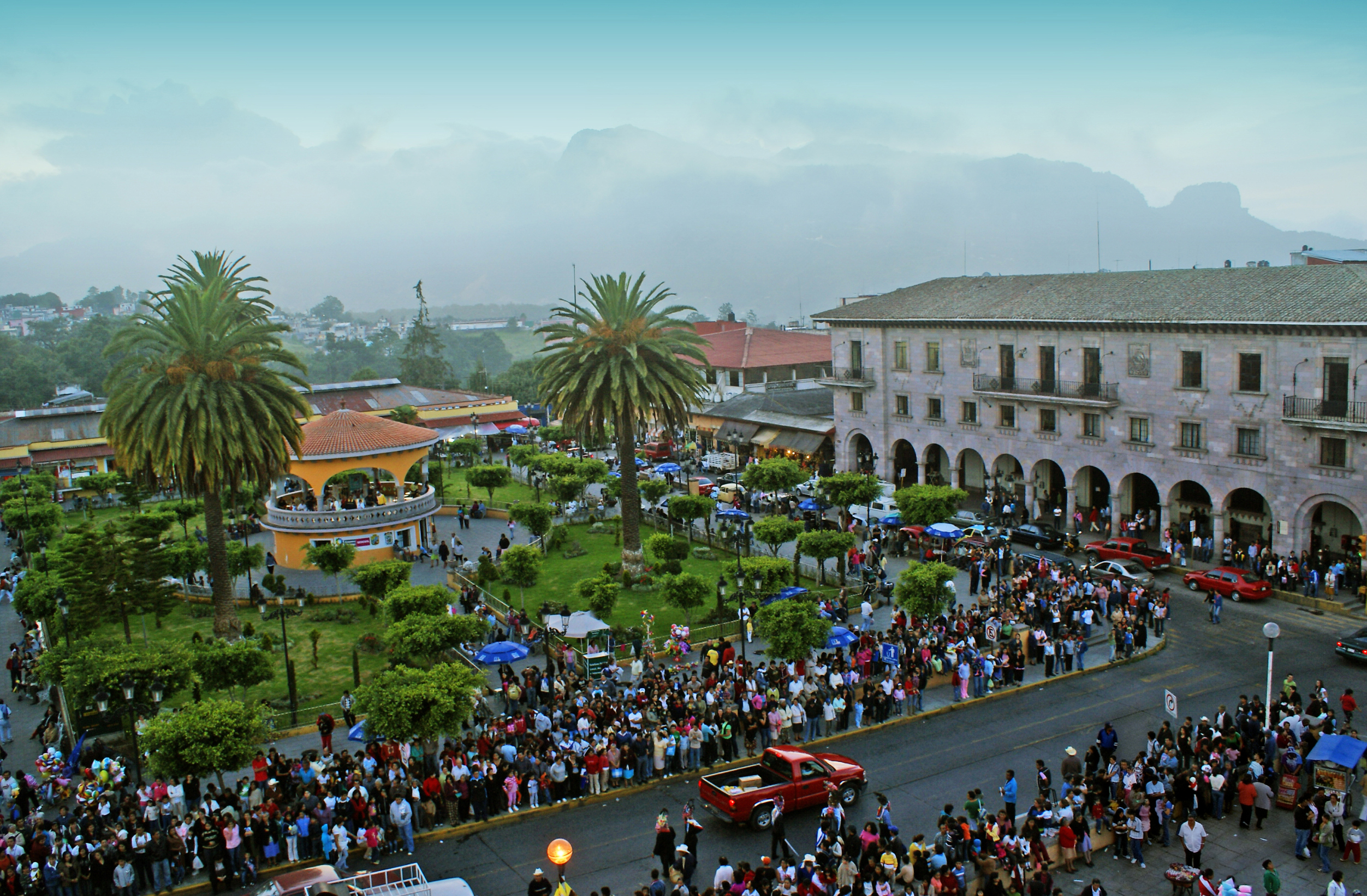
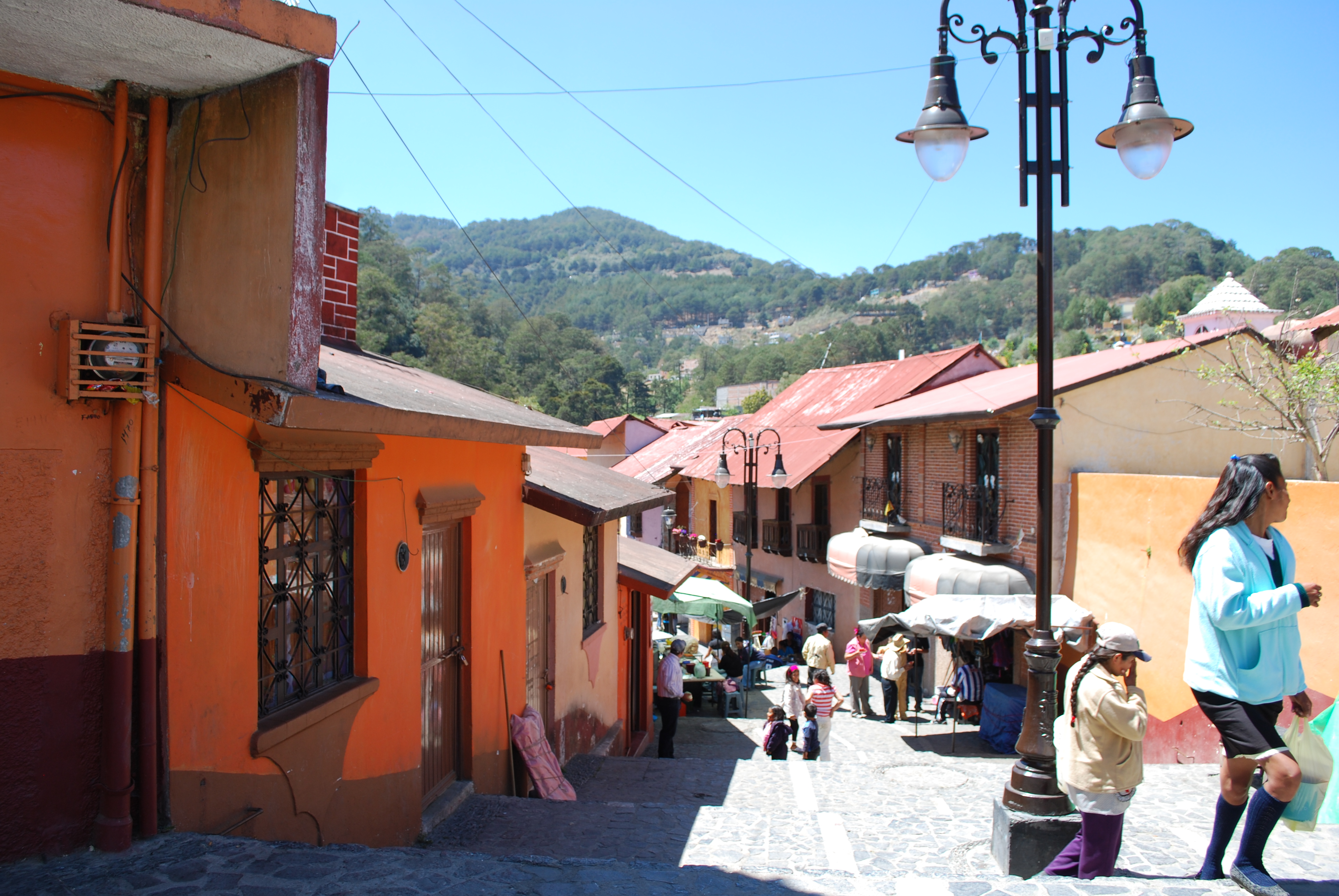
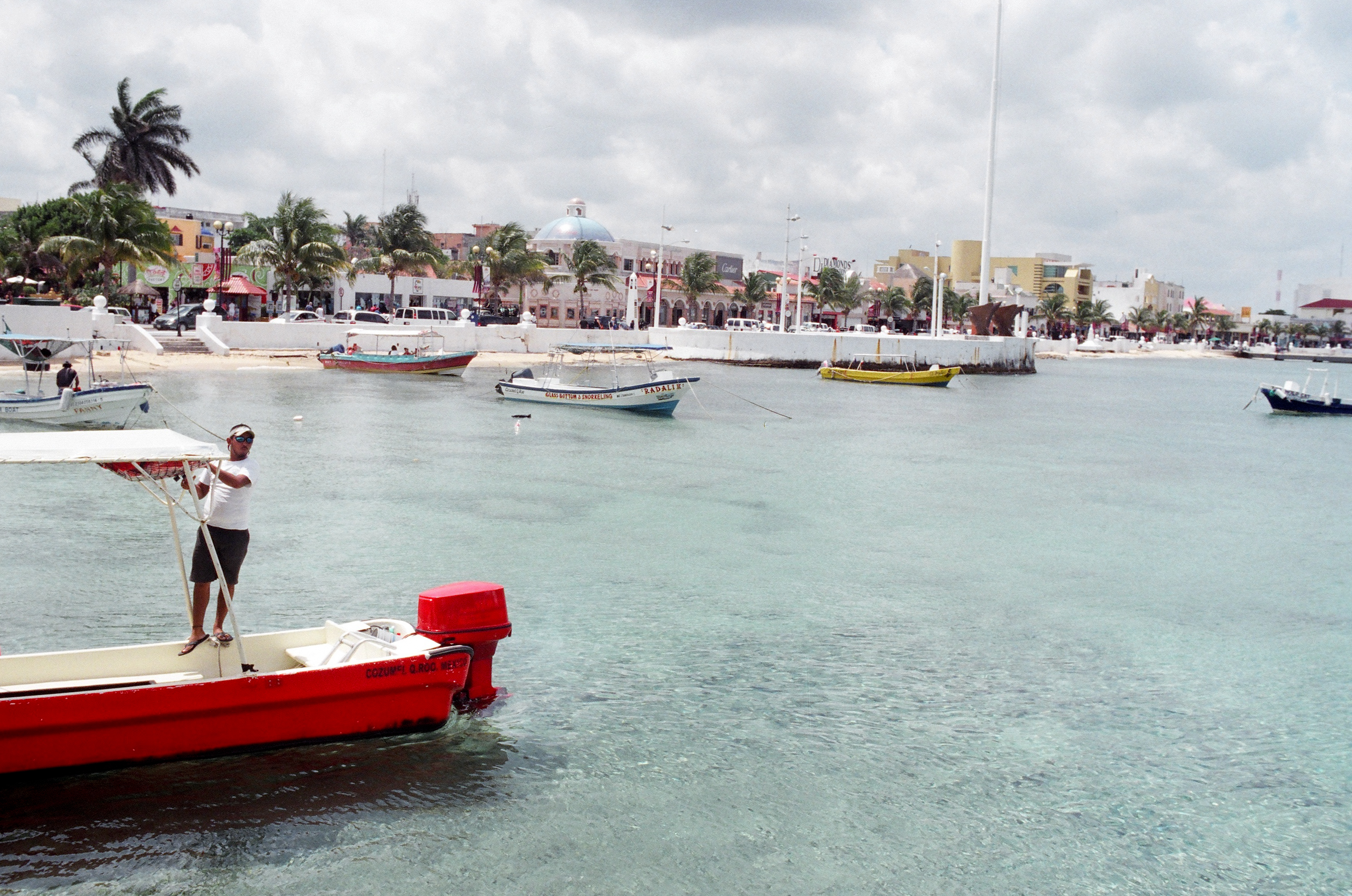
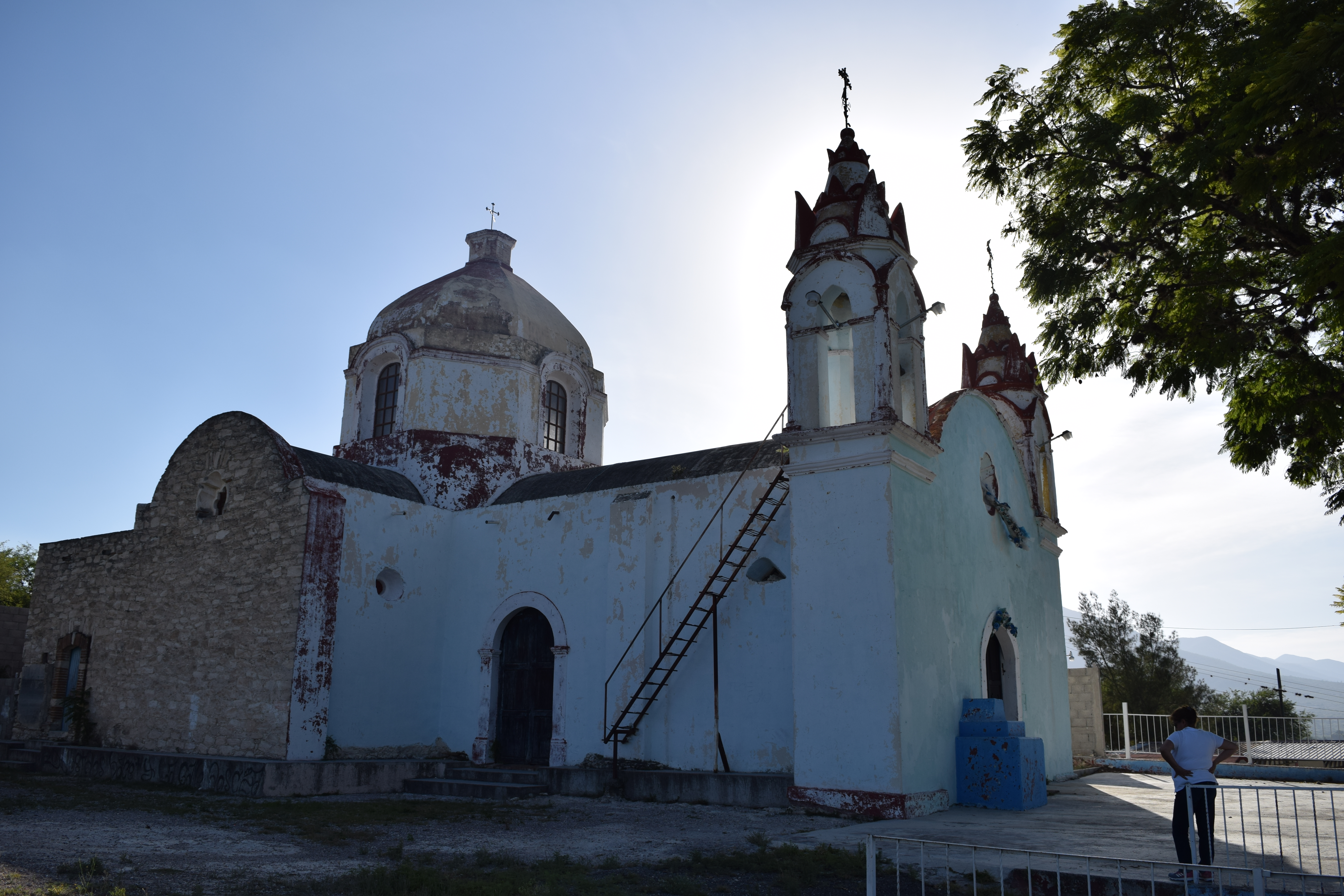
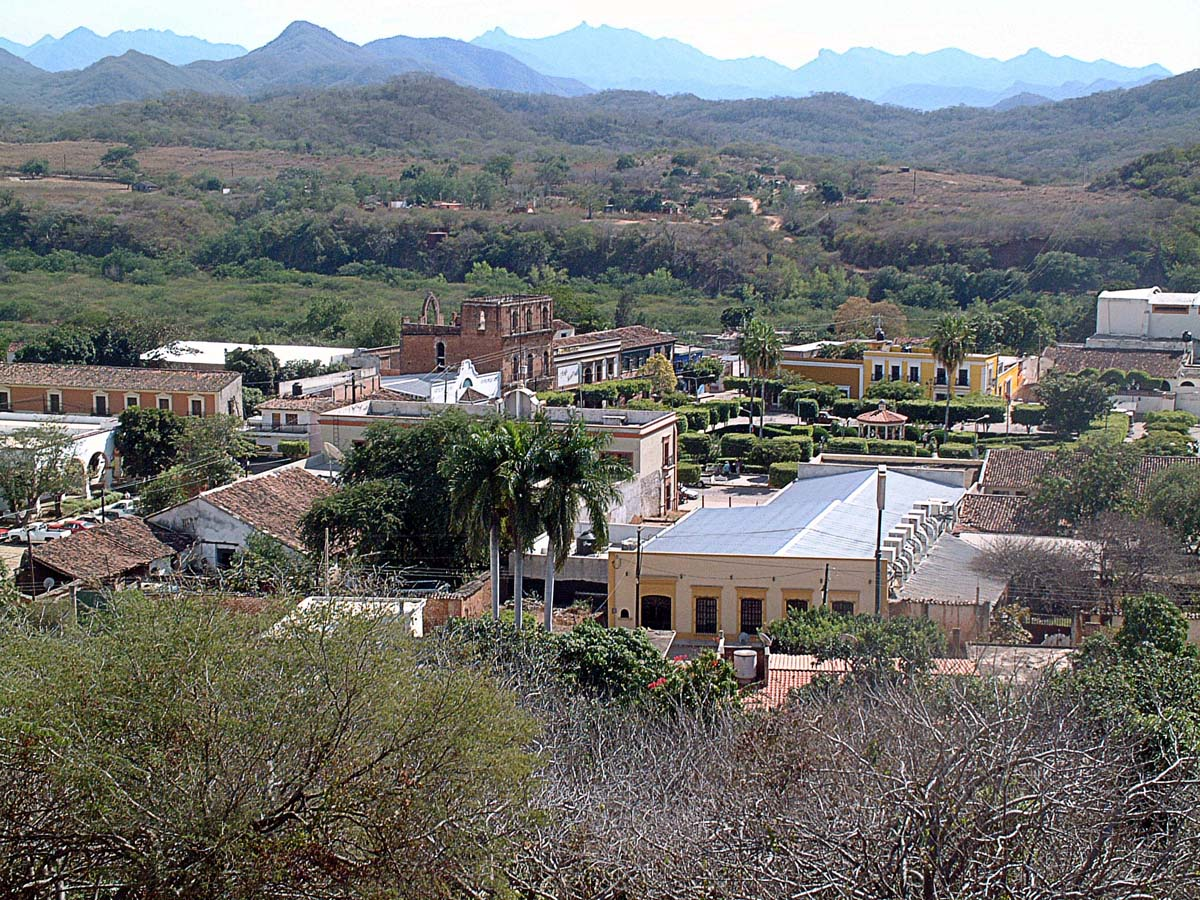
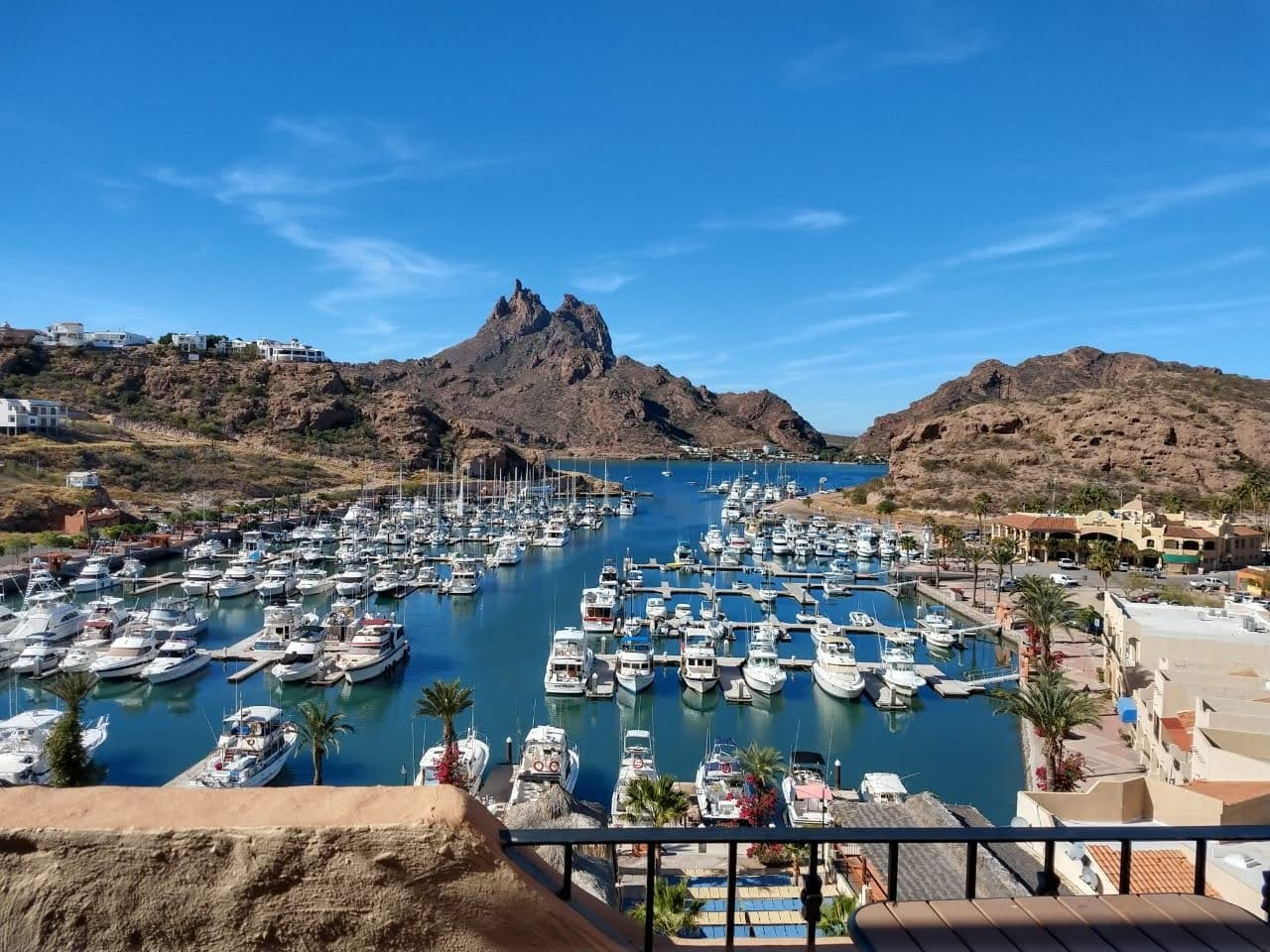
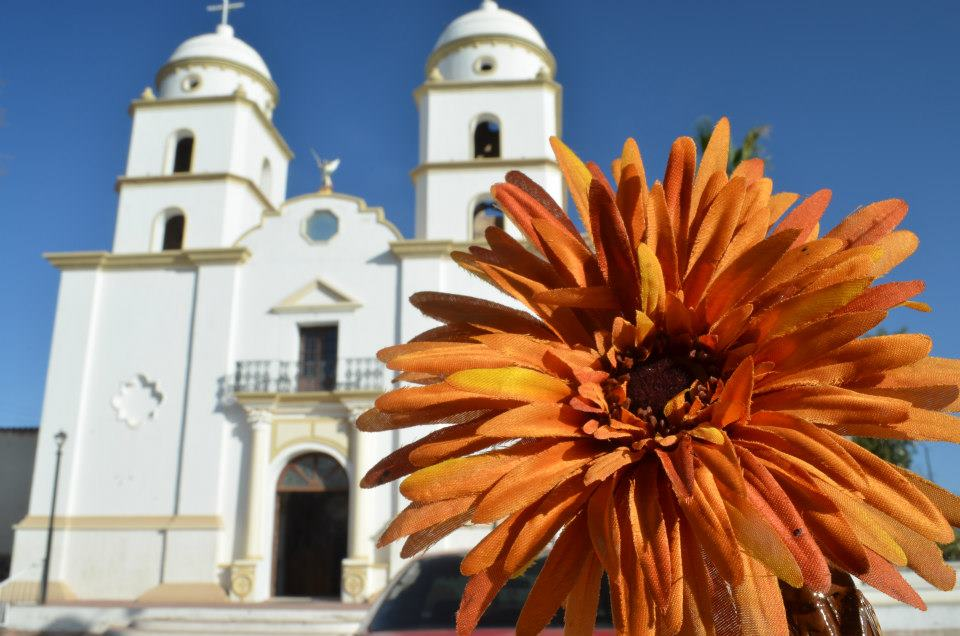
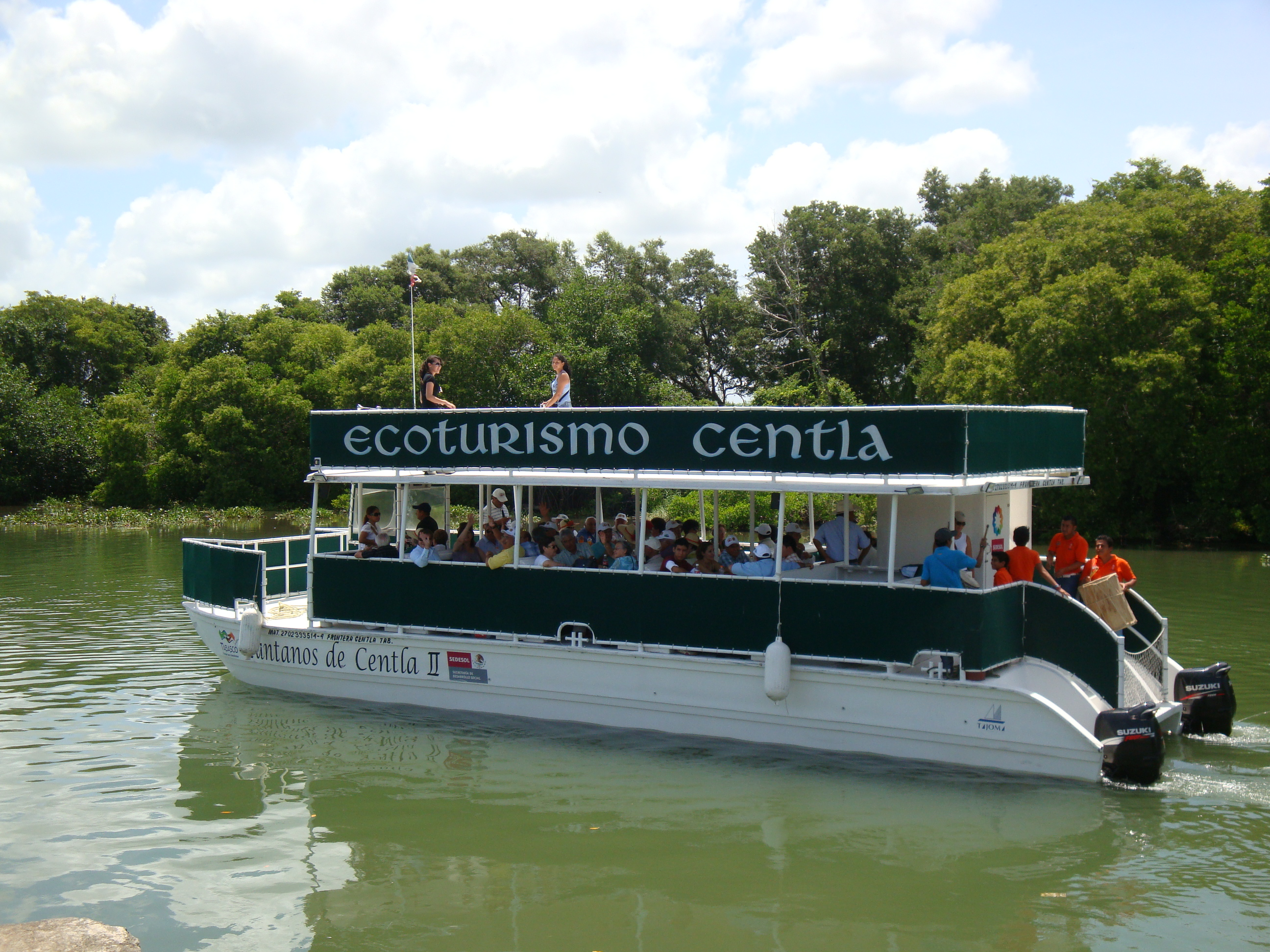
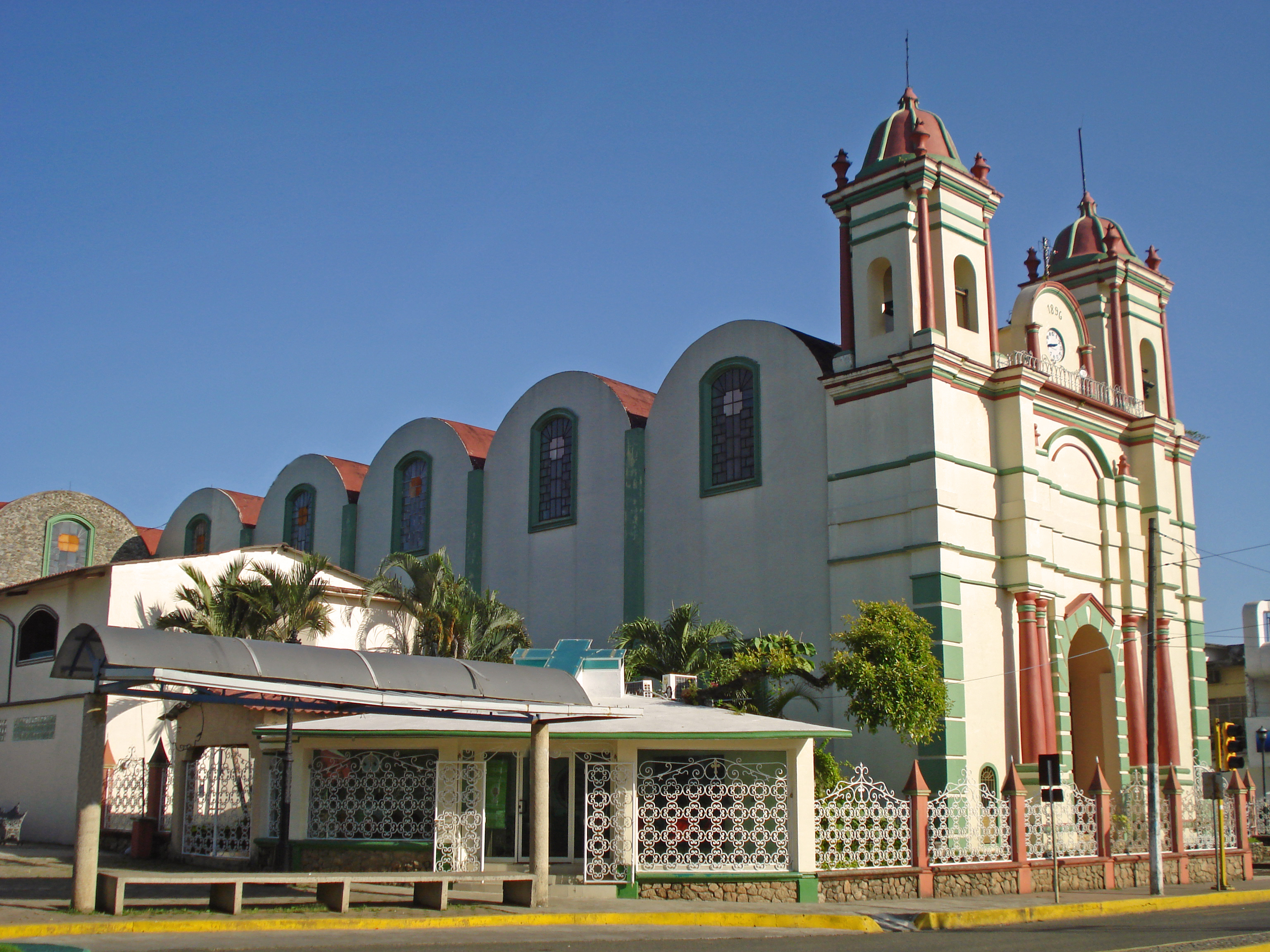
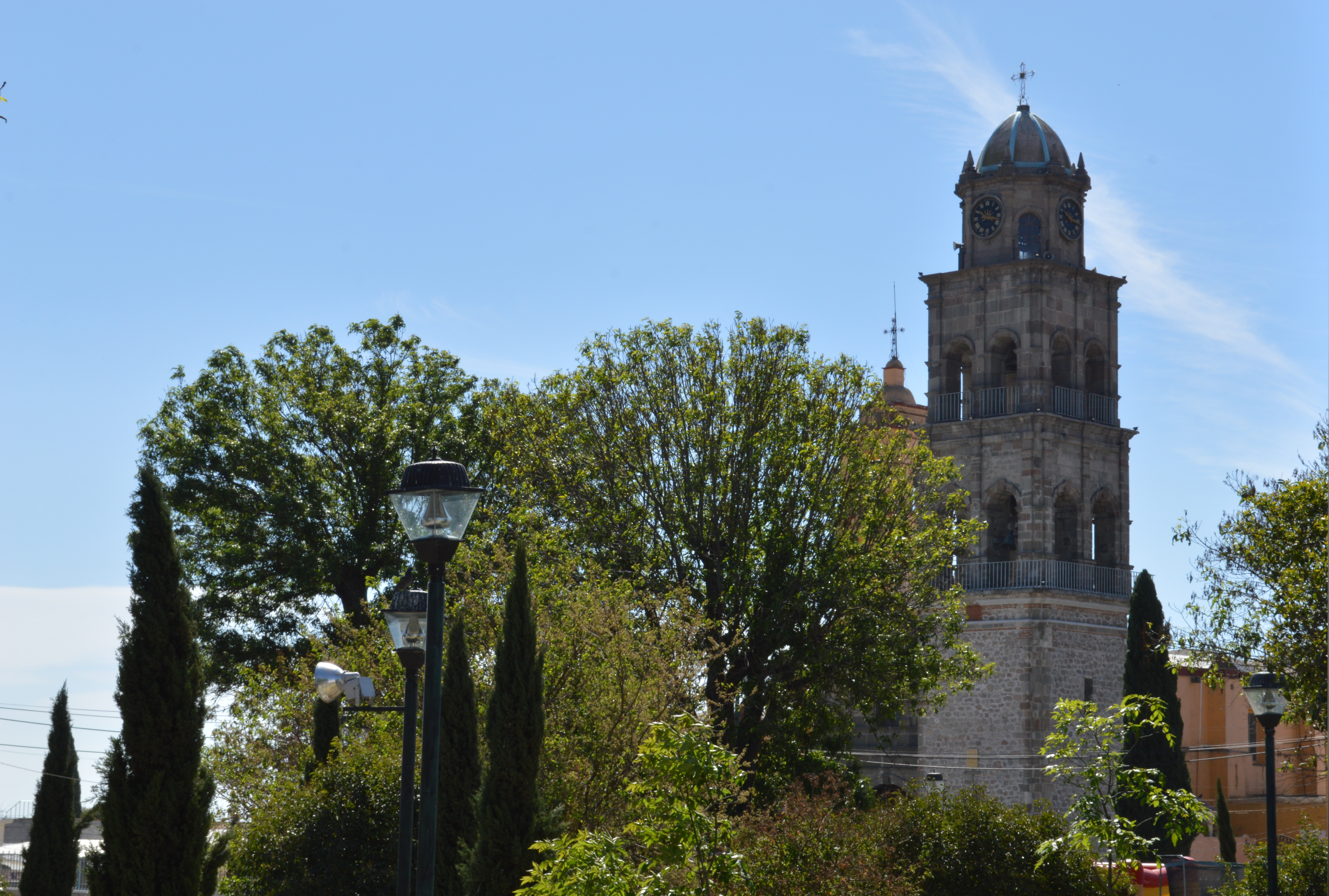
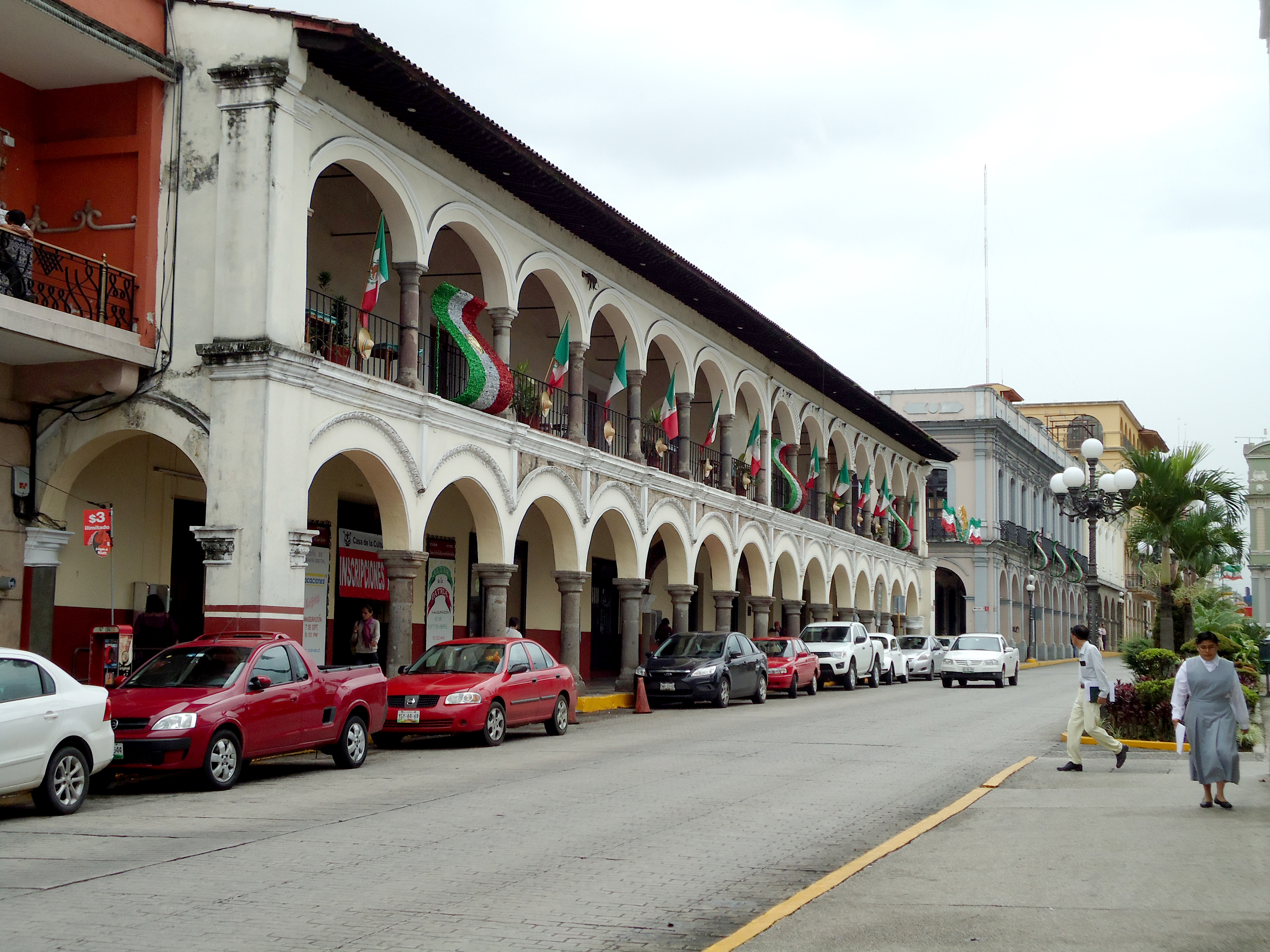
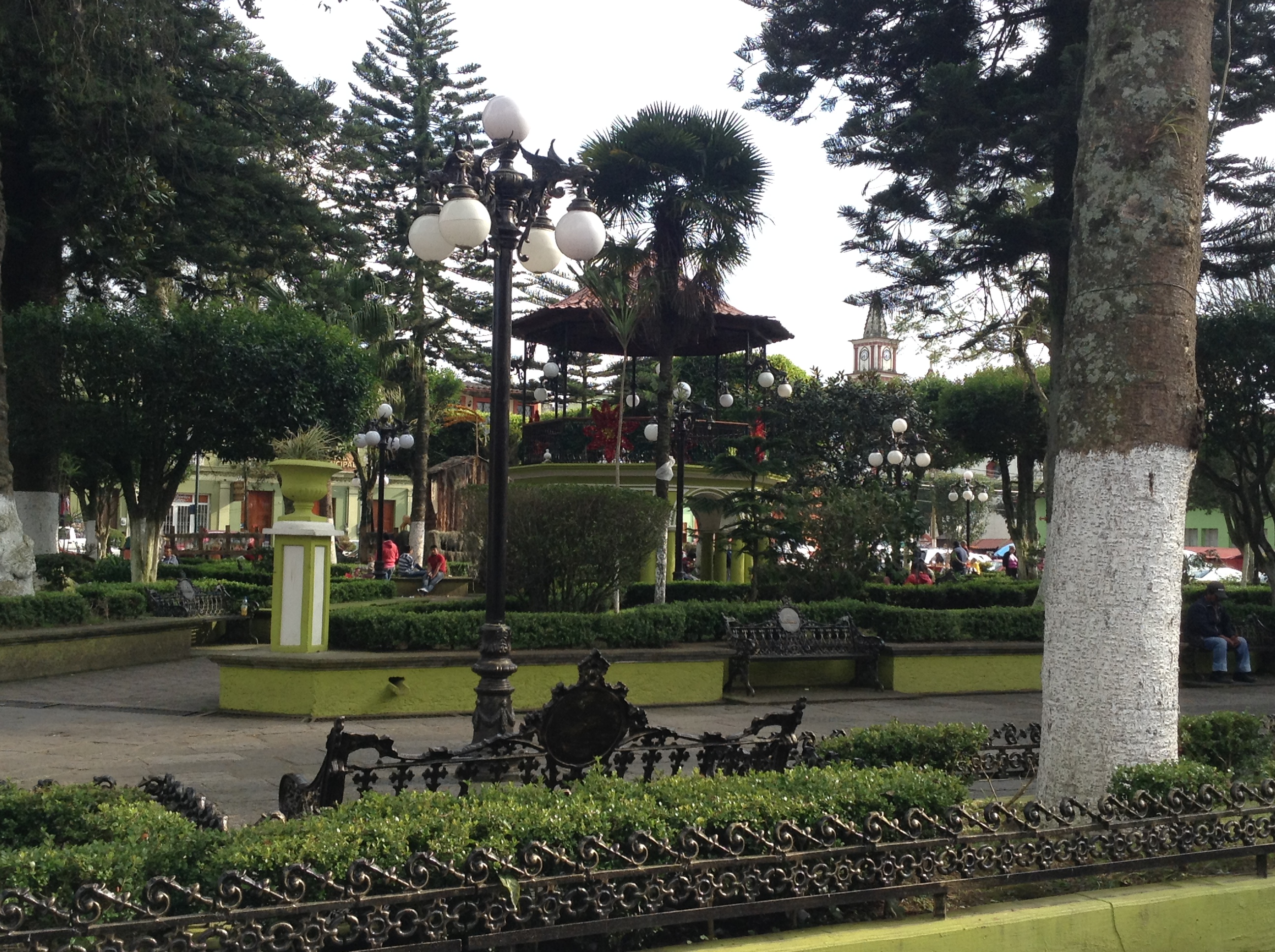
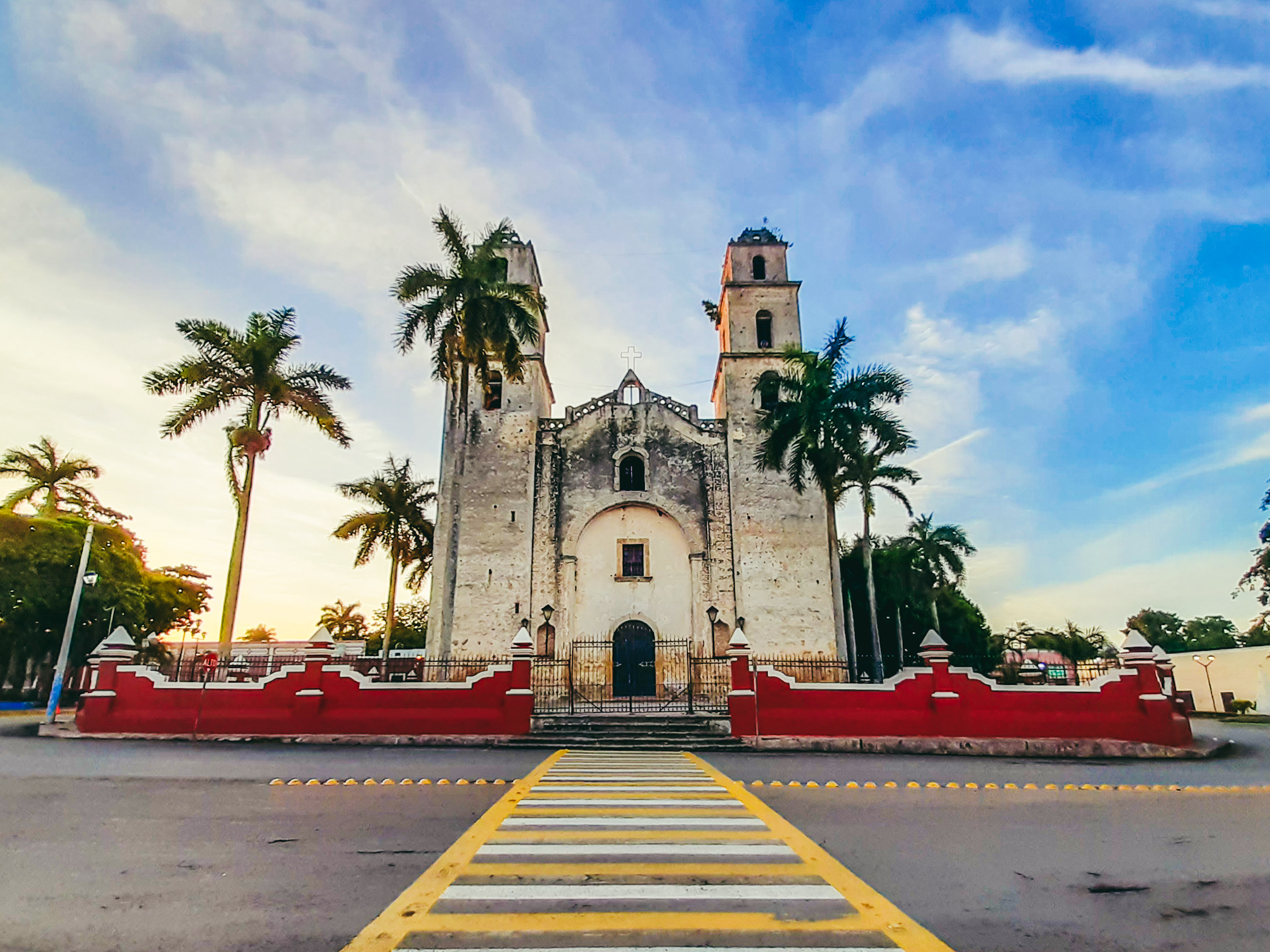
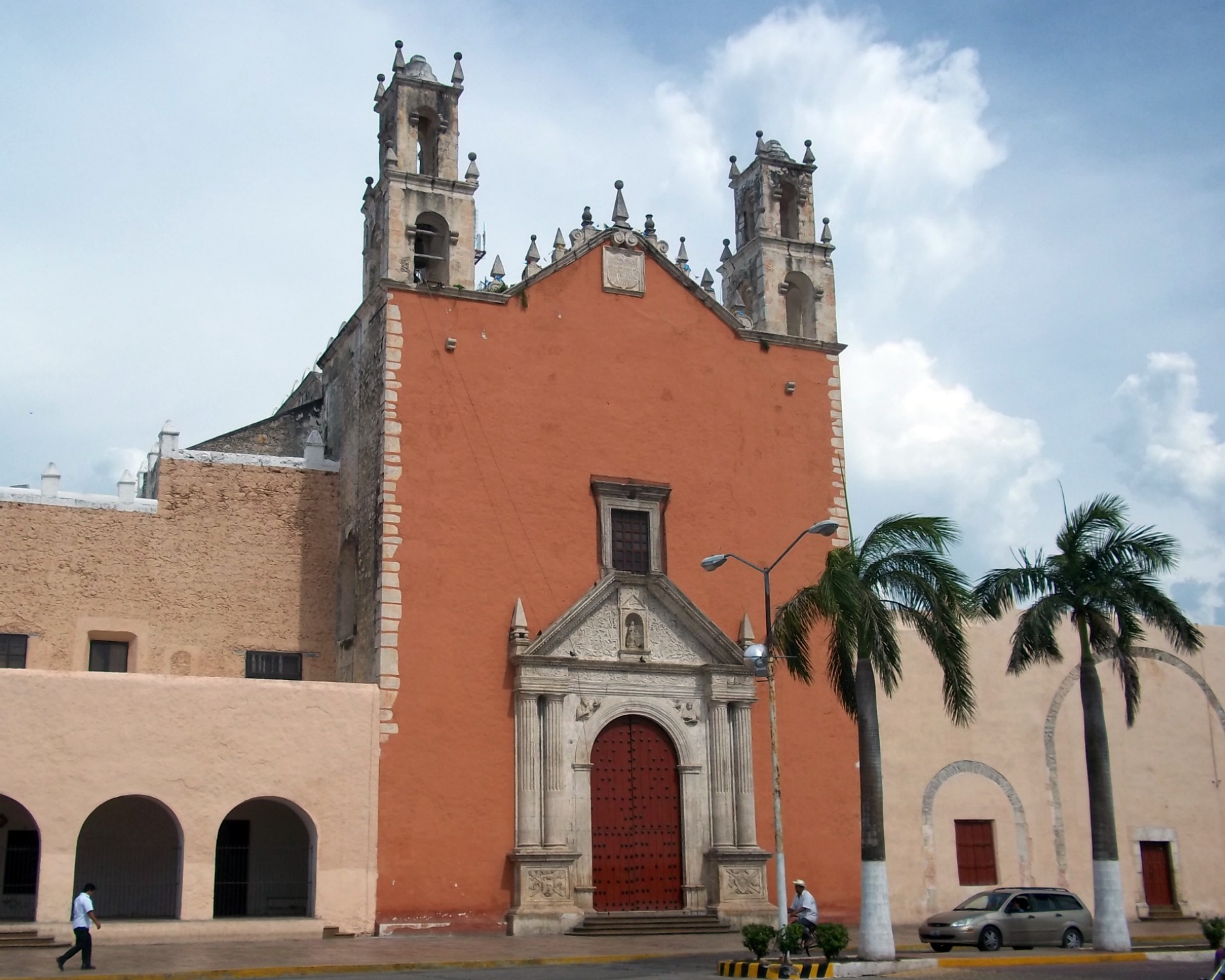
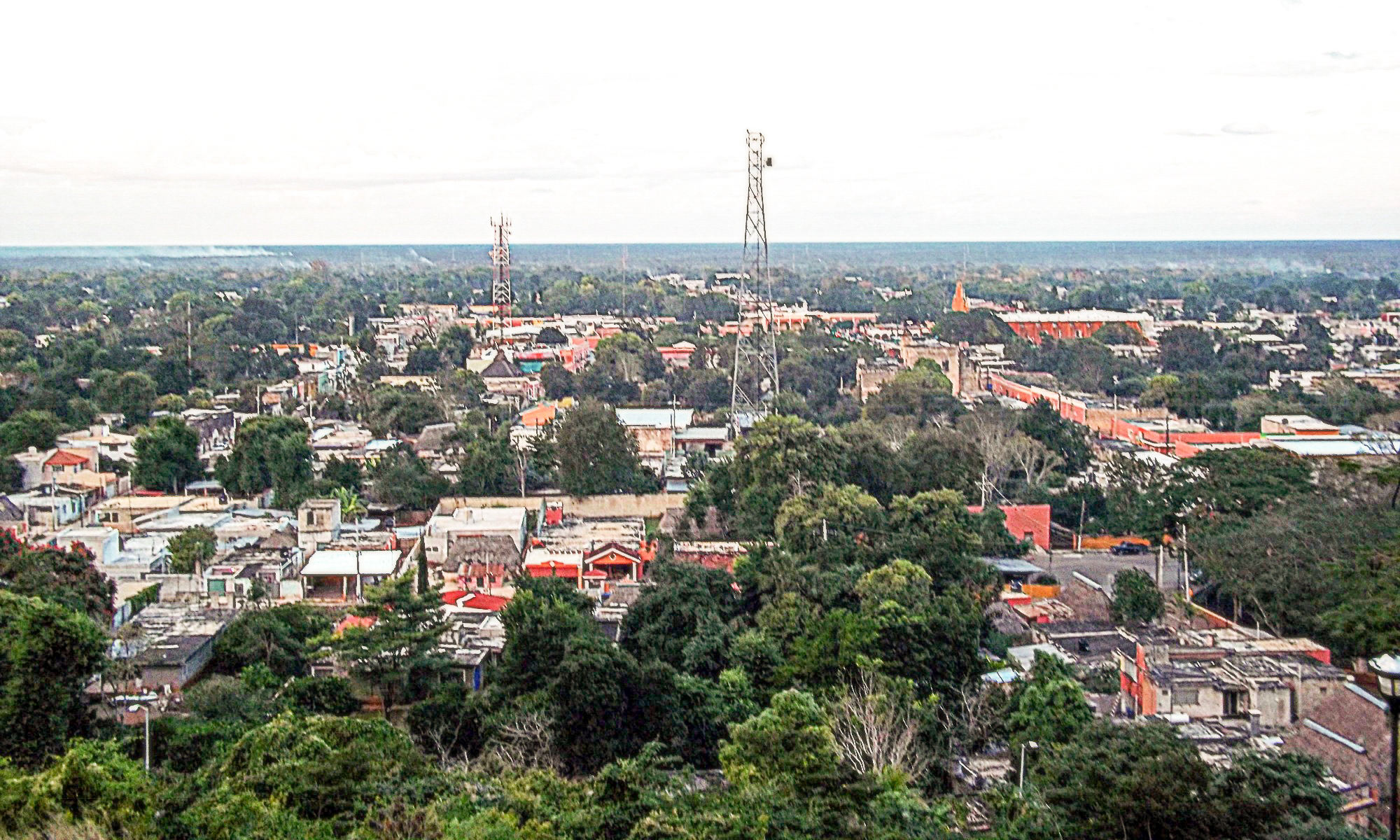
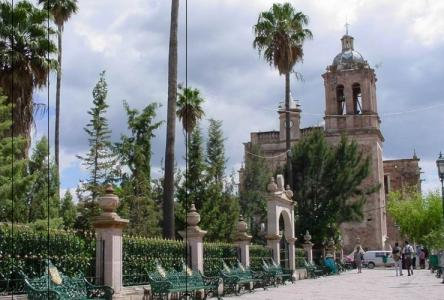
#	Image	Town	State	Registration Year
1		Huasca de Ocampo	Hidalgo	2001
2		Real de Catorce	San Luis Potosí	2001
3		Tepoztlán	Morelos	Declared in 2001, status revoked in 2009, but restored in 2010
4		Mexcaltitán de Uribe	Nayarit	Declared in 2001, status revoked in 2009, but restored in 2020
5		Taxco	Guerrero	2002
6		Tepotzotlán	México	2002
7		Tapalpa	Jalisco	2002
8		Comala	Colima	2002
9		Pátzcuaro	Michoacán	2002
10		Dolores Hidalgo	Guanajuato	2002
11		Cuetzalan	Puebla	2002
12		Izamal	Yucatán	2002
13		Tequila	Jalisco	2003
14		San Cristóbal de las Casas	Chiapas	2003
15		Real del Monte	Hidalgo	2004
16		Parras de la Fuente	Coahuila	2004
17		Valle de Bravo	México	2005
18		Mazamitla	Jalisco	2005
19		Álamos	Sonora	2005
20		Tlalpujahua	Michoacán	2005
21		Cosalá	Sinaloa	2005
22		Bernal	Querétaro	2005
23		Coatepec	Veracruz	2006
24		Real de Asientos	Aguascalientes	2006
25		Cuitzeo	Michoacán	2006
26		Santiago	Nuevo León	2006
27		Todos Santos	Baja California Sur	2006
28		Bacalar	Quintana Roo	2006
29		Jerez de García Salinas	Zacatecas	2007
30		Huamantla	Tlaxcala	2007
31		Creel	Chihuahua	2007
32		Capulálpam de Méndez	Oaxaca	2007
33		Ciudad Mier	Tamaulipas	2007
34		El Fuerte	Sinaloa	2009
35		Santa Clara del Cobre	Michoacán	2010
36		Tapijulapa	Tabasco	2010
37		Palizada	Campeche	2010
38		Jalpan de Serra	Querétaro	2010
39		Malinalco	México	2010
40		Zacatlán	Puebla	2011
41		Teúl de González Ortega	Zacatecas	2011
42		Tlayacapan	Morelos	2011
43		Mineral del Chico	Hidalgo	2011
44		Cadereyta de Montes	Querétaro	2011
45		Tula	Tamaulipas	2011
46		El Oro de Hidalgo	México	2011
47		Xico	Veracruz	2011
48		San Sebastián del Oeste	Jalisco	2011
49		Xilitla	San Luis Potosí	2011
50		Mineral de Pozos	Guanajuato	2012
51		Sombrerete	Zacatecas	2012
52		Angangueo	Michoacán	2012
53		Cuatrociénegas de Carranza	Coahuila	2012
54		Magdalena de Kino	Sonora	2012
55		Pahuatlán	Puebla	2012
56		Loreto	Baja California Sur	2012
57		Valladolid	Yucatán	2012
58		Metepec	México	2012
59		Chiapa de Corzo	Chiapas	2012
60		Comitán	Chiapas	2012
61		Huichapan	Hidalgo	2012
62		Tequisquiapan	Querétaro	2012
63		Batopilas	Chihuahua	2012
64		Chignahuapan	Puebla	2012
65		Cholula (San Pedro y San Andrés)	Puebla	2012
66		Pinos	Zacatecas	2012
67		Lagos de Moreno	Jalisco	2012
68		Tacámbaro	Michoacán	2012
69		Calvillo	Aguascalientes	2012
70		Nochistlán	Zacatecas	2012
71		Jiquilpan	Michoacán	2012
72		Tlatlauquitepec	Puebla	2012
73		Tzintzuntzan	Michoacán	2012
74		Mapimí	Durango	2012
75		Papantla	Veracruz	2012
76		Tecate	Baja California	2012
77		Arteaga	Coahuila	2012
78		Viesca	Coahuila	2012
79		Jalpa de Cánovas	Guanajuato	2012
80		Salvatierra	Guanajuato	2012
81		Yuriria	Guanajuato	2012
82		Xicotepec	Puebla	2012
83		Jala	Nayarit	2012
84		El Rosario	Sinaloa	2012
85		Aculco De Espinoza	México	2015
86		Atlixco	Puebla	2015
87		Candela	Coahuila	2015
88		Casas Grandes	Chihuahua	2015
89		Coscomatepec de Bravo	Veracruz	2015
90		Guerrero	Coahuila	2015
91		Huauchinango	Puebla	2015
92		Huautla de Jiménez	Oaxaca	2015
93		Isla Mujeres	Quintana Roo	2015
94		Ixtapan de la Sal	México	2015
95		Linares	Nuevo León	2015
96		Mascota	Jalisco	2015
97		Mazunte	Oaxaca	2015
98		Mocorito	Sinaloa	2015
99		Orizaba	Veracruz	2015
100		Palenque	Chiapas	2015
101		San Joaquín	Querétaro	2015
102		San José de Gracia	Aguascalientes	2015
103		San Pablo Villa de Mitla	Oaxaca	2015
104		San Pedro y San Pablo Teposcolula	Oaxaca	2015
105		Sayulita	Nayarit	2015
106		Talpa de Allende	Jalisco	2015
107		Tecozautla	Hidalgo	2015
108		Teotihuacán	México	2015
109		Tlaxco	Tlaxcala	2015
110		Tulum	Quintana Roo	2015
111		Villa del Carbón	México	2015
112		Zozocolco de Hidalgo	Veracruz	2015
113		Nombre de Dios	Durango	2018
114		Melchor Múzquiz	Coahuila	2018
115		Comonfort	Guanajuato	2018
116		Zimapán	Hidalgo	2018
117		Tlaquepaque	Jalisco	2018
118		Compostela	Nayarit	2018
119		Amealco de Bonfil	Querétaro	2018
120		Aquismón	San Luis Potosí	2018
121		Bustamante	Nuevo León	2018
122		Guadalupe	Zacatecas	2018
123		Isla Aguada	Campeche	2020
124		Zempoala	Hidalgo	2020
125		Ajijic	Jalisco	2020
126		Tonatico	México	2020
127		Paracho	Michoacán	2020
128		Santa Catarina Juquila	Oaxaca	2020
129		Tetela de Ocampo	Puebla	2020
130		Santa María del Río	San Luis Potosí	2020
131		Maní	Yucatán	2020
132		Sisal	Yucatán	2020
133		Pabellón de Hidalgo	Aguascalientes	2023
134		Santa Rosalía	Baja California Sur	2023
135		Candelaria	Campeche	2023
136		Copainalá	Chiapas	2023
137		Ocozocoautla de Espinosa	Chiapas	2023
138		Guachochi	Chihuahua	2023
139		Hidalgo del Parral	Chihuahua	2023
140		General Cepeda	Coahuila	2023
141		Ixcateopan de Cuauhtémoc	Guerrero	2023
142		Zihuatanejo	Guerrero	2023
143		Acaxochitlán	Hidalgo	2023
144		Metztitlán	Hidalgo	2023
145		Cocula	Jalisco	2023
146		Sayula	Jalisco	2023
147		Temacapulín	Jalisco	2023
148		Jilotepec	México	2023
149		Otumba	México	2023
150		Cotija	Michoacán	2023
151		Tlaltizapán de Zapata	Morelos	2023
152		Xochitepec	Morelos	2023
153		Ahuacatlán	Nayarit	2023
154		Amatlán de Cañas	Nayarit	2023
155		Ixtlán del Río	Nayarit	2023
156		Puerto Balleto	Nayarit	2023
157		San Blas	Nayarit	2023
158		General Terán	Nuevo León	2023
159		General Zaragoza	Nuevo León	2023
160		Huejotzingo	Puebla	2023
161		Teziutlán	Puebla	2023
162		Pinal de Amoles	Querétaro	2023
163		Cozumel	Quintana Roo	2023
164		Ciudad del Maíz	San Luis Potosí	2023
165		Tierra Nueva	San Luis Potosí	2023
166		San Ignacio	Sinaloa	2023
167		San Carlos	Sonora	2023
168		Ures	Sonora	2023
169		Frontera	Tabasco	2023
170		Teapa	Tabasco	2023
171		Ixtenco	Tlaxcala	2023
172		Córdoba	Veracruz	2023
173		Naolinco de Victoria	Veracruz	2023
174		Espita	Yucatán	2023
175		Motul	Yucatán	2023
176		Tekax	Yucatán	2023
177		Villanueva	Zacatecas	2023

== Towns removed from the program ==
Below is the list of sites that were enrolled in the program, but had their titles revoked for failure to meet standards during the re-evaluation or audit. One of them received enhanced recognition as a UNESCO World Heritage Site; the other two were subsequently brought into compliance and reinstated as Pueblos Mágicos.

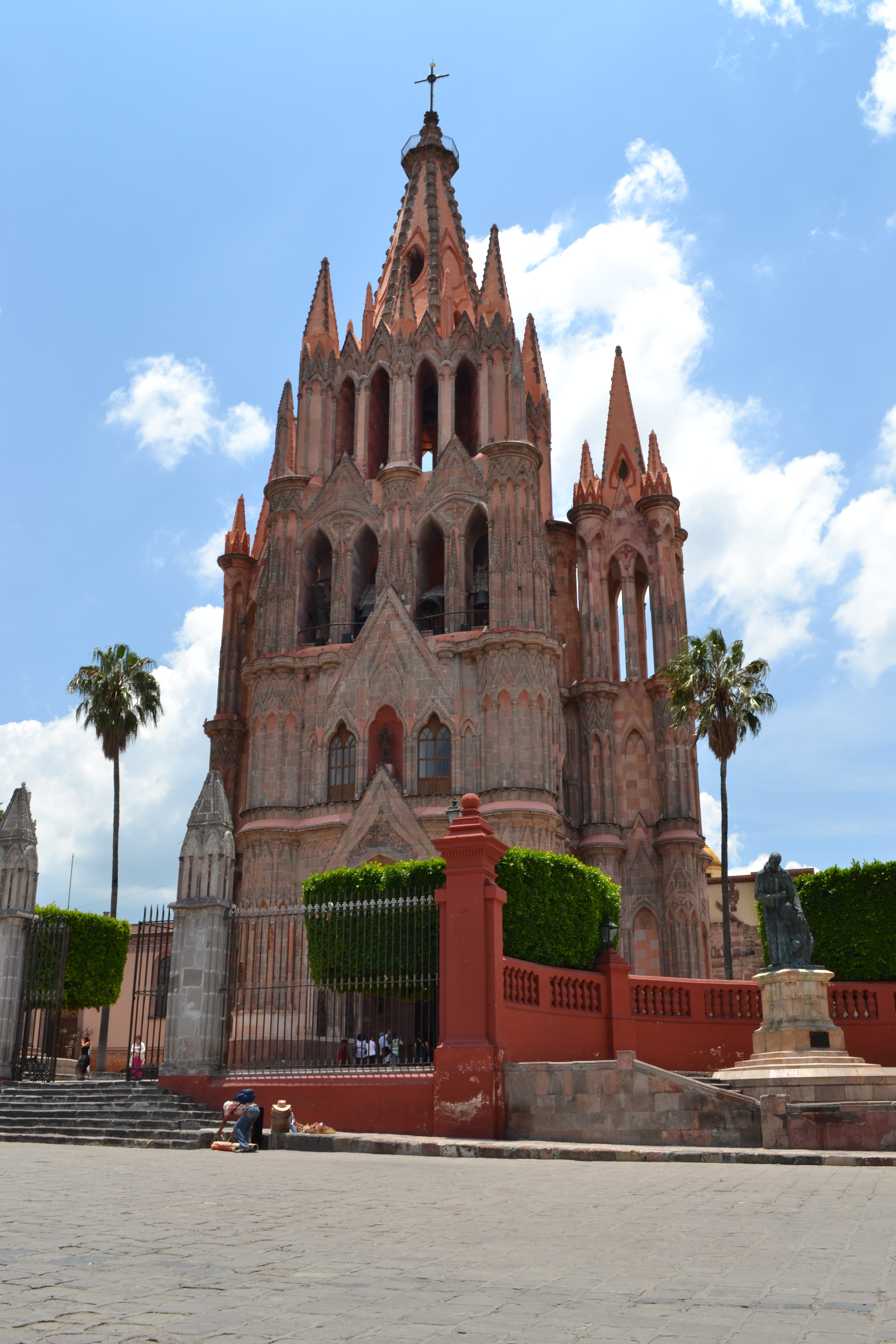
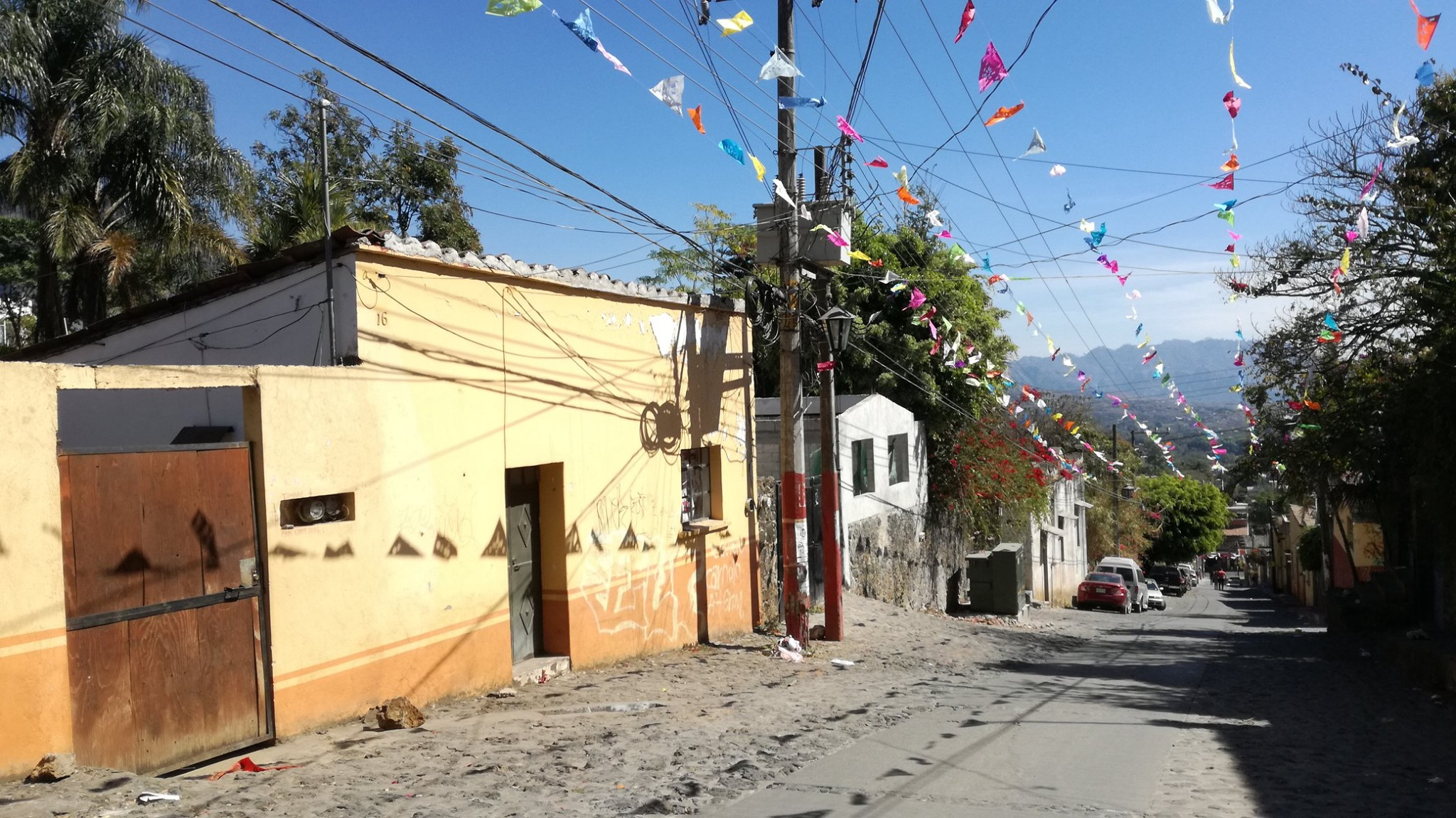
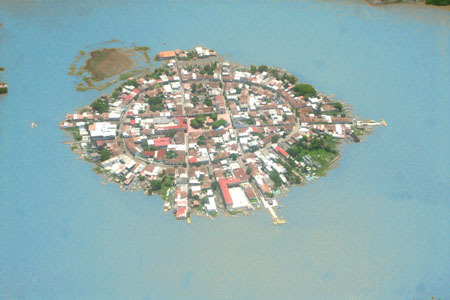
#	Image	Town	State	Registration Year	Retirement Year
1		San Miguel de Allende	Guanajuato	2002	In 2008 its status on the list was removed due to its inclusion as a UNESCO World Heritage Site.
2		Tepoztlán	Morelos	2001	Status removed in 2009; reinstated in 2010.
3		Mexcaltitlán	Nayarit	2001	Status removed in 2009; reinstated in 2020.

== Other ==
Some governments have tried to eliminate the program for political reasons but because this model is a citizen-based program focusing on empowering communities, these efforts have been unsuccessful. According to statistics from INEGI, the Pueblo Mágico program has provided great economic value, and created jobs for its participating communities. The program has been recognised by several countries around the world, as a role model domestically and internationally.

== See also ==
- Barrios Mágicos of Mexico City
- Pueblo Patrimonio (Colombia)
- Pueblos Mágicos (Ecuador)
- Pueblos Pintorescos (Guatemala)
