= Teatro de la República =

Coordinates: 20°35′39.5″N 100°23′34″W

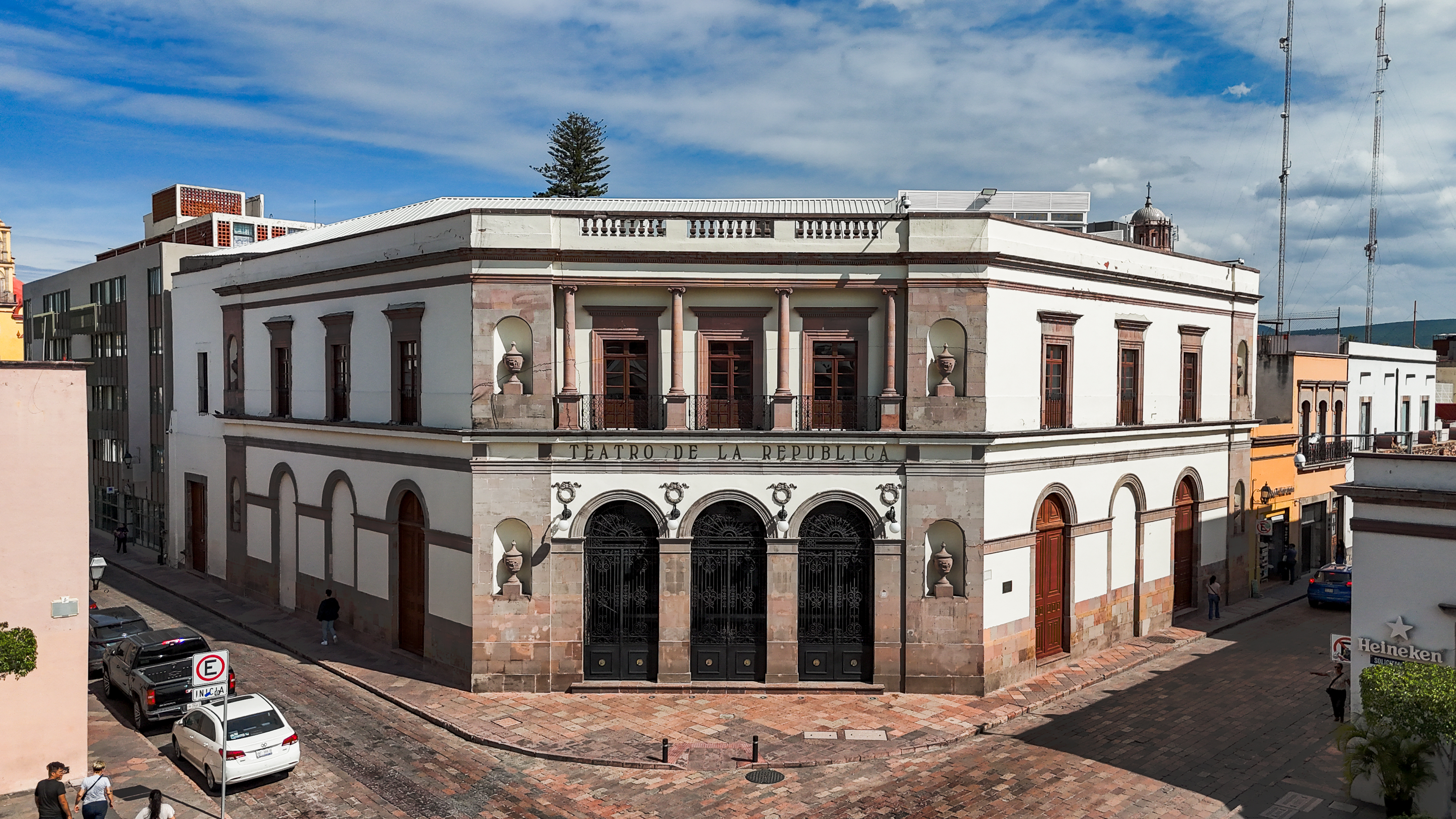
An image of Teatro de la República

Teatro de la República (literally, Theater of the Republic) originally Teatro Iturbide is a theater in the historic center of the city of Querétaro, México. It is built in a neoclassical style and the interior theater has 3 floors and 500 seats.

It is one of the most important historic buildings in the city because of the events which happened there. In 1867, the trial of Maximilian I of Mexico, which ended in his death sentence, was held in the theater. The theater hosted the drafting of the Mexican Constitution in 1917, for which the theater was renamed. The plan for Lázaro Cárdenas's 6-year term as President of Mexico was announced at the theater. Because of its historical importance, it was purchased by the Senate of the Republic in 2016 from the Josefa Vergara Foundation for Mex$100,000,000 in preparation for celebrations for the 100th anniversary of the Constitution.

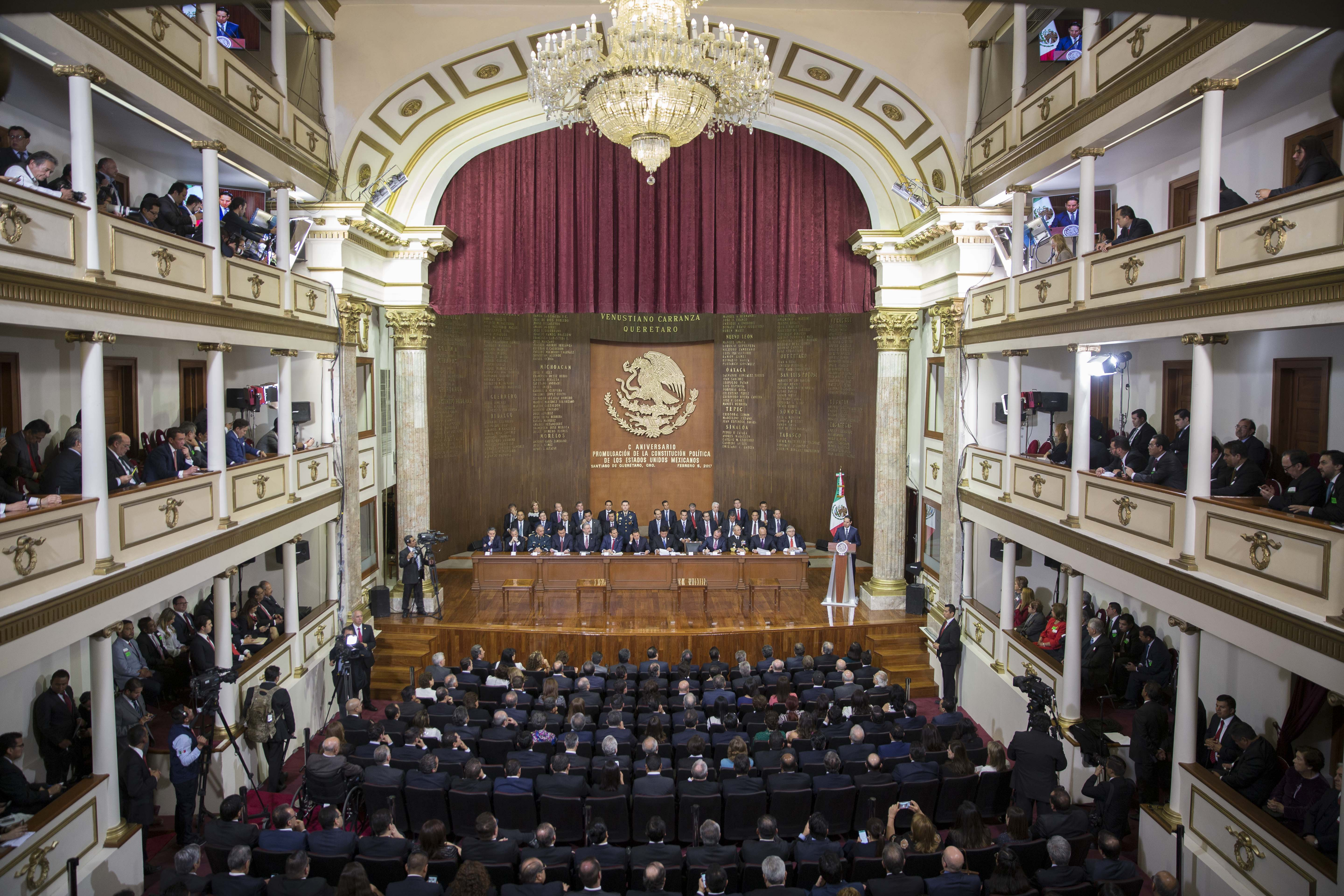
The 100th anniversary of the Constitution of Mexico

The theater was built between 1845 and 1852 under architect Camilo San Germán when Querétaro was still recovering from the Mexican War of Independence. Progress was halted during the Mexican–American War. In 1852 the governor of Querétaro state Ramón María Loreto dedicated it to Agustín de Iturbide, giving it the name Teatro Iturbide. In 1864, the building's ceiling was destroyed during the Siege of Querétaro by the Imperial forces inside the city for its lead content. Along with much of Querétaro, the theater was renovated in 1917 to accommodate delegates for the Constitution. Its name was finally changed in 1922 to the current one. The names of signatories of the Constitution are inscribed in gold letters on the wall at the back of the stage. Inside is a museum of the Constituent Congress of 1917.
