= El Teúl =

Archaeological site in Zacatecas, Mexico

- Interactive map of El Teúl
- Cultures: Chichimeca – Caxcan
- Location: Zacatecas, Mexico
- Region: Zacatecas

El Teúl is an important archaeological Mesoamerican site located on a hill with the same name in the municipality of Teúl in the south of the Mexican state of Zacatecas, near the border with the state of Jalisco.

This site had one of the first industrial zones of the continent; they manufactured copper and ceramics items, also found many archaeological materials of various kinds, such as: shell beads from shaft tombs, also earflaps with Teotihuacan motifs and polychrome ceramic Codex style. The objects found, were as a result of continuous occupation this site had, for at least one 1, 800 years, in contrast with other large cities like Teotihuacan and Monte Alban.

== History ==
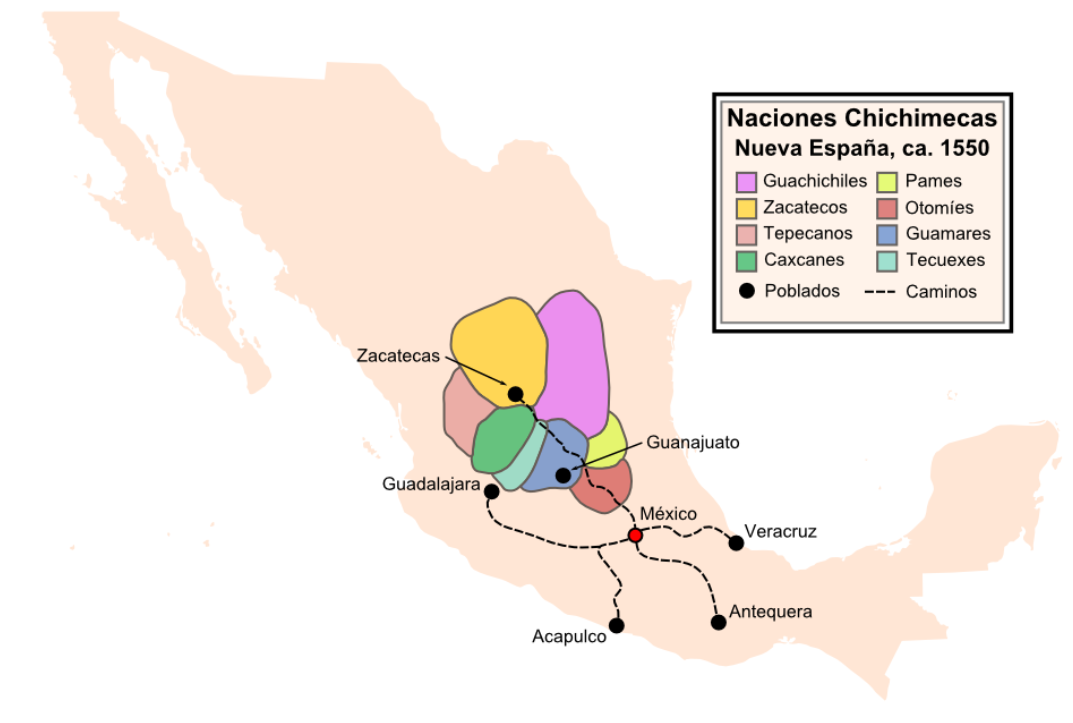
Cultural groups near Zacatecas

In the 16th century the area north of the central Mexico plateau, that was never conquered by the Aztecs, "La Gran Chichimeca". It now comprises the States of Jalisco, Aguascalientes, Nayarit, Guanajuato, San Luis Potosí Durango, Coahuila and Zacatecas. The Aztec and Spaniards called the residents of this great area, Chichimecas, although they were of different cultures, languages, or civilizations. It reported that four primary nations lived in what is now Zacatecas: the Caxcan, Guachichil, Tepehuán and Zacatecos. The state was named after the Zacatecos, it was the nickname given by the Aztecs to the Bufa hill inhabitants. Zacatec is a Nahuatl word composed from the roots zacatl 'reed or grass' and -co (locative suffix), and it means "inhabitants of the land where grass abounds."

The majority of its inhabitants were hunting nomads, but also settled in several places. Some parts of the territory, particularly the south was under Mesoamerican influence, while the rest of the territory formed part of what is now called Aridoamérica. Zacatecas has other important archaeological sites like La Quemada, located in the Villanueva municipality and Altavista in the Chalchihuites municipality. These areas have ceremonial buildings and pyramids with architectural features of the Mesoamerican cultures.

=== Chichimecs ===
Chichimeca was the name that the Nahua peoples of Mexico generically applied to a large number of bands and tribes of nomadic and semi-nomadic peoples who inhabited the north of modern-day Mexico and southwestern United States, and carried the same sense as the European term "barbarian". The name was adopted with a pejorative tone by the Spaniards when referring especially to the hunter-gatherer peoples of northern Mexico. In modern times only one ethnic group is customarily referred to as Chichimecs, namely the Chichimeca Jonaz, although lately this usage is being changed for simply "Jonáz" or their own name for themselves "Úza".

Many of the peoples called Chichimeca are virtually unknown today; few descriptions mention them and they seem to have been absorbed into mestizo culture or into other indigenous ethnic groups. For example, virtually nothing is known about the peoples referred to as Guachichiles, Caxcanes, Zacatecos, Tecuexes, or Guamares. Others like the Opata or "Eudeve" are well described but extinct as a people.

=== Caxcanes ===
The Caxcan (caxcanes or cazcanes in Spanish) were a partly nomadic people that spoke Uto-Aztecan languages. The Caxcan were allied with the Zacatecos against the Spaniards during the Mixtón Rebellion During the rebellion, they were described as "the heart and the center of the Indian Rebellion". They were famously led by Tenamaxtli. After the rebellion, they were at constant target by the Zacatecos and Guachichiles due to their ceasefire agreement with the Spaniards. Their principal religious and population centers were at Teul, Tlaltenango, Juchipila, and Teocaltiche.

Represented the largest group and lived around El Teúl, Tlaltenango, Juchipila, Teocaltiche, Nochistlán, Aguascalientes, and Jalisco. Within the group, a subgroup called "tezoles" believed they descended from the 7 Aztlán tribes, searching for the land promised by Huitzilopochtli; this is known from the miscellaneous Chronicle of Father Antonio Tello, who noted that the caxcans have some similarity in language of the Aztecs; refers to "caxcans peoples are people who speaks almost the Aztec language and claimed to be Aztec descendants, but do not speak the language as cultured and refined as the Aztec".

It is also believed that as a consequence of the Chalchihuites collapse, there was a migration to the south, and would eventually become the caxcanes. The word caxcan means "there is no", and the name remained because "when the spaniards arrived and asked for food or other things, the people responded in their native language, "I do not have or there is no...".

The caxcans were conquerors, through their history, conquered and founded towns as Amecatl, Tuitlán, Juchipila, El Teúl, Nochistlán and Teocaltiche, "a center of Tecuexe warriors who were allied with caxcan neighbors, the Zacatecas and guachichiles".

The caxcans had a political and social system structured, had a larger village as capital, and several smaller dependent neighborhoods. Unlike other Chichimeca groups, the caxcans became sedentary due to their relations with Otomí and Purépecha peoples.

== Regional trade ==
Nayarit ceramics evidence has been found, in the coastal Nayarit region have found copper artifacts.

Absence thus far of copper oxide minerals as well as Nayarit ceramic on this site, infer of trade relations, and the possibility that foundries here manufactured ornaments for Nayarit. This opens an interesting debate on the old economies and regional trade.

It is known that the El Teúl inhabitants had links with the Atemajac Valley, the tequila Valley and the Sayula basin. Also with La Quemada and Chalchihuites (Zacatecas) in addition to relations with Bolaños and the aztatlán network, a culture located in Nayarit and Sinaloa.

== Occupation periods ==
It is believed that the site is one of the few places on the continent with an uninterrupted occupation from 200 BCE to 1531 CE. The occupation chronology is comparable with cities such as Cholula.

It is possible that the site was a Caxcanes ceremonial center, one of the most warrior groups against the Spanish invaders and those who were about to defeat them in the famous Mixtón war.

El Teúl caxcan occupation is estimated at two centuries (1350 / 1400 to 1531 CE). The destruction of the ceremonial area, this particular stage, occurred when the caxcans reused it a place of worship.

In Zacatecas, El Teúl was occupied at least six centuries before other ceremonial centers, such as La Quemada and Altavista, and was contemporary during the mid-classical and epiclassical periods, from 400 to 1000 CE, to be then occupied again 500 years after the abandonment.

Fire evidence has been found during the epiclassical period (600-900 CE.) such as “box tombs”. These are dated between 200 and 500 CE, evidence of changes in funerary patterns from shaft tombs to box tombs.

This is important because represents the time when western cultures begin to integrate to the Bajío and the Valley of Mexico.

So far it is not known who the caxcanes were and what their pottery was like. In relation to the occupation of this site, it is not known who built it originally and who lived here before the caxcans.

El Teúl was inhabited during 1,800 years, three times more than sites such as La Quemada, and Alta Vista, also in Zacatecas, they only had six centuries of occupation.

== The site ==
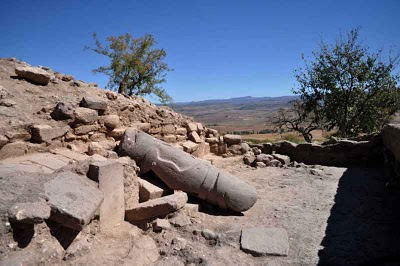
Archeological remains at the site

The site has a total area of 150 hectares; there is only exploration in an area of five to six hectares. The site is not yet open to the public.

Two pyramids and a portion of a ball game court have only been uncovered, several human burials were found, that reveal changes in funerary patterns of their former inhabitants.

Objects found reflect the life of the ancient inhabitants of the site, such as a fetus representation found in the pyramid at the altar.

Also found shell beads and green stone were found from shaft tombs, in addition to earflaps with Teotihuacan's motifs and polychrome ceramic style Codex, among others.

== Structures ==
Investigation and exploration work is ongoing, thus far several structures have been found:

=== Circular altar ===
A circular altar was found, measuring over six meters in diameter.

=== Eastern complex ===
This complex has the following reported structures:

- Ballgame court, only half of the court has been explored, has two construction stages. The first corresponds to the epiclassical, while the late stage reveals a new construction with a very fine masonry which makes it a closed court; it dates from the early postclassical (900 to 1100 CE).
- Two mound plaza (No information available)
- Sunken patio. Several human burials were found, of the “Box Tomb Tradition”.

== Sculpture ==
A prehispanic sculpture was found, representing a life-size decapitated ballgame player.

It is a stone sculpture dated between 900 and 1100 CE, there is evidence that it was intentionally manufactured without head, probably for the ball game rituals.

It is a cylindrical sculpture measuring 1.97 meters high, 52 centimeters in diameter, with an approximate weight of one ton, found on the south side, east of the ballgame court.

Also found fragments of another such sculpture at the other side, it is possible that there are other similar sculptures.

== Furnace ==
An almost intact copper smelting furnace was found, one of the metallurgy problems is how to fire furnaces; evidence found indicate that corn cobs were apparently used, used as fuel and wick.

The prehispanic furnace built over 800 years ago, was used for copper smelter.

Finding this furnace is of great importance, is the oldest in prehispanic Mexico and was used during the early postclassical, i.e. between 900 and 1200 CE.

The furnace was built with Stone and masonry, has ashes and corn traces and burnt corn, that was used as fuel, these organic materials will allow a more precise dating.

In some Michoacán Purépecha sites, have found structures resembling furnaces but very damaged, this is the first one complete, allowing analyzing aspects of technologies used, which was not known in Mexico.

== Tombs ==
Seven graves of the so-called "shaft tomb” were found, characteristic of western cultures, and correspond to the late preclassical (200 BCE to 200 CE) period.

These are deep burials.

At the sunken patio, several human burials were found, depicting the box burial tradition. These burials are characterized by the flexed position of the human remains and placed in masonry “boxes”, with their respective offerings.

These burials are dated from 200 to 500 CE, and reflect funeral changes of the ancient inhabitants, from shaft tomb patterns to box burials.

== See also ==
- La Quemada
- Altavista (Zacatecas)
- Caxcán
- Chichimecas
- Xólotl
- Teúl Municipality
- Zacatecas
