= El Cóporo =

Archeological site in Guanajato, Mexico

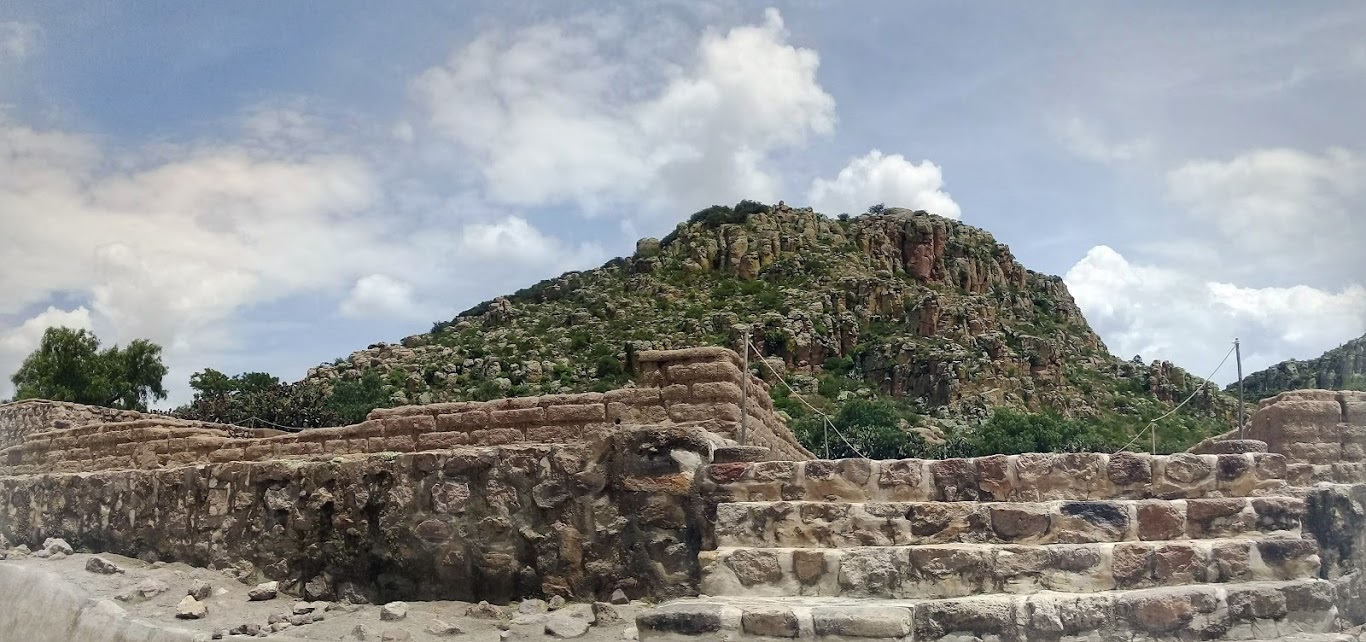
- Ruined structures in the El Cóporo archaeological zone
- Interactive map of El Cóporo
- Periods: Late Classic and Early Postclassic
- Cultures: Chichimeca - Guachichil - Toltec
- Location: Guanajuato, Mexico
- Region: Guanajuato

History
- Built: 200 AD
- Abandoned: 1000 AD

El Cóporo is a prehispanic archaeological site at the northern frontiers of the Mesoamerican cultural area, located at an elevation of 150 meters on the western slopes of the Santa Bárbara range (Sierra de Santa Bárbara), near the San José del Torreón community, and lies some 15 kilometres (9 mi) due south of its municipal seat and largest township, on the northwestern corner of Guanajuato state, Mexico.

The site is considered as one of the four most important archaeological sites in the state.

Cóporo is a Purépecha word meaning 'over the big road'. The site is named after the Cóporo hill, where it is located and the site is located at its peak, 156 meters high. The ceremonial and government center has been completed about 80 percent; around the center 29 smaller settlements were established on the slopes, the main occupation period occurred between 500-900 CE.

The site's main occupation dates to the Late Classic and Early Postclassic eras of Mesoamerican chronology, and shows affinities with the Tunal Grande culture.

El Cóporo covers an area of approximately 84 hectares (210 acres) spread across the slopes and summit of Cerro del Cóporo, the hill after which the site is named. As of 2009 an estimated five percent of this area has been archaeologically excavated or investigated.

The ethnic groups that lived in this region are associated with cultures that developed in the San Luís Potosí, Jalisco, Zacatecas and Guanajuato States, and that a point in time, migrated to central México, where they joined other groups and participated in the development of the multi-ethnic Toltec society.”

== Background ==
For a long time Guanajuato is considered a region inhabited since times prehispanic times, only by native hunter-gatherers of the Chichimeca with a semi nomadic culture way of life.

During the late postclassical the Chichimeca lived in the region, these lands were previously occupied by sedentary peoples integrated high Mesoamerican culture. Records of this civilization are scattered throughout the territory along the rivers, valleys, slopes and top of the hills. It is common for local historians to associate these vestiges of semi nomadic peoples, reinforcing old assumptions that Guanajuato was only inhabited by Chichimecas; it is evident that in Guanajuato inhabited from remote times, various ethnic groups that maintained complex forms of partnerships.

The prehispanic period extends from the origin of the first settlers on the continent. During this long time men who inhabited Ocampo forged a culture with own identity and characteristics. The municipality of Ocampo was seat of men who bequeathed cultures and ways of life that were conditioned by geographical elements as well as influence form the great Mesoamerican cultures, particularly Teotihuacan and Toltec. These cultural samples had common characteristics to the cultures established in the Highlands, but the desert conditions barely allowed the development of groups semi nomadic hunters-gatherers.

El Cóporo is recognized as a site with Chupícuaro cultural influences which flourished in the Bajío in parallel with the Teotihuacan culture.

It can be stated that the in Guanajuato State existed among other Nations; the Otomíes ("Chichimeca" ancestors) and Nahuatlacas.

=== The Chichimeca ===
It is estimated that they reached central Mexico in the 12th century CE, causing natural displacement of several groups, including the Otomies and Tecuexe.

It is commonly thought that the Chichimecas were uncultivated, simple nomadic people without organization, and occasionally made raids in the Otomi and Purépecha regions.

The Spanish invaders, after the conquest of Tenochtitlan, never imagined that it would take them more than two centuries to conquer northern Mexico, a region known as Aridoamerica. Several Chichimeca groups inhabited the regions. This name was given because of the thought that they had a lower cultural level, compared to other native cultures of Mesoamerica.

Four major Chichimeca Nations were Pames, Guamare, Zacateco and Guachichiles, these last two unlike the Tecuexe, Caxcans and the other two groups had a lower cultural level, because others had altars and knew agriculture.

However, the chichimecas managed to build temples-fortress, ballgame courts, developed pottery, painting (petroglyphs), etc. all this in harsh conditions, in an arid area where rainfall is scarce and the climate is variable. In this region the predominant Chichimeca nation were the Guachichiles, the most warrior group. Their operations center was “Tunal el Grande”, served as refuge shelter and food source. The Guachichiles were known to paint their bodies, hair, and faces in red dye. For this reason they were called "guachichile" by the Mexica, meaning "heads painted red".

=== Religion ===
Religion was practiced in civic-religious centers, performed by priests, witches or sorcerers who were called “madai cojoo”, which means big sorcerer; usually these ceremonial centers or worship places (cues), were on the slopes of mountains or high places. Apart from the Sun and the Moon, had no fixed gods, these could be stone one day and the next a different figure or symbol.

=== The Chichimeca Name ===
According to the Chichimeca Wikipedia entry, Chīchīmēcah is Nahuatl for inhabitants of the area of milk, sometimes incorrectly associated with the word dog, which has a different spelling in Nahuatl.

Chichimeca was the name that the Nahua peoples of Mexico generically applied to a wide range of semi-nomadic peoples who inhabited the north of modern-day Mexico and southwestern United States, and carried the same sense as the European term "barbarian".

The term has other potential interpretations: for example, Alva Ixtlilxóchitl mentions that in their language it meant Eagles, for others it means sucking, the chichi verb mean to breastfeed, and according to Torquemada this name were given because they sucked blood from animals which they hunted. As well as these, there are other meanings; chichic (bitter), chichi (dog), etc.; others propose that chichimeca means people who live in chichiman and chichiman is understood as a place of dogs.

=== The silver route ===
Roads have personality, because of the sites and conditions found in its path, as well as by destinations and their functions.

As it is known, there were trade routes across the Mesoamerican region, and is also known that there were mines with minerals and semi-precious stones, with a trade area which probably began in the United States South, passed through the center of Mexico and reached venues as remote as Nicaragua and Costa Rica in Central America. It is very possible that these routes passed through this site.

== Investigations ==
This archaeological area includes several areas that suggest, based on archaeological evidence (ceramic objects and stone tools), an affinity with the Tunal Grande region (San Luis Potosí) and strong links with prehispanic settlements in Zacatecas, Jalisco and the Guanajuato Bajio.

Beatriz Braniff made the first archaeological research in 1962. Establish the first ceramic sequence, knowledge of some architectural elements (the presence of columns that linked it with sites like La Quemada and Altavista (Zacatecas)) as well as an occupation that started in the Preclassical and ended in the early Postclassical.

In 1965, Mr. Jesús Aguirre, local researcher, conducted other research, found several pieces that from its quality, artistic and religious implications, inferred a high level of social development on the site during its occupation.

In 2002, after nearly 40 years, archeological explorations in the site are restarted. Armando Nicolau Romero, continued archaeological research of the site, made topographical surveys and excavations.

== The site ==
This prehispanic settlement was formed by a number of villages around the Hill. It is estimated that early settlement stages possibly took place towards 200 CE. According to evidence found, estimated that the city was abandoned between 1000 and 1100 CE, possibly due to climate change in the region that prevented further agricultural activities.

Researchers have identified three archaeological spaces, called neighborhoods: area considered ceremonial; in the bottom The Gotas and Montes neighborhoods, with platforms, and along the Valley housing units.

Within the site distinct assemblages (conjuntos) and structural complexes have been identified, grouped into zones indicating a functional differentiation between ceremonial, civic administration, residential and other spaces. Archaeologists have identified over 150 structures distributed across these groups.

== Conjuntos ==
Four pyramid structures, possibly an exclusive area for rulers and priests have been identified at the top of the Hill. These architectural groups are called Gotas, Montés, Cóporo, Caracol, were built at the end of the classical and epiclassical period, between 500 and 900 CE. A number of large squares whose functions could have been administrative and religious have also been identified on the north and west slopes of the complex.

So far six groups (conjuntos) of this prehispanic site, related to the Tunal Grande culture (200-1100 CE) have been excavated: Gotas, Llano, Aire, Cóporo, Montés and Caracol.

=== Cóporo ===
Conjunto Cóporo is located at the top of the Hill, is a ceremonial zone, Acropolis style.

In this group and Gotas, human burials were found. Most outstanding of these findings has been the pigmentation with several black layers found in the skeletons, presupposes the existence of worship rituals of their dead.

=== Gotas ===
This Conjunto is located on the skirts of the hill, it is a civic-administrative space.

Recent excavations have identified the building as a housing residential unit, from wood remains found, used as columns to support a roof. Carbon-14 dating analysis of these remains provided a date of 500 to 900 CE.

=== Montés ===
This Conjunto, is a residential zone.

=== Caracol ===
This Conjunto appear to also be a residential area, has defensive elements as dirt-stone fences.

=== Llano ===
The Conjunto is located in the lower part, there are various public and domestic areas as well as workshops.

=== Aire ===
It is likely that the gravel road at this conjunto was access for pilgrims to the sacred places at the site.

== Structures ==
=== Plaza 1 ===
This plaza will remain in its original conditions with some excavations and boreholes to demonstrate how it was found.

=== Plaza 2 ===
It is part of Conjunto Gotas, has been released and consolidated one 100 percent. Has a 5,000 square meters extension, consists of four platforms, the east and north have the most important structures.

==== Eastern Platform ====
It is surrounded by a slope made from stone and adobe, covered with masonry; It has a stairway that leads to a corridor that heads to a hall, with 20 wooden columns arranged in three rows, feature that makes the site unique throughout the region.

These 20 columns probably refer to Mesoamerican calendars, that have equal number of days. Accesses and facades are oriented towards the west, probably its inhabitants made astronomical observations, and linked the ceremonies with the solar cycle.

At the back of the hall is another stairway to a second level, where there is a small corridor with a small lounge and 10 columns around a central atrium.

==== Northern Platform ====
It has a long and wide base stone made with three structures, the center is known as the Palace, has a stairway and a room with four columns oriented towards the south, which reminds a pitched (gabled) roof.

To the sides of the Palace, are access stairs to another level with their respective lounge and columns, the room probably was a civic or administrative space.

=== Southern and Western Platforms ===
These completely surround Plaza 2, have much smaller dimensions, and comprise rooms divided by adobe walls and some stoves that suggest that it would be the kitchen for great ceremonies.

== Site conditions ==
There is destruction of ceramic utensils, hunting pieces, molcajetes and remnants of houses that are not more than 20 centimeters deep. Some pieces remain on the surface, mixed with manure from livestock grazing on the area.

Negligence in preserving the site is reported on the part of INAH, Government of Guanajuato and Municipal.

== Bibliography ==
- Flores Morales, Luz María; Ana María Crespo Oviedo (1988). "Elementos cerámicos de asentamientos toltecas en Guanajuato y Querétaro". In Mari Carmen Serra Puche; Carlos Navarrete Cáceres (eds.). Ensayos de alfarería prehispánica e histórica de Mesoamérica: homenaje a Eduardo Noguera Auza. Arqueología: Serie antropológica, no. 82 (in Spanish). México D.F.: Universidad Nacional Autónoma de México. pp. 205–220. ISBN 968-837-956-5. OCLC 433603072.
- INAH (24 August 2009). "Avanzan trabajos de El Cóporo". Boletines: Zonas arqueológicas (in Spanish). México D.F.: Instituto Nacional de Antropología e Historia.
- Rodríguez, Martín Diego (24 April 2007a). "Entre estiércol, vestigios de zona arqueológica" (online edition). La Jornada (in Spanish). México, D.F.: Desarrollo de Medios. ISSN 0188-2392. OCLC 14208832.
- Rodríguez, Martín Diego (25 April 2007b). "Niega el INAH abandono de la zona arqueológica en Ocampo, Guanajuato" (online edition). La Jornada (in Spanish). México, D.F.: Desarrollo de Medios. ISSN 0188-2392. OCLC 14208832.
- Torreblanca Padilla, Carlos Alberto (July–August 2008). "El Cóporo, Guanajuato". Arqueología Mexicana (in Spanish). 16 (92). México, D.F.: Instituto Nacional de Antropología e Historia, Editorial Raíces: 60–63. ISSN 0188-8218. OCLC 29789840. Archived from the original on 2011-07-28.
