= Mixtón War =

War (1540–1542) between Caxcan and Spanish conquerors

- Part of the Spanish colonization of the Americas and Mexican Indian Wars
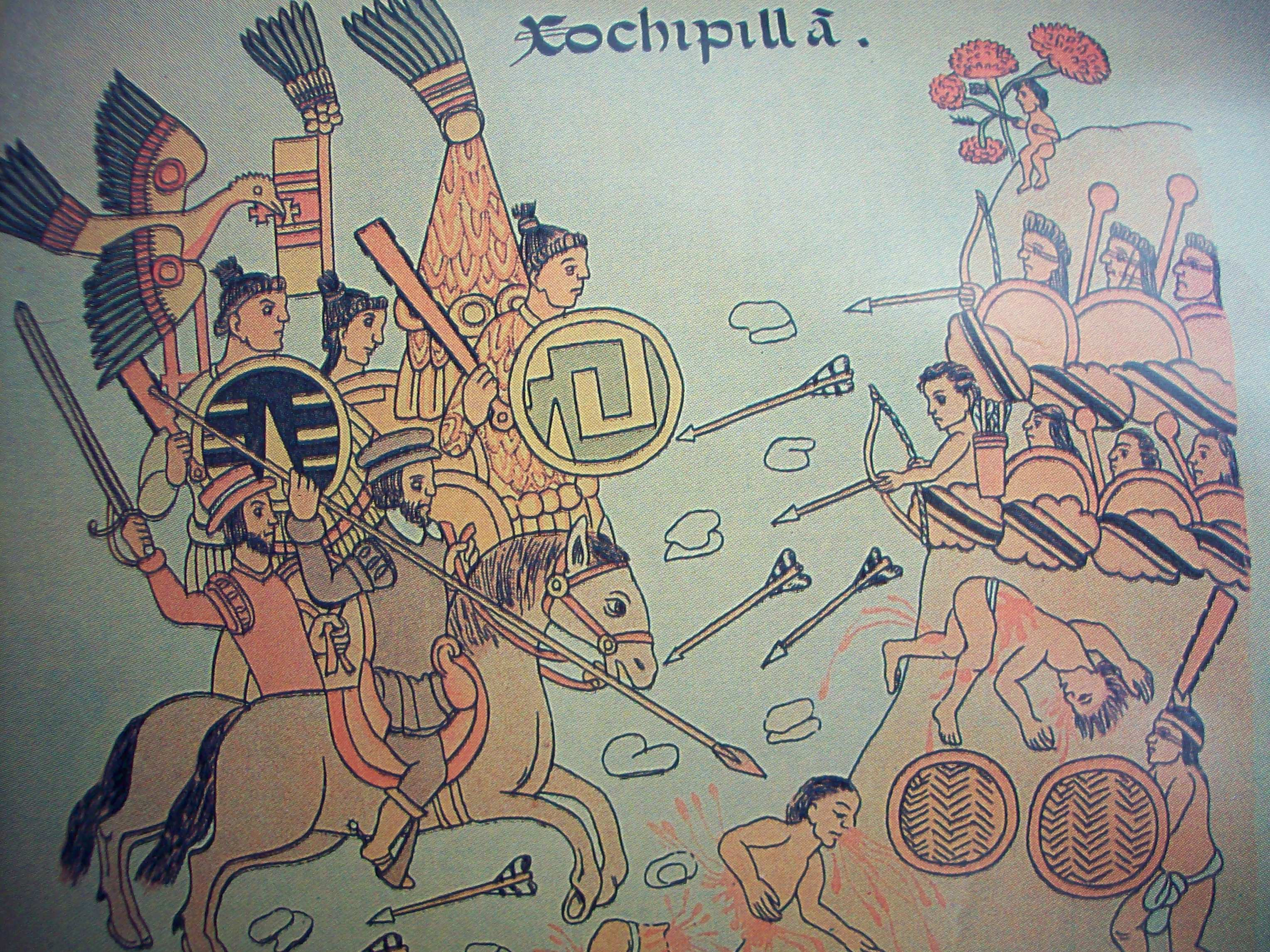
- Viceroy Antonio de Mendoza and Tlaxcalans battle with the Caxcanes
Date	1540 – 1542
Location	Modern-day Mexico
Result	Spaniard and indigenous allied victory

Belligerents
New Spain Indigenous peoples: Tlaxcalans Mexica	Caxcanes

Commanders and leaders
(Spain) Pedro de Alvarado † (Spain) Antonio de Mendoza	Francisco Tenamaztle

The Mixtón War (1540–1542) was an uprising by Caxcan people aimed at pushing the Spanish conquistadors out of northwestern Mexico and bringing the area back under indigenous control. The war was named after Mixtón, a hill in Zacatecas which served as an Indigenous stronghold.

== Caxcanes ==
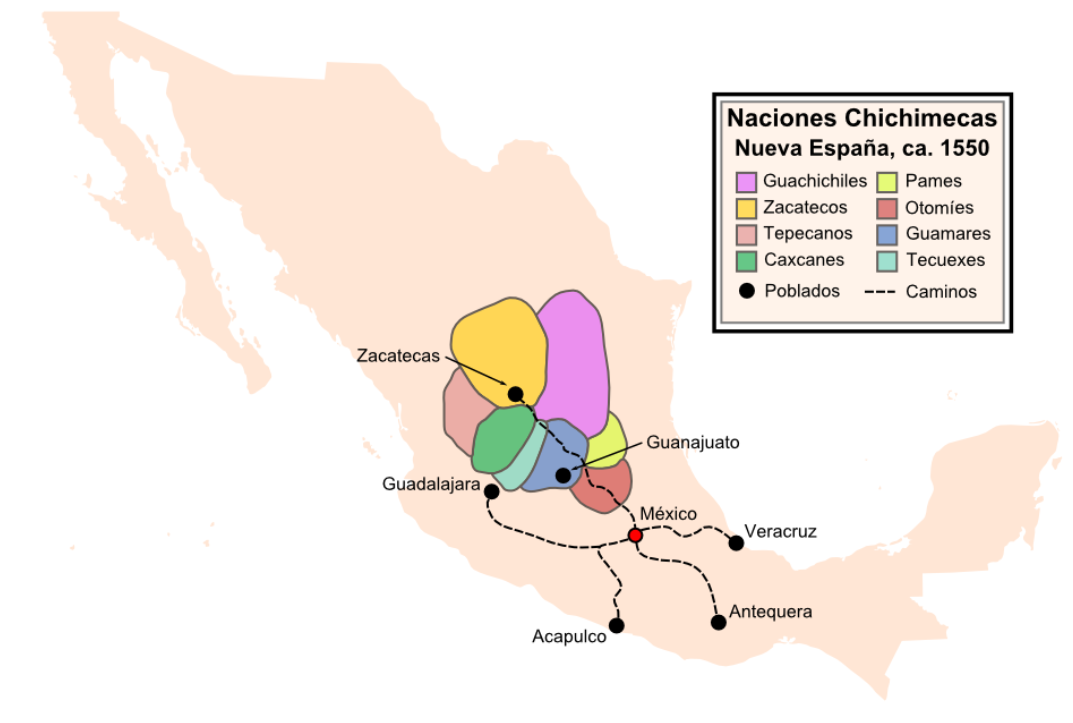
The location of the native peoples in the area in which the Mixton War was fought

Although other indigenous groups also fought against the Spanish in the Mixtón War, the Caxcanes were the "heart and soul" of the resistance. The Caxcanes lived in the northern part of the present-day Mexican state of Jalisco, in southern Zacatecas, and Aguascalientes. They are often considered part of the Chichimeca, a generic term used by the Spaniards and Aztecs for all the nomadic and semi-nomadic Native Americans living in the deserts of northern Mexico. However, the Caxcanes seem to have been sedentary, depending upon agriculture for their livelihood and living in permanent towns and settlements. They were, perhaps, the most northerly of the agricultural, town-and-city dwelling peoples of interior Mexico. The Caxcanes are believed to have spoken a Uto-Aztecan language. Other Native Americans participating in the revolt were the Zacatecos from the state of the same name.

== Background ==
The first contact of the Caxcanes and other indigenous peoples of northwestern Mexico with the Spanish, was in 1529 when Nuño Beltrán de Guzmán set forth from Mexico City with 300-400 Spaniards and 5,000 to 8,000 Aztec and Tlaxcalan allies on a march through Nayarit, Jalisco, Durango, Sinaloa, and Zacatecas. Over a six-year period Guzmán, who was brutal even by the standards of the day, killed, tortured, and enslaved thousands of natives. Guzmán’s policy was to "terrorize the natives with often unprovoked killing, torture, and enslavement". Guzmán and his lieutenants founded towns and Spanish settlements in the region, called Nueva Galicia, including Guadalajara in or near the homeland of the Caxcanes. But the Spaniards encountered increased resistance as they moved further from the complex hierarchical societies of Central Mexico and attempted to force natives into servitude through the encomienda system.

== War ==
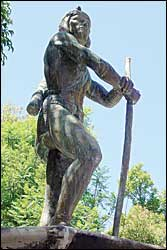
Francisco Tenamaztle, indigenous leader in the Mixtón War, statue on the main square of Nochistlán de Mejía, Zacatecas

In spring 1540, the Caxcanes and their allies struck back, emboldened perhaps by the fact that Governor Francisco Vásquez de Coronado had taken more than 1,600 Spaniards and indigenous allies from the region northward with him on his expedition to what would become the American southwest. The province was thus bereft of many of its most competent soldiers. The spark that set off the war was apparently the arrest of eighteen rebellious indigenous leaders and the hanging of nine of them in mid-1540. Later in the same year the natives rose up to kill, roast, and eat the encomendero Juan de Arze. Spanish authorities also became aware that the natives were participating in "devilish" dances. After killing two Catholic priests, many natives fled the encomiendas and took refuge in the mountains, especially in the hill fortress of Mixtón. Acting Governor Cristóbal de Oñate led a Spanish and native force to quell the rebellion. The Caxcanes killed a delegation of one priest and ten Spanish soldiers. Oñate attempted to storm Mixtón, but the natives on the summit repelled his attack. Oñate then requested reinforcements from the capital, Mexico City.

The command structure of the Caxcanes is unknown but the most prominent leader who emerged among them was Tenamaztle of Nochistlán, Zacatecas.

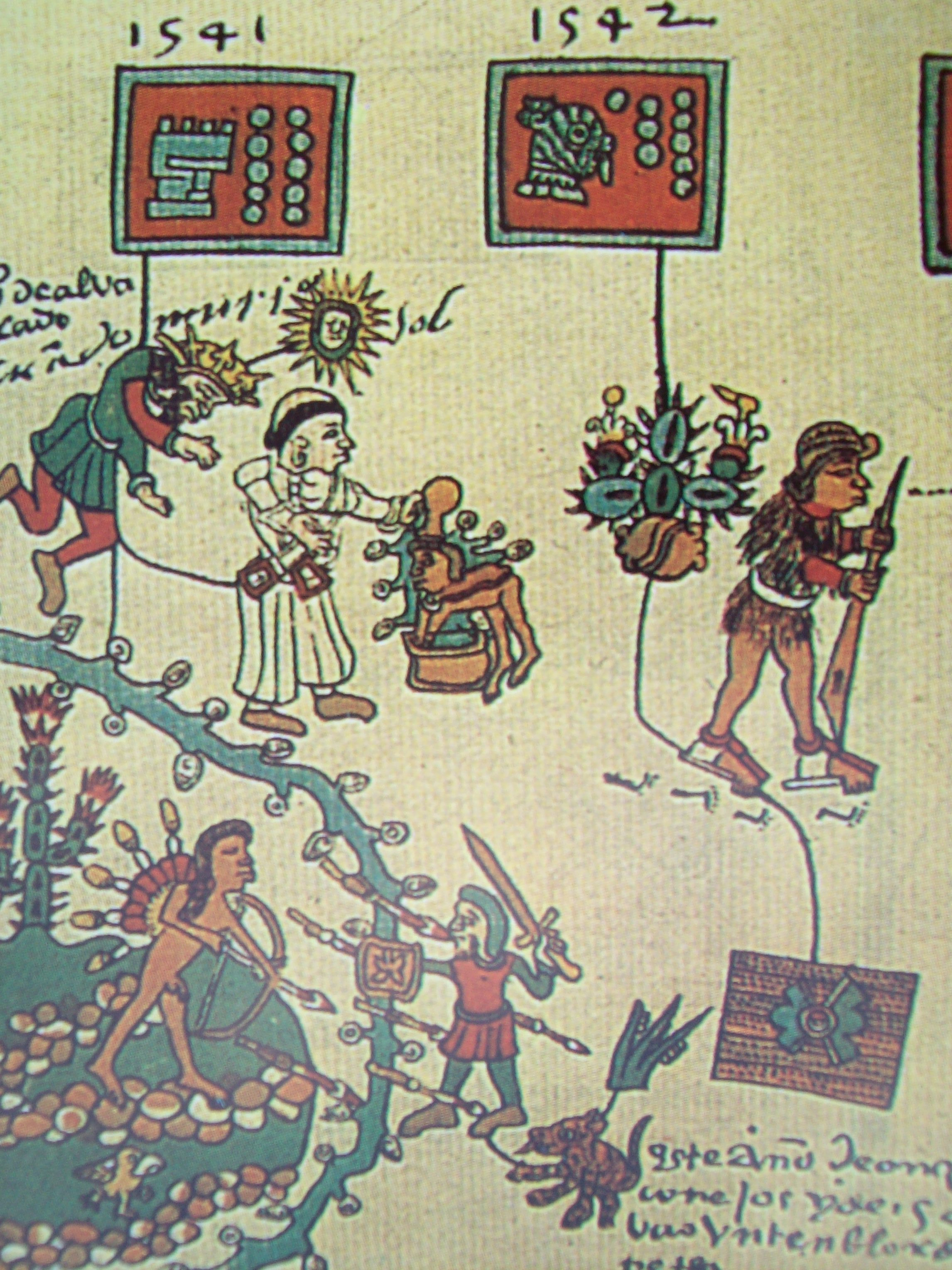
The death of Pedro de Alvarado is pictured at the top left. The indigenous leader Francisco Tenamaztle faces Viceroy Antonio de Mendoza at the bottom left.

Viceroy Antonio de Mendoza called upon the experienced conquistador Pedro de Alvarado to assist in putting down the revolt. Alvarado declined to await reinforcements and attacked Mixtón in June 1541 with 400 Spaniards and an unknown number of indigenous allies. He was met there by an estimated 15,000 natives under Tenamaztle and Don Diego, a Zacateco. The first attack of the Spanish was repulsed with 10 Spaniards and many indigenous allies killed. Subsequent attacks by Alvarado were also unsuccessful and on June 24 Alvarado was injured when a horse fell on him. He died on July 4.

Emboldened, the natives attacked the city of Guadalajara in September but were repulsed. The indigenous army retired to Nochistlán and other strongpoints. The Spanish authorities were now thoroughly alarmed and feared that the revolt would spread. They assembled a force of 450 Spaniards and 30,000-60,000 Aztec, Tlaxcalan, and other natives, and under Viceroy Antonio de Mendoza invaded the land of the Caxcanes. With his overwhelming force, Mendoza reduced the indigenous strongholds one-by-one in a war of no quarter. On November 9, 1541, he captured the city of Nochistlán and Tenamzaztle, but the indigenous leader later escaped. Tenamaztle would remain at large as a guerilla until 1550. In early 1542 the stronghold of Mixtón fell to the Spaniards and the rebellion was over. In the aftermath of the natives' defeat, "thousands were dragged off in chains to the mines, and many of the survivors (mostly women and children) were transported from their homelands to work on Spanish farms and haciendas." By the viceroy's order, many of those captured after the fall of Mixtón were executed, some by cannon fire, some torn apart by dogs, and others stabbed. The reports of the excessive violence caused the Council of the Indies to undertake a secret investigation into the conduct of the viceroy.

== Aftermath ==
As one authority said, the success of Cortés in defeating the Aztecs in only two years "created an illusion of European superiority over the Indian as a warrior." However, the Spanish victories over the Aztecs and other complex societies "proved to be but a prelude to a far longer military struggle against the peculiar and terrifying prowess of Indian America’s more primitive warriors."

Victory in the Mixtón War enabled the Spanish to control the region in which Guadalajara, Jalisco, Mexico’s second largest city, was located. It also opened up Spanish access to the deserts of the north in which Spanish explorers would search for and find rich silver deposits.

After their defeat the Caxcanes were absorbed into Spanish society and lost their identity as a distinct people. They would later serve as auxiliaries to Spanish soldiers in their continued advance northward. Spanish expansion after the Mixtón War would lead to the longer and even more bloody Chichimeca War (1550–1590). The Spanish were forced to change their policy from one of forcibly subjugating the native population to accommodation and gradual absorption, a process taking centuries.

The Caxcanes possibly survive into the 21st century, at least in folk festivals, as the Tastuane people. Annual fiestas of the Tastuanes in towns such as Moyahua de Estrada, and Apozol, Zacatecas, commemorate the Mixtón War.

== See also ==
- Antonio de Mendoza
- Nuño de Guzmán
- Pedro de Alvarado
- La Gran Chichimeca
