= Caxcan language =

Extinct language of Mexico

Caxcan
- Cazcan
- Native to: Mexico
- Region: Zacatecas
- Ethnicity: Caxcan
- Era: attested 16th-17th centuries
- Language family: Uto-Aztecan: Corachol? Nahuan?; Caxcan

Language codes
- ISO 639-3: None (mis)
- Linguist List: 0w2
- Glottolog: None
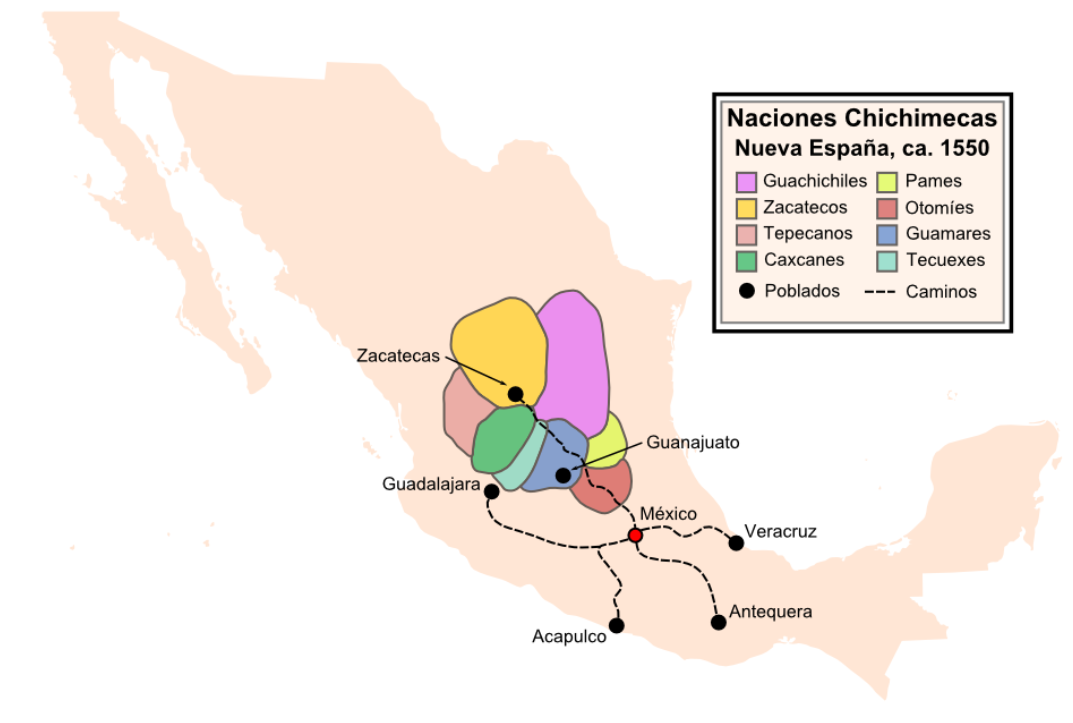
- Caxcan

Caxcan or Cazcan (Kaskán) was the language of the Caxcan, one of the Chichimeca peoples of Mexico. It is known only from a few word lists recorded in the 16th and 17th centuries. The language was definitely part of the Uto-Aztecan family, perhaps most closely related to Huichol or Southern Tepehuan. Other hypotheses include a close relationship with Nahuan, and according to José Ignacio Dávila Garibi, the Caxcan language was mutually intelligible with Classical Nahuatl. There appear to have been dialectal differences between the major Caxcan valleys, and it is likely that several other languages were spoken in Caxcan territory.

== Lexicon ==
Among the few words attested are cazcan "there isn't any" (the response to the first Spanish demand for food), yecotl "quemedor", and aguano "war chief".

== See also ==
- List of extinct Uto-Aztecan languages
