= Caxcan =

Ethnic group of western and north-central Mexico

Caxcan Cazcan
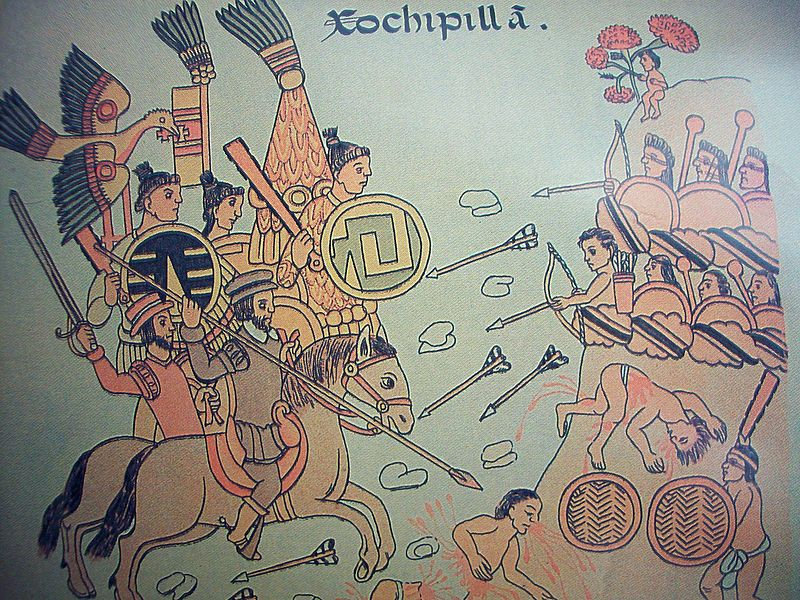
- Caxcan warriors battling against the Spaniards

Total population
- Unknown

Regions with significant populations
- Western and North-Central Mexico

Languages
- Caxcan and Spanish

Related ethnic groups
- Other Chichimecas, possibly Mexicaneros, Coca people, Zacatec, Tecuexe, other Nahuas

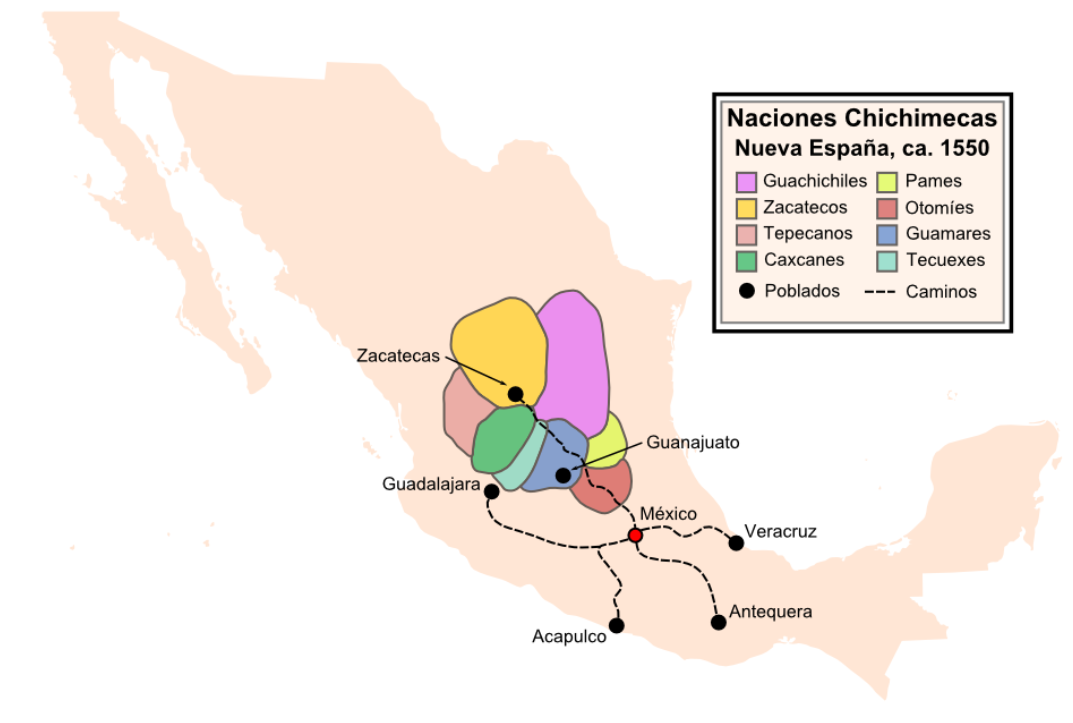
Map of the Caxcan and surrounding nations during the 16th century

The Caxcan are an ethnic group who are Indigenous to western and north-central Mexico, particularly the regions corresponding to modern-day Zacatecas, southern Durango, Jalisco, Colima, Aguascalientes, Nayarit. The Caxcan language is most often described as an ancient variant of Nahuatl and is a member of the Uto-Aztecan language family. The last generation of natively fluent Caxcan language speakers came to an end in the 1890s, according to anthropologist Aleš Hrdlička. Despite this having long been conflated by anthropologists with an extinction of the Caxcan people themselves, much of Caxcan culture has persisted via oral tradition. There is currently an ongoing revitalization of Caxcan language, scholarship, and culture.

== History ==
=== Before 1550 ===
The Caxcan were a partly nomadic, partly sedentary people. Under their leader, Tenamaztle, the Caxcan were allied with the Zacatecos against the Spaniards during the Mixtón Rebellion in 1540–42. During the rebellion, they were described as "the heart and the center of the Indian Rebellion". After the rebellion, they were a constant target of the Zacatecos and Guachichiles due to their ceasefire agreement with the Spaniards. Their principal religious and population centers were at Teul, Tlaltenango, Juchipila, and Teocaltiche.

Over time, the Caxcanes lost their culture due to warfare, disease, and marriage to non-Caxcanes. During the colonial period, many Spanish (and some Basque settlers) had intermarried, or had relations, with the Caxcanes making many Caxcan descendants Mestizos. The allied tribes and Mestizos settled the Caxcan lands in Zacatecas and Jalisco.

Their elected rulers were called tlatoani. Caxcan society was divided up into several different city-states.

=== The Chichimeca War (1550–1590) ===
The Chichimeca War (1550–1590) was a military conflict waged between Spanish colonizers and their Indian allies against a confederation of Chichimeca Indians. It was the longest and most expensive conflict between Spaniards and the indigenous peoples of New Spain in the history of the colony.

The Chichimeca wars began eight years after the Mixtón Rebellion (1540–1542). It can be considered as a continuation of that rebellion as the fighting did not come to a halt in the intervening years. Unlike in the Mixtón rebellion, the Caxcanes were now allied with the Spanish. The war was fought in the Bajío region known as La Gran Chichimeca, specifically in the Mexican states of Zacatecas, Guanajuato, Aguascalientes, Jalisco, and San Luis Potosi.

=== 1900–2000 ===
The Council of the Caxcan indigenous people was formed in the 1920s by Juana Belén Gutiérrez de Mendoza, a Caxcan from Durango. She also published Alto!, a book which stressed Mexican Nationalism through indigenous roots and, even after the alleged extinction of the Caxcan people.

=== 2000–present ===
Caxcan people continue to live in Zacatecas and in diaspora. They are currently attempting to regain legal access to their sacred mountain, Tlachialoyantepec (El Cerro de las Ventanas).

The Mexican government officially recognizes four communities in southern Zacatecas as Caxcan.
