= Codex Tlatelolco =

Codex Tlatelolco is a colonial-era Aztec codex written on amatl, around 1565. It depicts royal ceremonies involving Spanish monarchs Charles V and his son and successor Philip II. The pictorials show the jura (oath) ceremony of swearing the oath of allegiance to the new Spanish monarch, Philip following the abdication of his father in 1556, performed in the Plaza Mayor of Zócalo in 1557. There are depictions of Charles V and Philip II, as well as the indigenous rulers of Tlatelolco and Tenochtitlan, (former altepetl that became sectors of the Spanish capital of Mexico City), who along with all officials took the oath of allegiance. There is a written account in Spanish that differs from that depicted in the pictorial. The pictorial account omits the presence of the Spanish cabildo members. The codex refers to the indigenous participation in the Mixtón War ca. 1542, a major indigenous rebellion in western Mexico. Its depictions of Nahua dances and nearly full-body feather costumes make it particularly important for understanding indigenous cultural continuities in the early colonial period. The manuscript is held in the National Library of the Mexican Museum of Anthropology and History in Mexico City.
