= Miguel Caldera =

- Born: 1548; Zacatecas, Mexico
- Died: 1597 (aged 48–49); San Luis Potosí, Mexico
- Military career
- Allegiance: Spanish Crown
- Rank: Captain
- Conflicts: Chichimeca War

Miguel Caldera (1548–1597) was an important figure in the colonization of Mexico's northern frontier immediately following the Spanish conquest of the Aztec Empire.

== Early life ==
Caldera was the illegitimate son of a Castilian soldier named Pedro Caldera and a Guachichil woman named Maria. He was born in 1548 in what later became the city of Zacatecas and was raised by Franciscan friars in the city's monastery.

== Military career ==
Caldera entered the Chichimeca War in 1571 or 1572 at the age of 24 or 25 as a common soldier with the help of his brother-in-law Hernàn Gonzales. He obtained the rank of captain before 1580.

The cruelty and futility of the Spanish Crown's efforts to subdue the Chichimecas by brute force left an impression on him. He advocated the use of diplomacy and gift-giving instead. The success of his alternative policy led to his appointment as Chief Justice and District Mayor of the Valley of Tlaltenango and Jerez. In that role he was the principal implementor of the Spanish Crown's pacification program in the region of Zacatecas, northern Jalisco and San Luis Potosí.

Caldera was instrumental in the migration of 400 Tlaxcaltec families in 1591 to the newly pacified region to help Christianize the local indigenous populations and consolidate the peace. The consolidation of peace during his tenure facilitated the settlement of the region and the eventual Spanish occupation of what would, two and a half centuries later, become the American Southwest.

== Career as Miner ==
In March 1592, Caldera sent a group of miners and soldiers from Mezquitic to the region of Cerro San Pedro to survey and register some newly discovered mines. Upon ascertaining the mines' potential the place was named Potosí after the famous mines in Peru. As settlement of the mines began, the lack of water near the mines became problematic. The permanent settlement, which was initially populated by Tlaxcaltec families, was named San Luis Potosí. Miguel Caldera is considered one of the founders of this city.

== Late life ==
Caldera acquired considerable wealth during his lifetime including claims on a number of newly discovered mines in the region that he administered. He was never married, but fathered an illegitimate daughter named Isabel. She married Juan de la Torre and was the mother of two sons: Marcos and Melchor. Research shows that Catarina Caldera, also called, Catarina Cid Caldera, as well as, Juana Caldera, are also, most likely, the illegitimate children of Miguel Caldera. Catarina, born around 1595, married Rodrigo Pinedo. Juana married Miguel de Olagüe Etulain. Miguel Caldera also had a sister (possibly half-sister) named Maria Cid Caldera, who was married to Hernán González, a close collaborator of Caldera in the administration of the town of Colotlán, one of the Tlaxcaltec frontier colonies he helped found. The son of this couple, Pedro Cid Caldera was the primary heir of Caldera upon his death in 1597.

== Sources ==
- Philip Wayne Powell, Mexico's Miguel Caldera: The Taming of Ameríca's First Frontier (1548–1597).
