= Chichimeca War =

Spanish invasion of the Central Mexican Plateau (1550–1600)

- Part of the Spanish colonization of the Americas and Mexican Indian Wars
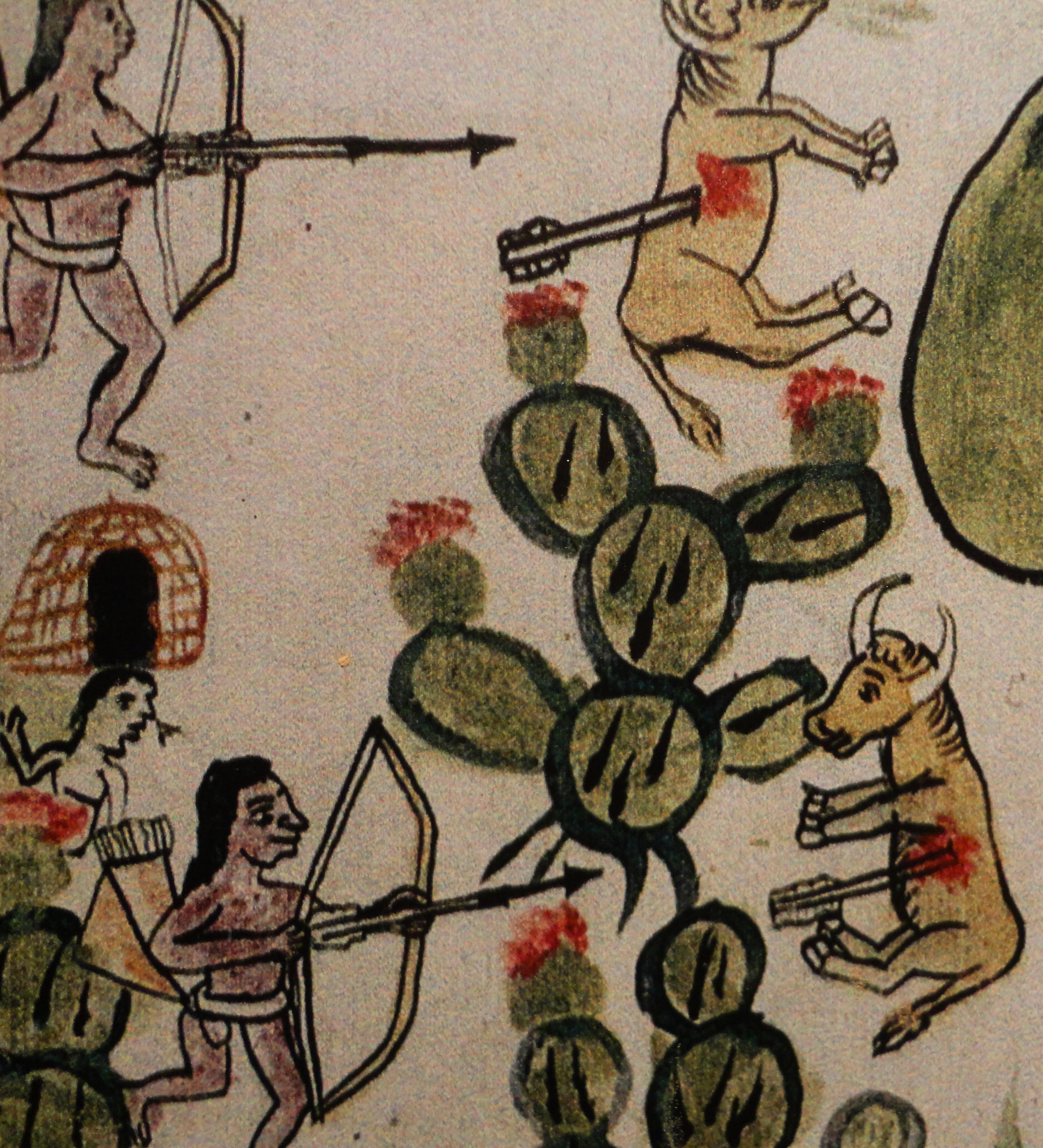
- 1580 codex depicting a battle at San Francisco Chamacuero in the current state of Guanajuato
Date	1550–1600 (50 years)
Location	La Gran Chichimeca, New Spain
Result	Chichimeca military victory; Spanish sued for peace, ceasing hostilities; Chichimeca conversion into sedentary, Catholic lifestyle; Benefits gained by Spain's native allies, including Tlaxcalans; Beginning of Spanish missionary tactics on northern colonial frontier; Partial preservation of Chichimeca culture, identity, and language

Belligerents
Chichimeca Confederation; Zacatecos; Caxcanes; Guachichiles; Pames; Guamares	Spain; Allies & auxiliaries: Tlaxcalteca; Otomí; Mexica; Purépecha

Commanders and leaders
Maxorro; Çayne; Yuac; Martinillo; Cacayas; Macolia; Acuaname; Nachancayal; Gualiname; Francisco "the Lame"; Copuz the Elder; Nacoloname; Quiatuiaya; Paqualame; Xale; Bartolomillo; Anton Rayado	Pedro de Anda; Hernando Martel; Miguel Caldera

The Chichimeca War (1550–1600) was a military conflict between the Spanish Empire and the Chichimeca Confederation established in the territories today known as the Central Mexican Plateau (called La Gran Chichimeca by the conquistadores). The epicenter of the hostilities was the region now called the Bajío. The Chichimeca War is recorded as both the longest and most expensive military campaign confronting the Spanish Empire and indigenous people in Aridoamerica. The 50-year conflict was settled through several peace treaties with the Spaniards which led to the pacification and, ultimately, the integration of the native populations into the New Spain society.

The war began 8 years after the two-year Mixtón War (1540–1542). It can be considered a continuation of the rebellion as the fighting did not come to a halt in the intervening years. The war was fought in what are the present-day Mexican states of Zacatecas, Guanajuato, Aguascalientes, Jalisco, Queretaro, and San Luis Potosí.

== Prelude ==
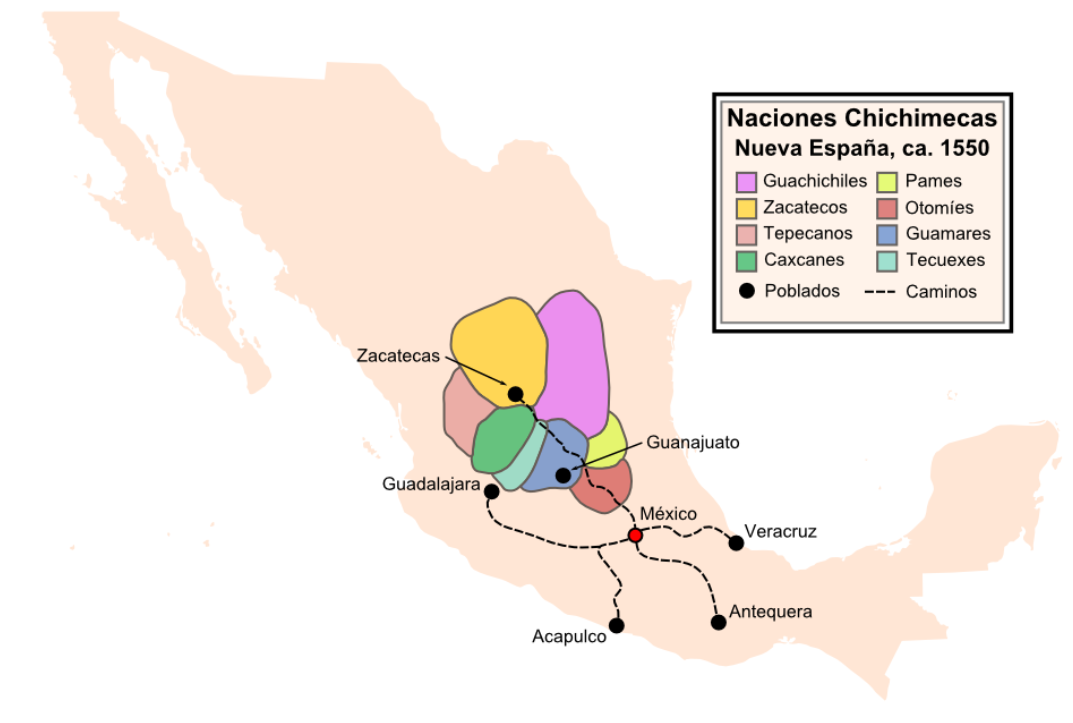
Chichimeca Tribes throughout the Gran Chichimeca

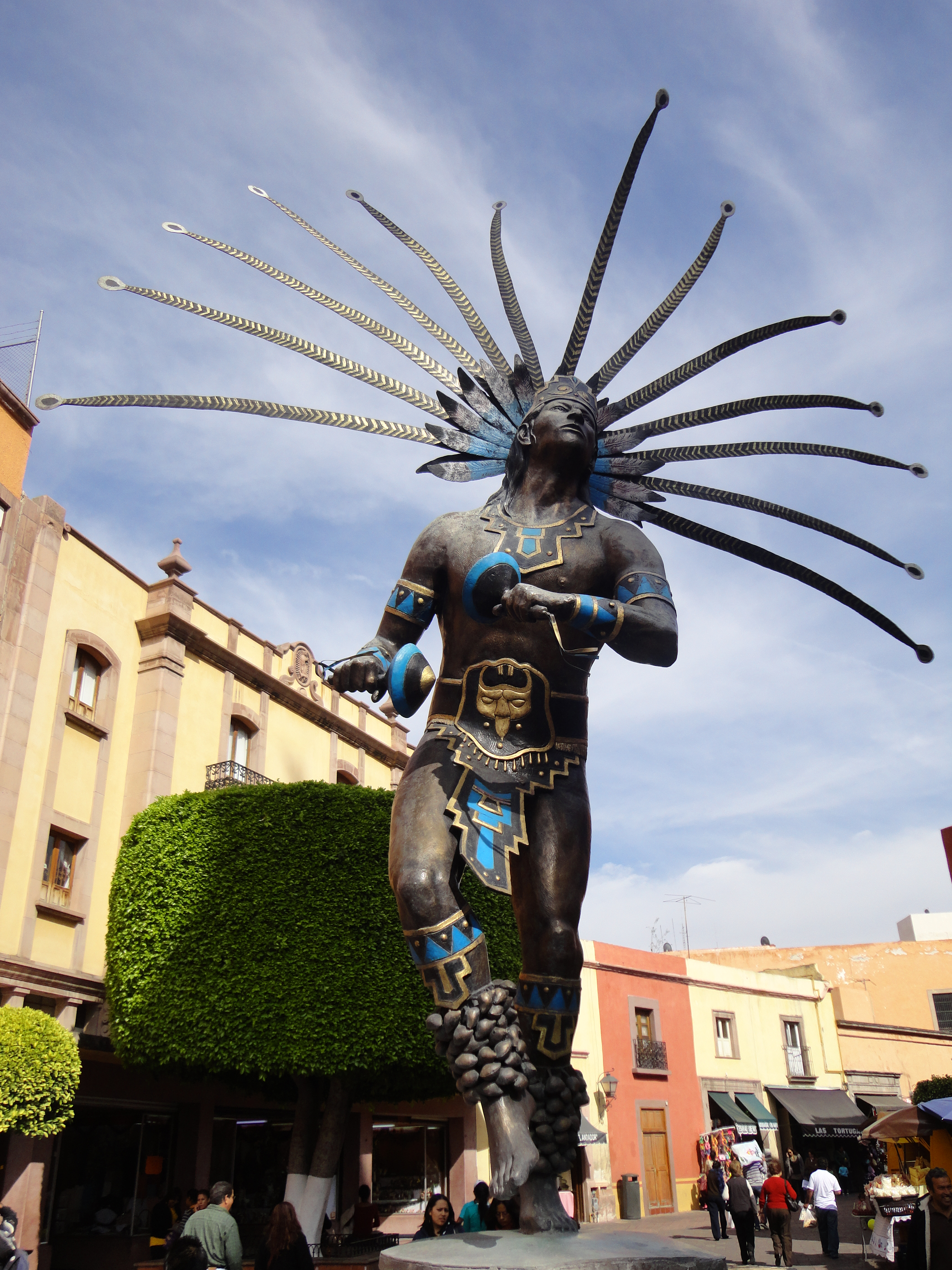
A statue of a Chichimeca warrior in the city of Querétaro

On September 8, 1546, natives near the Cerro de la Bufa in what would become the city of Zacatecas showed the Spaniard Juan de Tolosa several pieces of silver-rich ore. News of the silver strike soon spread across New Spain. The dream of quick wealth caused a large number of Spaniards to migrate from southern Mexico to the present-day city of Zacatecas in the heartland of La Gran Chichimeca. Soon the mining towns of San Martín, Chalchihuites, Avino, Sombrerete, Fresnillo, Mazapil, and Nieves were established. The Chichimeca nations resented the intrusions by the Spanish on their sovereign ancestral lands. Spanish soldiers soon began raiding native territory trying to acquire slaves for the mines. To supply and communicate with the mines in and near Zacatecas, new roads were built from Querétaro and Jalisco across Chichimeca lands. The caravans full of goods along the roads were economic targets for Chichimecan warriors.

== Chichimecas ==
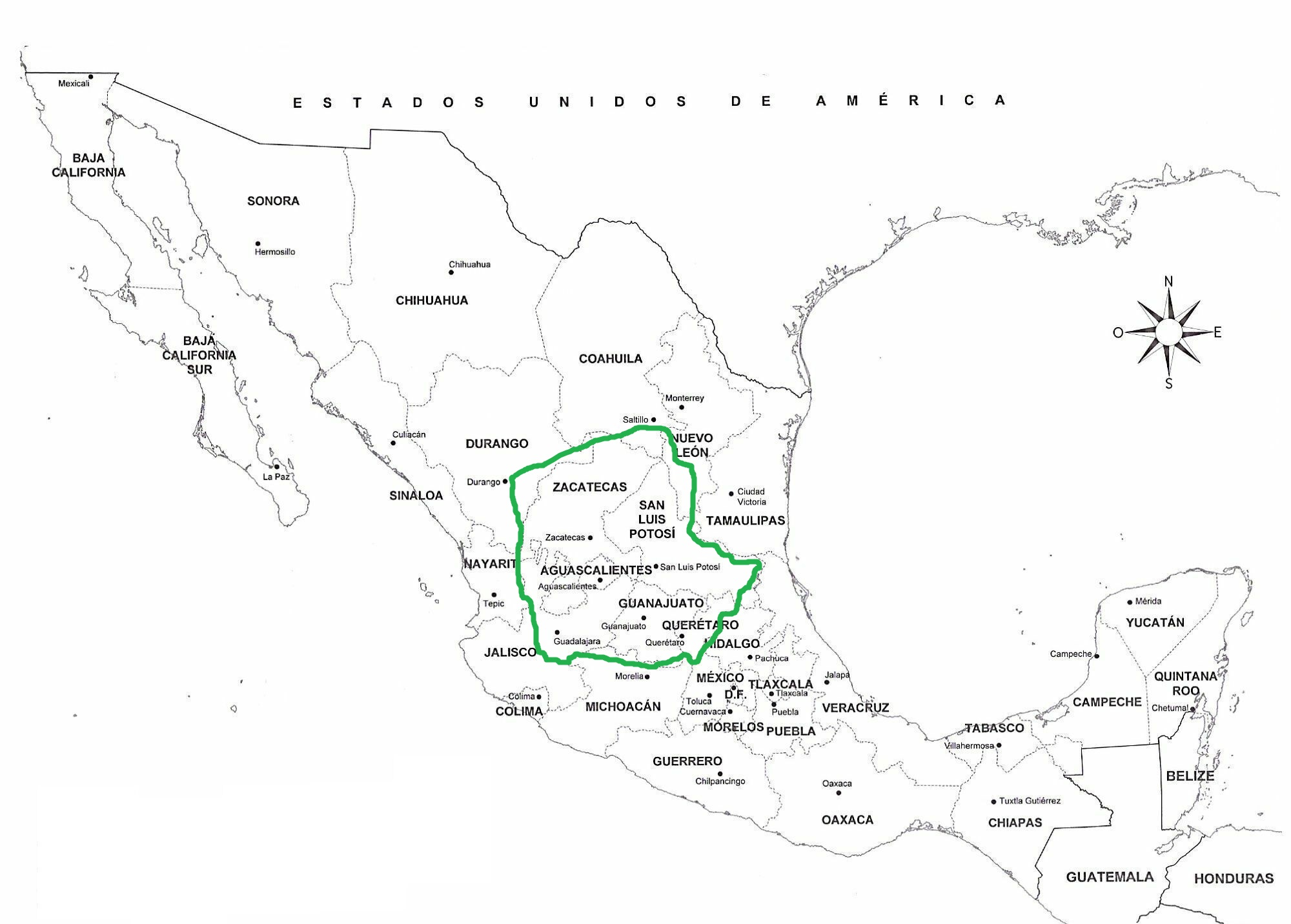
Area of Mexico known as La Gran Chichimeca to the Spanish at the time of the conflict

The Chichimecas were nomadic and semi-nomadic people who occupied the large desert basin stretching from present day Saltillo and Durango in the north to Querétaro and Guadalajara in the south. Within this area of about 160,000 square kilometres (62,000 sq mi), the Chichimecas lived primarily by hunting and gathering, especially mesquite beans, the edible parts of the agave plants, and the fruit (tunas) and leaves of cactus. In favored areas some of the Chichimeca grew corn and other crops. The Chichimeca population is hard to estimate, although based on the average density of nomadic cultures they probably numbered 30,000 to 60,000. The Chichimecas lived in rancherías of crude shelters or natural shelters such as caves, frequently moving from one area to another to take advantage of seasonal foods and hunting. The Chichimeca referred to themselves as "Children of the Wind", living religiously from the natural land. The characteristics most noted about them by the Spanish was that both women and men wore little clothing, grew their hair long, and painted and tattooed their bodies. They were often accused of cannibalism, although this accusation has been disputed, due to the Spanish attempt to smear natives as savages in order to justify forced conversion to Catholicism by Spain during the Mexican Inquisition.

The Chichimecas Confederation consisted of four main nations: Guachichiles, Pames, Guamares, and Zacatecos. These nations had decentralized governments, and were more of independent states. Due to decentralized political unity, their territories overlapped and other Chichimecs joined one or another in raids.

The Guachichiles' territory centered on the area around what would become the city of San Luis Potosí. They seem to have been the most numerous of the four ethnic groups and the de facto leaders of the Chichimecas. Their name meant "Red Colored Hair" from a pigment that they also applied to their skin and clothing. Living in close proximity to the silver road between Querétaro and Zacatecas, they were the most feared of the native raiders.

The Pames lived north of the present-day state of Querétaro and south and east of the Guachichiles. They were the least warlike and militant of the Chichimecas. They had absorbed some of the religious and cultural practices of the more urbanized native nations.

The Guamares lived mostly in present-day state of Guanajuato. They possibly had more political unity than other Chichimecas and were considered by one writer as the most "treacherous and destructive of all the Chichimecas and the most astute". The Guamares and the mestizo population of Dolores Hidalgo, on the silver road to San Miguel de Allende, also initiated the Mexican War for Independence, then shortly after sent a battalion of reinforcements to the Battle of Puebla during the French intervention in Mexico.

The Zacatecos lived in the present-day states of Zacatecas and Durango. They had participated in the earlier Mixtón War and thus were experienced fighters against the Spanish. Some of the Zacatecos grew maize; others were nomadic.

The nomadic culture of the Chichimecas made it difficult for the Spanish to defeat them. The bow was their principal weapon and one experienced observer said the Zacatecos were "the best archers in the world." Their bows were short, usually less than four feet long, their arrows were long and thin and made of reed and tipped with obsidian, volcanic rock sharper than a modern-day razor. Despite the fragility of the obsidian arrows they had excellent penetrating qualities, even against Spanish armor which was de rigueur for soldiers fighting the Chichimeca. Many-layered buckskin armor was preferred to chain mail as obsidian arrows penetrated the links of the mail.

The Chichimeca bow and arrow was expertly crafted allowing for penetration of Spanish armor. There are two Spanish accounts of the Chichimeca's archery skill that Powell writes in his book:

On one occasion I saw them throw an orange into the air, and they shot into it so many arrows that, having held it in the air for much time, it finally fell in minute pieces" (Powell 48). "One of don Alonso de Castilla's soldiers had an arrow pass through the head of his horse, including a crownpiece of double buckskin and metal, and into his chest, so he fell with the horse dead on the ground 'this was seen by many who are still living' (Powell 48).

The Chichimeca were a nomadic culture making them very mobile and experts of rough terrain with vegetation filled (mostly cactus) land in which they always looked for hiding spots. "His long use of the food native to the Gran Chichimeca gave him far greater mobility than the sedentary invader, who was tied to domesticated livestock, agriculture, and imported supplies. The Chichimeca could and did cut off these supplies, destroy the livestock, and thus paralyze the economic and military vitality of the invaders; this was seldom possible in reverse" (Powell 44). They attacked in small groups ranging from five to two hundred warriors. In one account, with only fifty Zacateco warriors, the Chichimeca killed two hundred Spanish soldiers in one battle. They had no shortage of raiding parties because of the highly valued supplies attracting warriors from far off allowing for the highest quality of trade goods.

As the war escalated, both the Spanish and Chichimeca adapted and bettered their defensive and offensive tactics. "He [The Chichimeca] sent spies into Spanish towns for appraisal of the enemy's plans and strength; he developed a far-flung system of lookouts and scouts (atalays); and, in major attacks, settlements were softened by preliminary and apparently systematic killing and stealing of horses and other livestock, this being an attempt, sometimes successful, to change his intended victim from horseman to foot soldier" (Powell 46). When they attacked they used a very good tactic that terrified the animals and scared the Spanish. The Guachichil especially would disguise themselves as grotesque animals using animal heads and paint then yelled like crazed beasts making the Spanish lose control of horses and livestock. The Spanish started to set up many forts, bought mercenaries, and tried to use as many slaves as they could.

Chichimeca battle tactics were mostly ambushes and raids on the Spanish. Some of their raids were conducted by up to 200 men, groups of 40 to 50 warriors were more common, about the size of a modern infantry company or platoon with attachments, respectively. During the war, the Chichimecas learned to ride horses and use them in war. This was perhaps the first time that the Spanish in North America faced mounted Native warriors. The undeniable advantage for the Spanish was their use of horses and other animals of burden that they had introduced to the Americas. Horses were extinct in the Americas before the Spanish reintroduced them in 1519.

== Course of the war ==
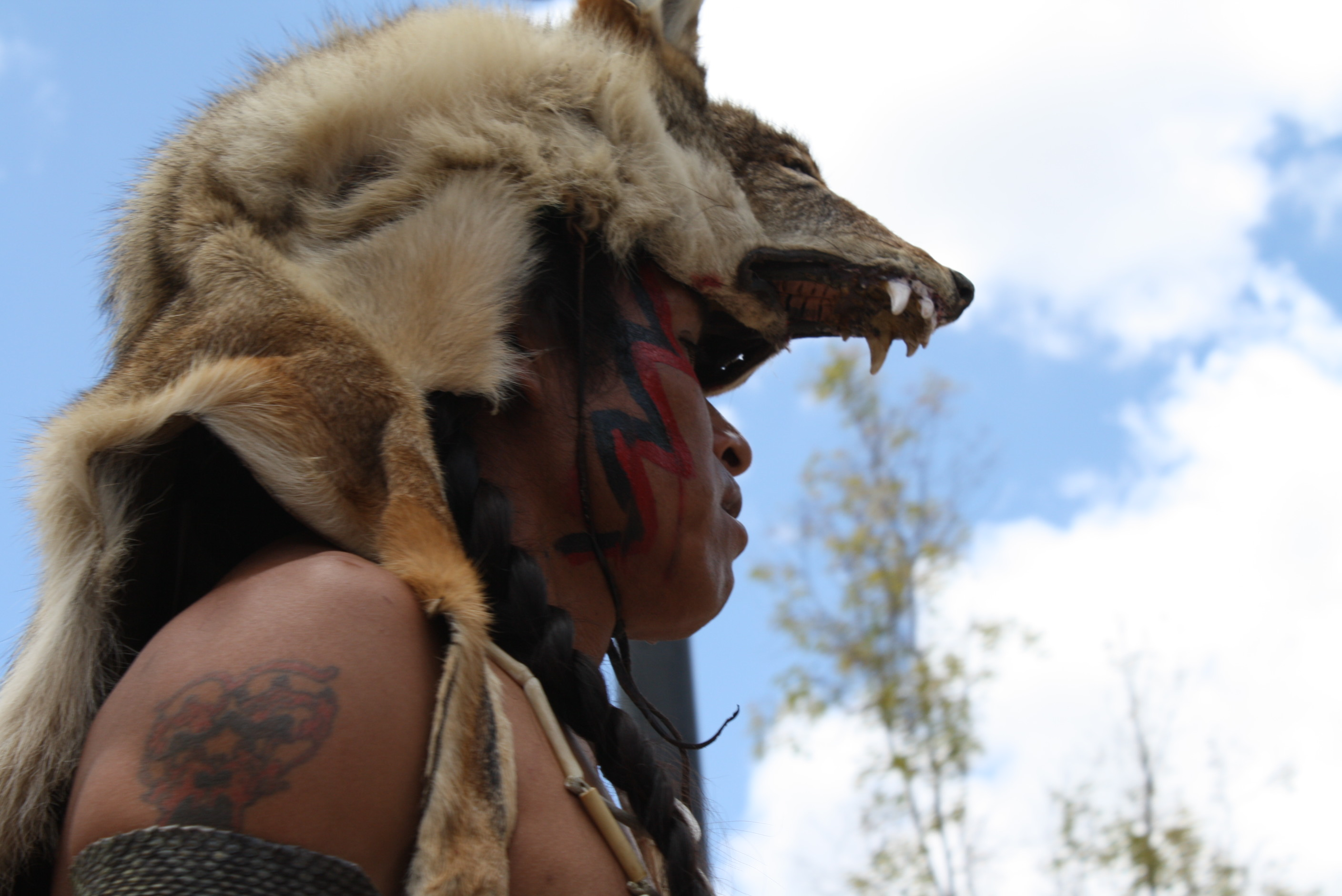
A modern-day Chichimeca Jonaz person participating in a dance in Guanajuato

The conflict proved much more difficult and enduring than the Spanish anticipated. The first outbreak of hostilities was in late 1550 when Zacatecos attacked supply routes of Purépecha. A few days later they were attacking Spanish colonies less than 10 miles (16 km) south of modern-day Zacatecas. In 1551 the Guachichile and Guamares joined in, killing 15 Spanish soldiers at an outpost of San Miguel de Allende and forcing its abandonment. Other raids near Tlaltenango were reported to have killed 120 Spanish within a few months. Some crucial raids of the early years of the war took place in 1553 and 1554 when many wagon trains on the road to Zacatecas were attacked, all the Spanish en route were killed, and the very substantial sums of 32,000 and 40,000 pesos in goods taken or destroyed. (By comparison, the annual salary of a Spanish soldier was only 300 pesos.) By the end of 1561 it was estimated that more than 4,000 Spaniards and their native allies had been killed by the Chichimecas. Prices for imported food and other commodities in Zacetacas had doubled or tripled due to the dangers of transporting the goods to the city. In the 1570s the rebellion spread as Pames began raiding near Querétaro.

The Spanish government first attempted measures of both carrot and stick to attempt to tamp down the war, but, those failing, in 1567 it adopted the policy of a "war of fire and blood" (guerra a fuego y a sangre) – promising death, enslavement, or mutilation to the Chichimeca. One of the priorities of the Spaniards throughout the war was to keep the roads open to Zacatecas and the silver mines – especially the Camino Real from San Miguel de Allende. Without these crucial economic roads open, the Spanish would not be able to fund the war or continue supporting settlements. To do so they created a dozen new presidios (forts), staffed by Spanish soldiers and native ally soldiers, and encouraged more Spanish people to settle in new areas, including what would be the nucleus of the future cities of Celaya, León, Aguascalientes, and San Luis Potosí.

The first main forts were in San Miguel and San Felipe in 1562 and Nombre de Dios in 1563. Yet even then the Chichimeca managed to achieve successes. By 1571, most of the Chichimeca nations were raiding towns and crucial economic routes. A letter from fray Guillermo de Santa María to fray Alonso de Alvarado stated that: "Later those same Zacatecos, made another assault against Onate and Ybara, one legue from Zenaguilla del Monte and three from the mining town of Zacatecas, of which they did a lot of damage" (Santa 220 (1)). After 1560, and especially in the decade of the 1570s, the Chichimecas turned to the raiding of several towns. In a letter written October 31, 1576, the viceroy of New Spain informed King Felipe II of Spain that:

"We need for some quantity of soldiers to be sent, and to be paid a royal salary as agreed upon by the V.M. and of which the V.M. will send to be paid, a third of the Royal Hacienda (in Mexico City), and by the miners and those interested" (Hernandez 326 (2)).

Also reported in the same letter:

"No one can sustain the war, the cost is too big, neither in arms nor in squadrons can we sustain war. The situation is very crucial, we don't have weapons, squadrons, food because every day our livestock gets stolen or killed of which sustaining the cattle has been very difficult. We don't have enough funds to keep the people happy. Everyone agrees that we need support from the royal box" (Hernandez 326 (3)).

Even after offensives were fully financed by the royal treasury; from 1575 to 1585 the Chichimeca started attacking with even greater military force. In a letter from the viceroy of New Spain, Conde de Coruna, to Felipe II on April 1, 1581: "I have let the V.M. understand about the happenings with the Chichimeca War and about how dire the situation is that all the mines in those districts where the Natives are engaging in battle, and with such a great number and that many mines in Zacatecas are closed" (Hernandez 340 (4)). The Spanish did not attain more success even when they tried other tactics of trickery and deceit. The royal road was destroyed and there was no Spanish fort that was not also destroyed within the Guachihile territory.

The increase in number of Spanish soldiers in the Gran Chichimeca was not entirely favorable to the war effort as the soldiers often supplemented their income by slave-raiding, thus reinforcing the animosity of the Chichimeca. Despite the influx of Spanish settlers and soldiers from Southern Mexico to the Gran Chichimeca, the Spanish were always short of soldiers compared to the Chichimeca ever growing recruitment of raiders, often staffing their presidios with only three Spaniards. The Spaniards, even with the assistance from other native soldiers and auxiliaries, especially the Caxcans, the Purépecha, and the Otomi, could not rival the Chichimeca Confederation. The native allies were rewarded with Spanish colonized land, and native soldiers were allowed to ride Spanish horses and carry Spanish swords, formerly banned for use by native allies.

== Purchase for Peace ==
As the war continued unabated, it became clear that the Spanish policy of a war of fire and blood had failed. The royal treasury was being emptied by the demands of the war. Churchmen and others who had initially supported the war of fire and blood now questioned the policy. Mistreatment and enslavement of Chichimeca women, children, and men by Spaniards increasingly came to be seen as the cause of the war. In 1574, the Dominicans, contrary to the Augustinians and Franciscans, declared that the Chichimeca War was unjust and caused by Spanish aggression. Thus, to end the conflict, the Spanish began to change public policy to purchase peace from the Chichimeca and assimilate with them.

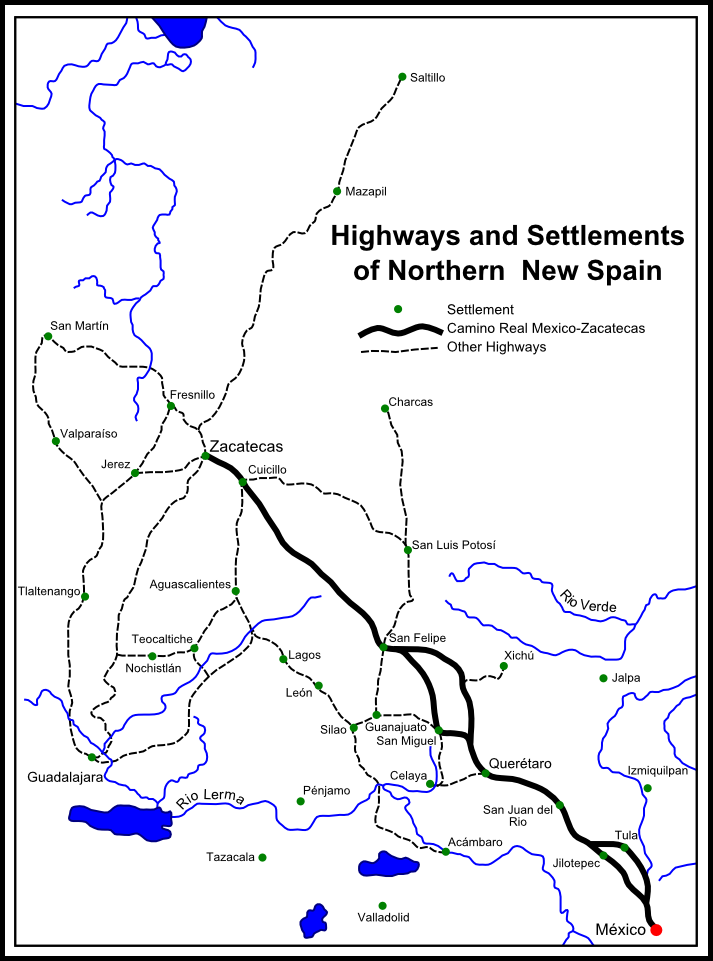
Map of Spanish settlement in the Gran Chichimeca

In 1584, the Bishop of Guadalajara made a proposal for a "Christian remedy" to the war: the establishment of new towns with priests, soldiers, and friendly Indians to gradually Christianize the Chichimecas. The Viceroy, Alvaro Manrique de Zuniga, followed this idea in 1586 with a policy of removing many Spanish soldiers from the frontier as they were considered more a provocation than a remedy. The Viceroy opened negotiations with Chichimeca leaders and negotiated tools, food, clothing, and land to encourage them through "gentle persuasion". He forbade further failing military operations. One of the key people behind these negotiations was Miguel Caldera, a captain who was of both Spanish and Guachichile descent. Beginning in 1590 and continuing for several decades the Spanish implemented the "Purchase for Peace" program by sending large quantities of goods northward to be distributed to the Chichimecas. In 1590 the Viceroy declared the program a success and the roads to Zacatecas safe for the first time in 40 years.

The next step, in 1591, was for a new Viceroy, Luis de Velasco, with help from others such as Caldera, to persuade 400 families of Tlaxcalan Indians, old allies of the Spanish, to establish eight settlements in Chichimeca areas. They served as Christian examples to the Chichimecas and taught animal husbandry and farming to them. In return for moving to the frontier, the Tlaxcalans extracted concessions from the Spanish, including land grants, freedom from taxes, the right to carry arms, and provisions for two years. The Spanish also took steps to curb slavery on Mexico's northern frontier by ordering the arrest of members of the Carabajal family and Gaspar Castaño de Sosa. An essential part of their strategy was conversion of the Chichimeca to Catholicism. The Franciscans sent priests to the frontier to aid in the pacification effort.

The Purchase for Peace program worked to lower the rate of hostilities and the majority of the Chichimecas gradually became sedentary, Catholic, or nominally Catholic.

== Importance ==
The Spanish policy evolved to make peace with the Chichimecas had four components: negotiation of peace agreements; welcoming, instead of forcing, conversion to Catholicism; encouraging native allies to settle the frontier to serve as examples and role models; and providing food, other commodities, and tools to potentially hostile natives. This established the pattern of Spanish policy for assimilating natives on their northern frontier. The principal components of the policy of purchase for peace would continue for nearly three centuries and would not be as successful, as later threats from hostile natives such as Apaches and Comanches would demonstrate.

== Chichimecas today ==
Over time most of the Chichimeca people transformed their ethnic identities and absorbed into the Catholic population and more assimilated in mainstream society before and during the Mexican War of Independence. Large portions of the Guachihil population from La Montesa to Milagros migrated to the larger cities of Zacatecas or Aguascalientes and to the territories of California, Colorado, and Texas.

The Wixárika or Huicholes are believed to be the descendants of the Guachichiles. About 20,000 of them live in an isolated area on the borders of Jalisco and Nayarit. They are noted for being conservative, successfully preserving (Wixárika) their language, religion, and culture.

There are about 10,000 speakers of the Pame languages in Mexico, primarily in Santa María Acapulco in the municipality of Santa Catarina in southeastern San Luis Potosí. They are conservative and nominal Catholics, but mostly still practicing their traditional religion and customs. Another group of about 1,500 Chichimeca Jonaz live in the state of Guanajuato.

== See also ==
- Arauco War
