= Altavista (Zacatecas) =

Archeological Site in Zacatecas, Mexico

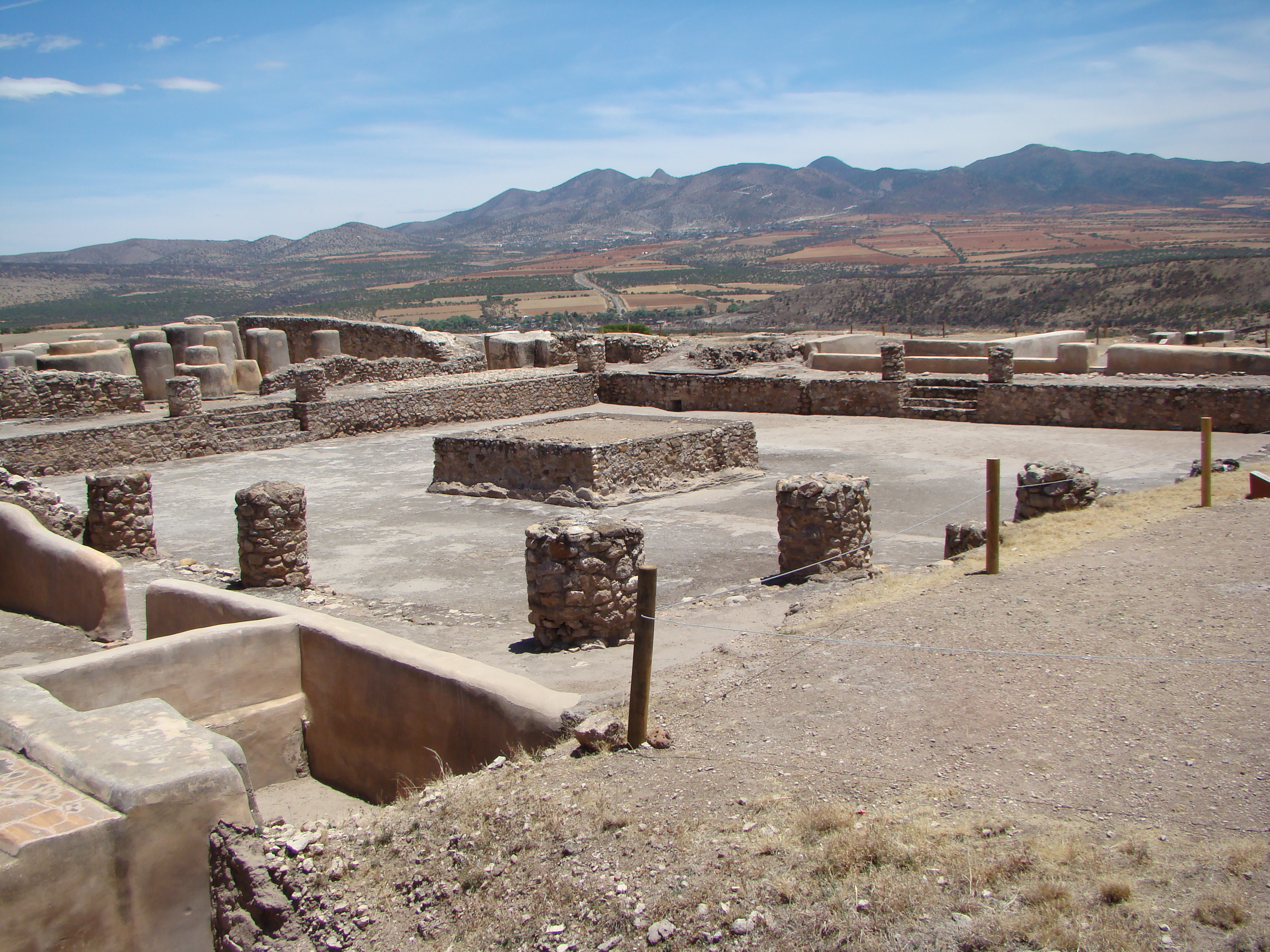
- Altavista archaeological site in Chalchihuites
- Interactive map of Altavista
- 23°28′42″N 103°56′44″W
- Type: Archaeological site
- Cultures: Chalchihuites
- Location: Chalchihuites, Mexico
- Region: Mesoamerica

History
- Built: c. 200 CE
- Abandoned: c. 1500 CE

Altavista, or Chalchihuites, is an archaeological site near the municipality of Chalchihuites in the Mexican state of Zacatecas, in the northwest of Mexico. It is believed that the site was a cultural oasis that was occupied more or less continuously from AD 100 to AD 1400.

The site is within the "Sierra de Chalchihuites" – from the Nahuatl word chalchíhuitl, the name means "precious stone" – where the Chalchihuites-Chichimec culture was established.

The Altavista name is due to a ranch that existed in the vicinity at the time when archaeologist Manuel Gamio visited the area. There are opinions that this ceremonial center was developed by the Súchil branch of the Chalchihuites culture.

The site is related to the Chalchihuites culture that flourished during the Mesoamerican classical period, which had a social and political structure; had a hieroglyphical writing system; and constructed formal cities and ceremonial centers, as they had urbanization techniques, a numbering system, astronomy, and other important knowledge. These people, known as Chalchihuites, found sufficient elements to favor their social, economic and military life, and thus decided to settle here.

Altavista was a control center for the turquoise trade route, originating in the oasis-American mines of New Mexico. Population decayed towards the year 800 CE, following a disastrous dry spell that ruined farming in the Mexican semi desert.

It is thought that the high point of cultural flourishing at Altavista occurred during years the 400 to 650 CE, that is, in the classical period. The Chalchihuites cultural and ceremonial center represents the maximum northern expansion of Mesoamerica.

This culture spread on the corridor of the eastern flanks of the Sierra Madre Occidental, from west of the State of Zacatecas to Durango, between 100 and 1250 CE, approximately. It is considered a border culture or "culture of transition", according to the archaeologist Manuel Gamio classification of Mesoamerican sedentary groups and hunter-gatherer Chichimec groups that inhabited the arid northern plateau.

== Site history ==
In 1908 Manuel Gamio performed the first scientific excavations in northern Mexico. In Alta Vista he explored the zone now known as the Columns Hall and the annexed stairway; he also made preliminary investigations of the "caverns" in the region, which he considered defensive refuges.

The site was not investigated anymore until 1971, when J. Charles Kelley initiated an extensive excavation of the site. The knowledge of the Chalchihuites site and culture that today is available, is due to the 30 years of studies made by Kelley and associates in the region of the Zacatecas and Durango States.

According to Kelley, the Alta Vista ceremonial center was a designed and built between 450-470 CE. It has been demonstrated that it was not randomly drawn and constructed, but based on a precise location and directions from the Chapín hill, which is a plateau located seven kilometers to the southwest of the ceremonial center where two circle-cross petroglyphs were found, resembling those found at Teotihuacan. From those stone-glyphs, during the summer solstice a sun alignment is projected onto a summit that arises in the Colorado River, known as Picacho Mountain. The Peak, as well, is related to the Labyrinth of the archaeological site of Alta Vista.

== The site ==
Alta Vista is located almost on the Tropic of Cancer and is oriented such that the corners of the main structures coincide with the cardinal points axes; this is not very common in Mesoamerica.

The Chalchihuites investigation works of Phil Weigand, found evidence of more than 750 prehispanic mines; probably the Mesoamerican area with greater mining activity. Also, turquoise imported from distant deposits was found; probably originating from the US southwest, over a thousand kilometers north of Chalchihuites.

Per Kelley investigation, during its apogee, Altavista played a role similar to other Classic period Mesoamerican ceremonial centers, but on a key Chichimec area. This meant that economic activities and local trade existed, exchange of resources with foreign groups at the regional level, from mining exploitation and a political control, which for Chalchihuites included construction and maintenance of religious and civic structures from 450 to 850 CE approximately.

Ceremonial centers such as Alta Vista, with its sophisticated characteristics related to the complex Mesoamerican ritual ideology, are important to understand the nature of the ties that Teotihuacán managed to establish in different parts of Mesoamerica. Traders, priests groups and merchants that managed to integrate the incipient regional elites within trade networks and established routes to maintain these activities; they were, probably one of the integrating forces of the classic Mesoamerica.

== Site orientation ==
The archaeological site was built according to the precise location and orientation of two hills, one is Chapín, seven kilometers southeast, where the two circle-cross petroglyphs were found (similar to those in Teotihuacán). From there the sun alignment on the other hill can be seen, Picacho Pelón, aligned with the Altavista labyrinth, (see below) a hallway limited by adobe walls and embedded pilasters. At the end of the corridor is the Observatory, from which the first equinox sun rays peek over the top of the hill.

The perfect orientation of the civic or main plaza towards the four cardinal points evidences the enormous knowledge possessed by these ancient people of the Astral and magnetic poles.

Another construction is the "Columns Hall", it has been confirmed that it is a lunar calendar, which consists of four parallel rows of seven columns, which are equivalent to the 28-day lunar cycle.

The archaeological site is located near the Tropic of Cancer and is believed to be one of the main astronomical observatories in Mesoamerica. Its location allows perfect observation the Sun equinoxes and solstices steps in relation to the Sun rising by surrounding hills: Chapín, Pedregoso and Picacho.

== Structures ==
It is apparent that most of the constructions on this site have not yet been explored.

There are two regular size civic plazas, each has a mound in the Center, it is assumed that these were used for human sacrifices, or for people involved in ceremonies or competition. It is worth mentioning, in the east plaza, has more hierarchical spaces, and it leads to believe that these were reserved for regional representatives of native groups, when events took place.

=== Column Hall ===
This is the earliest site structure. It is an enclosure with a square base that contains vestiges of a quadrangular chamber with 28 columns that were roof support. The space is divided into four parallel rows of seven columns each, with different sizes and shapes. It is inferred that this was a calendar in which the equivalence of the lunar cycle of 28 days is evident. The hall was constructed over a masonry platform, integrated to a patio with a central altar and an elevated perimeter corridor or walkway.

During excavations it was detected that the structure was carefully laid out, using a lay out post system, that served to fix dimensions to the lines of the inferior and outer walls; these posts were kept and covered with stucco.

It is believed that the original building had an open patio in the center and that in time the structure was modified by adding columns to support a complete roofing system. In a later stage, it was filled up to turn it a platform that supported a superior structure, today has disappeared.

=== Gamio Stairway ===
The so-called "Gamio Stairs" were probably an access to the above building. It is noted that several columns seem to have been reinforced; in addition, some reinforcement was added to the outer walls, it is inferred that there were some structural faults in the structure.

A multiple burial was found near the northern lower corner of the structure, including four ceramic vessels as offerings, apparently associated with the four cardinal points. The vessel bodies are decorated with an eagle holding serpents and lightning with its beak and claws. It is inferred that the building was a temple dedicated to the cult of God Tezcatlipoca, the Nocturnal Jaguar God of Northern Skies.

=== Sun Pyramid ===
Investigation work in 1976 by Kelley and his team, determined that this pyramid is the last of three constructive stages. On top they found the remains of a temple with battlements. Inside the pyramid is a crypt that contained remains of three individuals with very elaborated offerings, it is believed that they were priest-governors associated to the solar cult.

=== Skull Temple ===
It is located southwest of the Sun Pyramid, the adobe walls and floors were stuccoed in repeated occasions. A 70 centimeters small entrance is located in the center of the southeastern wall. Two 40 centimeters diameter floor holes were found that are believed to have served as the foundation for two wood posts which held a roof bracket for ceiling support. In the center is a rock furnace with adobe stucco; it measures, approximately, two square meters. A Concentration of disarticulated human bones was found on the floor of this structure, mainly skulls, jaws and long bones, most of the skulls display perforations in the apex, as well as two leg bones with traces of ropes Mecate (rein) tied in the ends. It has been deduced that the skulls and long bones hung from the ceiling and that they could represent trophies or offerings associated to human sacrifice.

This practice of human sacrifice with ritual exhibition appears in the river basin of Mexico in the Postclassical period (900-1519 CE.) as the Tzompantli architectonic element, it suggests a relation between the mountain groups of this northern region with those of the Mexico central plateau.

=== Labyrinth ===
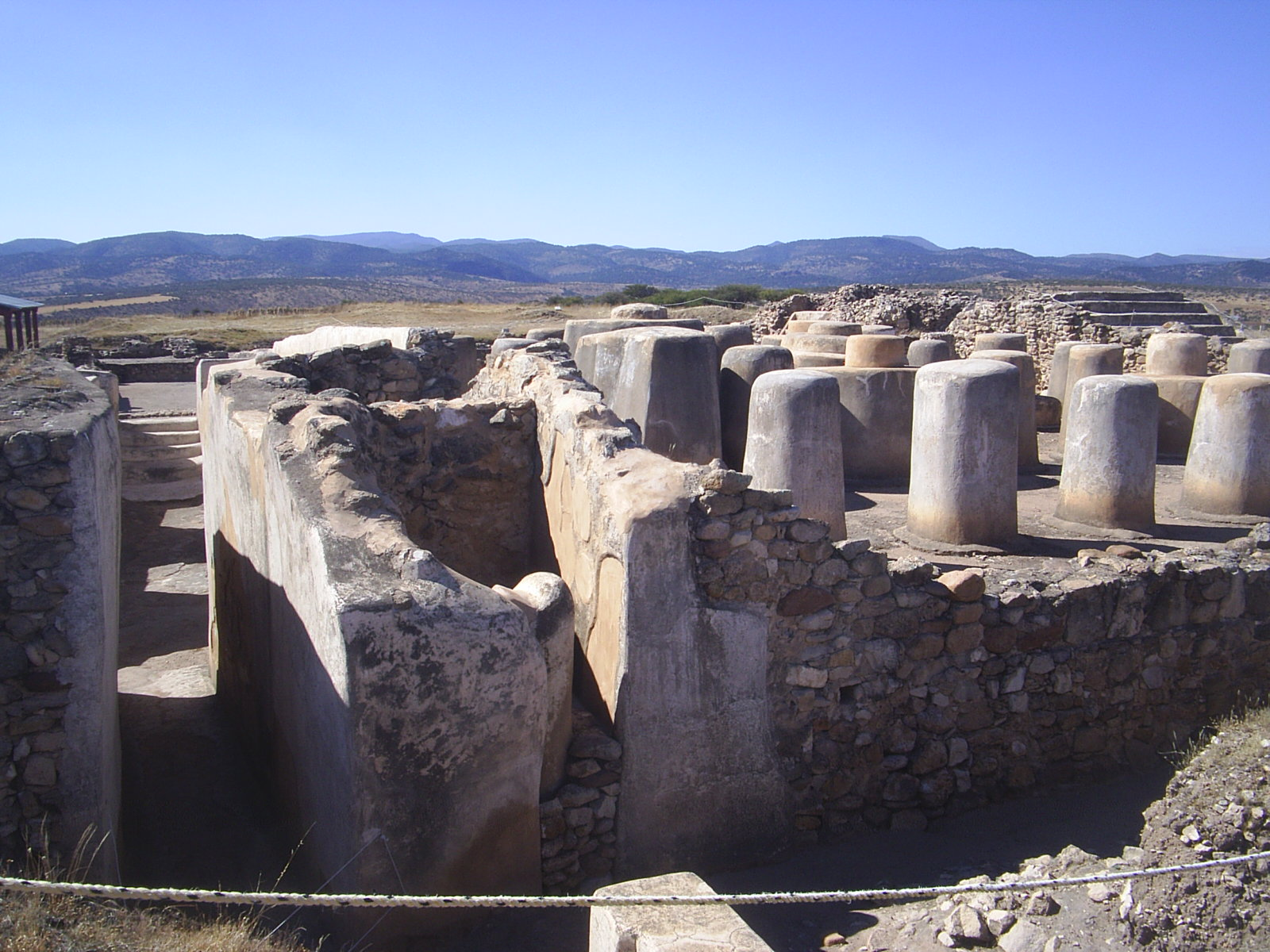
"El Laberinto"

Located next to the Columns Hall. It is a long corridor with masonry walls; it is made up of a series of returns and pillars with diverse angles. More detailed Inspection showed several additions or corrections that were made throughout the corridor. It has been demonstrated that the eastern extension of the corridor and the summit of the Picacho hill are aligned at the raising of the equinoctial sun.

Apparently the sun on the horizon, behind Picacho, illuminates the labyrinth with a direct light beam; hence it is called the "solar path". The precision used to draw up and build this structure is emphasized, so that it could work as a solar calendar instrument. On one side of the labyrinth is a set of rooms, a hall and an atrium, which is identified as the Astronomers Palace.

=== Other structures ===
There are many structures yet to be studied. On a platform southwest of the patio are vestiges of three structures; a central pyramid and small enclosures to both sides.

== Site negligence ==
Chalchihuites population is concerned about the lack of security in the area and safety lacking for the important and valuable collection of archeological pieces housed at the museum.
