= Zacateco =

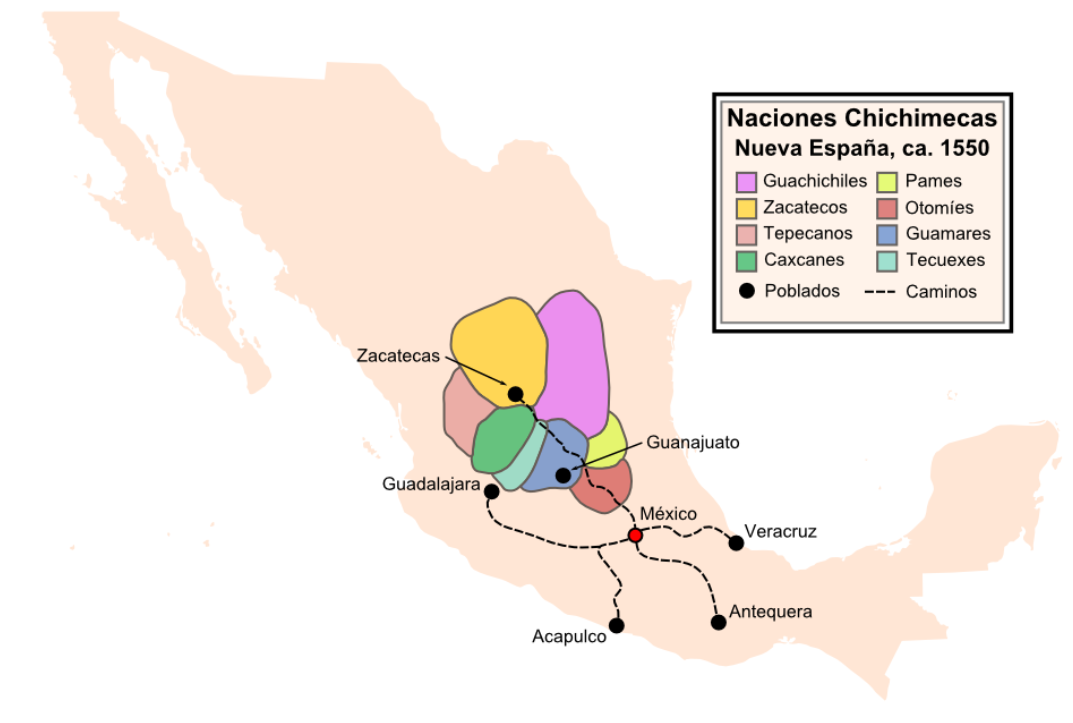
- Map of Zacateco and surrounding nations during the 16th century

Total population
- Unknown

Regions with significant populations
- Mexico (Zacatecas, Durango)

Languages
- Spanish, formerly Zacateco

Religion
- Christianity especially Roman Catholic

Related ethnic groups
- Caxcan, Guachichil, Guamare, Tepehuán, Pame, Tecuexe

The Zacateco (or Zacatecas) are an Indigenous group, one of the peoples called Chichimeca by the Nahua. They live in most of what is now the state of Zacatecas and the northeastern part of Durango. Large concentrations of modern-day descendants reside in Zacatecas and Durango, as well as other large cities of Mexico.

== Name ==
"Zacateco" is a Mexican Spanish derivation from the original Nahuatl Zacatecatl, pluralized in early Mexican Spanish as Zacatecas, the name given to the state and city. The name was given by the Nahua to the people inhabiting a region in which a grass they called the zacatl was abundant. The region was thus called Zacatlan by the Nahua.

== History ==
=== The Chichimeca War ===
The Zacateco united militarily with other Chichimeca nations to form the Chichimeca Confederation to defeat the Spaniards during the Chichimeca War (1550–90).

=== Modern history ===
The Zacateco as a culture has faced violent assimilation by the Mexican state and numerous attempts at mestizaje with Mexican people. However, many of their direct descendants still live in large concentrations in central and Northern Mexico, as well as the US Southwest. Today, it is extremely difficult to even approximate contemporary Zacateco populations. It is equally difficult to elaborate on their culture, language, art, and traditions.

== Geography ==
To the east and north they overlap lands with the Guachichil. They extend to border the Tepehuán to the west near Durango. To the north their land borders that of the Irritila or Laguneros, up to were Cuencamé and Parras are located. Their principal population centers were in Malpaís, around Peñón Blanco, and around the Cerro de la Bufa. They also extend down to what is now Los Altos, Jalisco, and have multiple territorial overlaps with the Caxcan.

== Culture ==
=== Way of life ===
Most Zacateco were mobile, although a few groups were essentially sedentary. Both men and women wore their hair down to their waist. Some Chichimeca tribes wore their head braided, but it is unspecified if any Zacateco tribes did so. They used body paint and tattoos to distinguish themselves from other tribes. Zacateco were known to wear skin coverings below their knees and skin headbands on their foreheads. Occasionally they wore leather-soled sandals. They were "graceful, strong, robust and beardless". Juan Bautista de Pomar commented, "In the opinion of men experienced in foreign lands, the Zacateco are the best archers in the world."

=== Religion ===
The Zacateco were a mobile tribe, and others were sedentary, living mostly in one area. Some tribes did in fact have temples dedicated to worship in the southwestern part of the state of Zacatecas. In a town called El Teul Gonzalez De Ortega there is a hill called El Cerro del Sombrero. And upon this hill there are temples, ball courts, and ancient channels where the tribe extracted fresh water from the hill.

== Impacts of Spanish Colonization on the Zacateco ==
With the war of extermination carried out by the Spanish, the Zacateco and other Chichimeca groups experienced a radical transformation in their way of life. Although initial contact was peaceful, conflict soon arose as Spanish colonial practices disrupted Zacateco cultural systems, particularly regarding Indigenous enslavement, forced displacement, territorial boundaries, and the exploitation of natural resources. The introduction of livestock provoked tensions, and resistance intensified during the Chichimeca War (1550–1600). As a result, many Zacateco abandoned their open encampments and retreated into mountainous regions, shifting toward large, temporary settlements and transforming their earlier mobile lifestyle.

War, slavery, gender violence, and induced famine led to a drastic decline in the Zacateco population. Many were captured and sold into slavery by the Spanish, and some children were sent to Mexico City to be indoctrinated in the Christian faith. Spanish authorities justified their war against the Zacateco by labeling them as "barbarians," emphasizing their nomadic and rebellious nature to legitimize violence and forced servitude.
