= Guamare =

Guamares
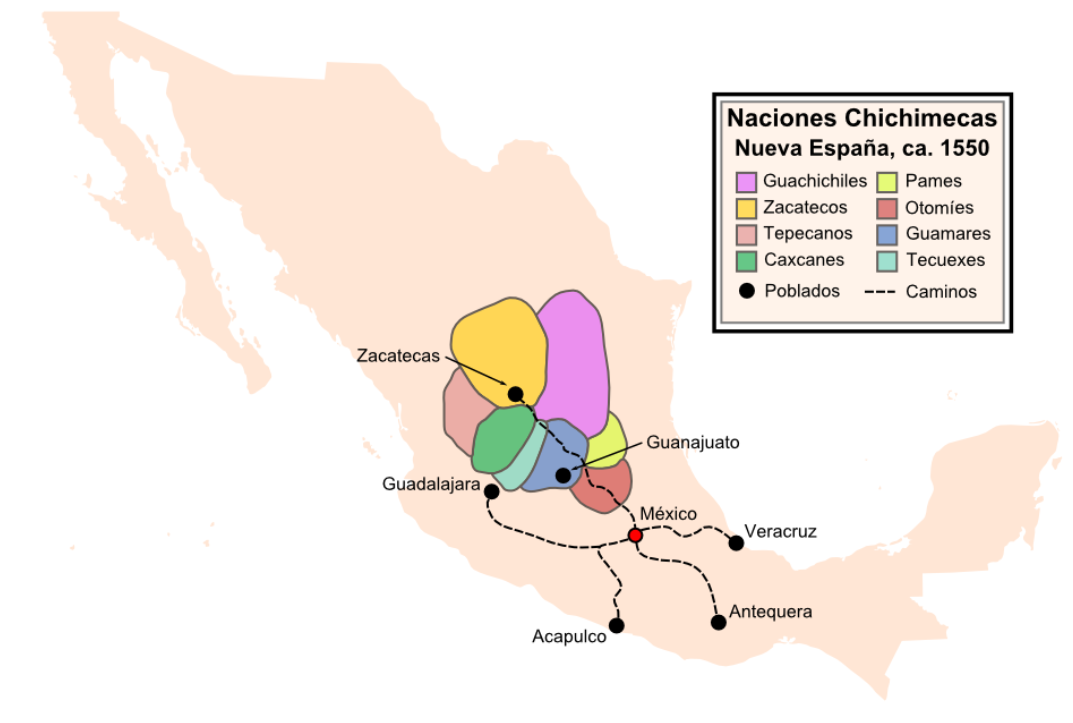
- Map of Chichimeca tribes

Regions with significant populations
- Mexico (Guanajuato)

Languages
- Guamare language (Unclassified)

Religion
- Indigenous Religion

Related ethnic groups
- Other Chichimecas

The Guamare people were an indigenous people of Mexico, who were established mostly in Guanajuato and at the border of Jalisco. They were part of the Chichimecas, a group of a nomadic hunter-gatherer culture and called themselves Children of the Wind, living religiously from the natural land. As a tradition, they would cremate their dead and spread their ashes into the wind back to 'Mother Earth'. The Guamare people were politically united with the Chichimeca Confederation, but like other Chichimeca nations were independent. The Chichimeca were established in the present-day Bajio region of Mexico.

== Territory ==
The Guamares were centered in the Guanajuato Sierras, but some settled as far east as Aguascalientes. The 17th century author Gonzalo de las Casas described the Guamares as "the bravest, most warlike, treacherous and destructive of all the Chichimecas, and the most astute (dispuesta)."

One Guamare group called the "Chichimecas Blancos" lived in the region between Jalostotitlan and Aguascalientes. This branch of the Guamares painted their heads white. However, much like the Guachichiles, many of the Guamares colored their long hair red and painted the body with various colors.

== History ==
From 1550 to 1590, the Guamares along with other Chichimeca groups waged a fierce war against the Spaniards and their Indian allies in a conflict known as the Chichimeca War and in the Mexican War of Independence with a newly assimilated Mexican country. The Spaniards were unable to defeat the Chichimecas, but they offered many goods and previously colonized land for the Chichimecas to make peace.
