= Bufa Hill =

Hill near Zacatecas City in Mexico

Coordinates: 22°46′41″N 102°33′54″W

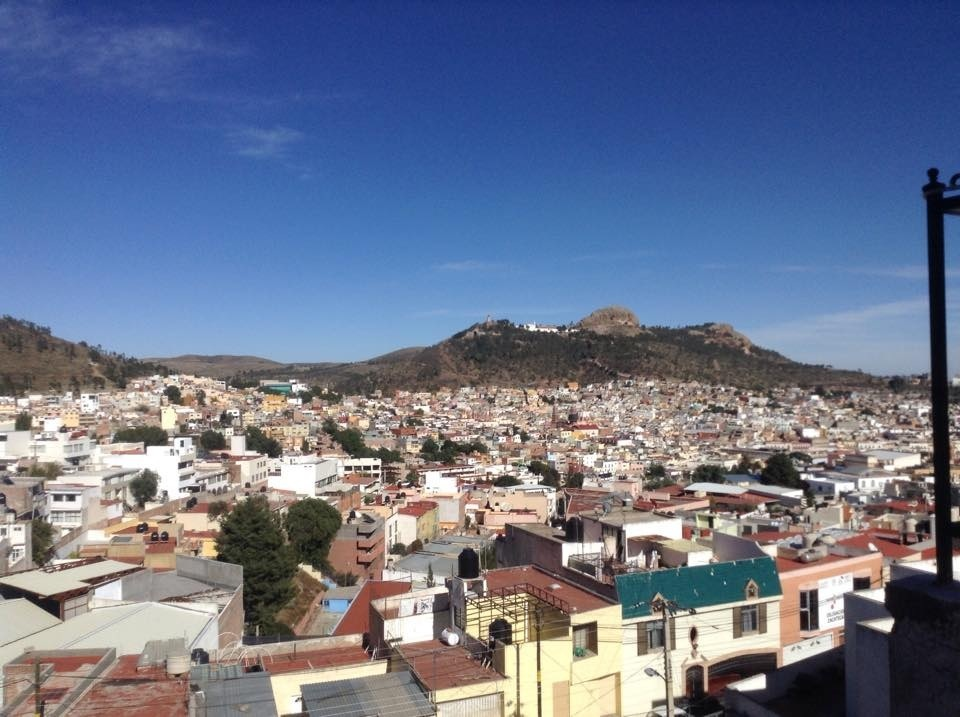
Bufa Hill

Bufa Hill or El Cerro de la Bufa is a hill found east of historic downtown area of the Mexican city of Zacatecas and is of historic and cultural significance in the state of Zacatecas.

== Name ==
The origin of Bufa Hill's name is disputed. What is, perhaps, the best-known version of the tale says that the hill was christened Bufa by Juan de Tolosa. Bufa is a word that originated from Aragonese, meaning pig bladder, which was used to describe the unique shape of the hill.

== History ==
=== Pre-Hispanic period ===
Bufa Hill, which lies to the east of historic downtown Zacatecas, is 2,610 meters above sea level. The mountain served as a home to several Aridoamerican tribes, from whence the city Zacatecas received its name. The Chichimecan tribes that inhabited the Zacatecan area were the Caxcanes, Guachichiles, Guamares Irritilas, Huicholes, Tecuexes, Teules, Tepehuanes, Coras, y Zacatecas. The Zacatecas tribe was considered to be one of the most important. Thus, not only did the city of Zacatecas inherit the tribal name, but so did the state. The Caxcanes occupied a large portion of what now comprises the states of Jalisco and Zacatecas. The Bufa is a tourist attraction that marks the victory of the Battle of Zacatecas, a significant moment in the history of the state.

=== Colonial period ===
The four founding fathers of Zacatecas, a mining city, were Juan de Tolosa, Cristóbal de Oñate, Diego de Ibarra, and Baltazar Temiño de Bañuelos.

When the Spanish, who were searching for precious metals, arrived at what is now Zacatecas, they entered through a mountainous path that led to a valley. Soon, they came across a large mountain which Juan de Tolosa named Bufa Hill.

In the year 1588, Bufa Hill had gained so much importance that it was included in the city's arms, with the support of Felipe II.

Bufa Hill was also important in the arrival of Miguel Hidalgo y Costilla and in the Mexican War of Independence.
