= Guachichil =

Indigenous people in central Mexico

- Map of former Guachichil territory in Mexico

Total population
- Unknown

Regions with significant populations
- Central Mexico (Zacatecas, Guanajuato, San Luis Potosí, Nuevo León, and Coahuila)

Languages
- Guachichil, Spanish

Religion
- Roman Catholic

Related ethnic groups
- Other Chichimecas, possibly Huichol

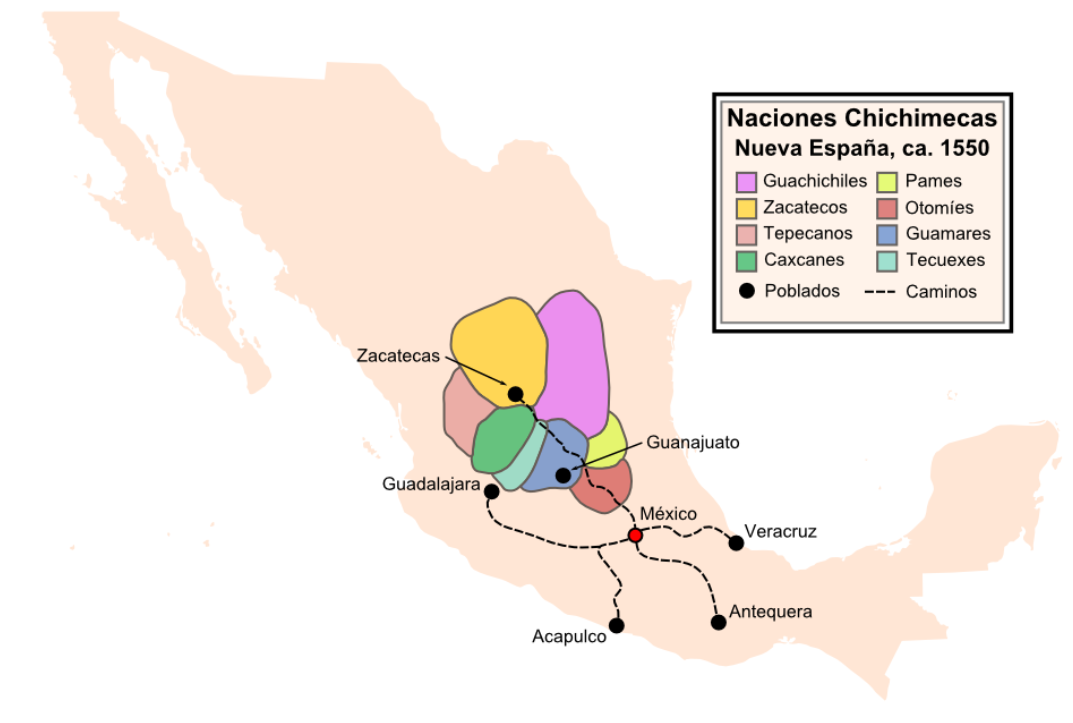
Map of Chichimeca territories Guachichile territory in purple.

The Guachichil, Kwahchichitl, Cuauchichil, or Quauhchichitl are an exonym for an Indigenous people of Mexico. Prior to European contact, they occupied the most extensive territory of all the Indigenous Chichimeca tribes in pre-Columbian central Mexico.

The Guachichiles settled a large region of Zacatecas; as well as portions of San Luis Potosí, Guanajuato, and northeastern Jalisco; south to the northern corners of Michoacán; and north to Saltillo in Coahuila.

== History ==
Considered both warlike and brave, the Guachichiles played a major role in provoking the other Chichimeca tribes to resist the Spanish settlement. The historian Philip Wayne Powell wrote:

"Their strategic position in relation to Spanish mines and highways, made them especially effective in raiding and in escape from Spanish reprisal."

These warriors were known to fight fiercely even if mortally wounded and were a key component in the Spanish defeat during the Chichimeca Wars. The children learned to use the bow at walking age and the hunters were such good shots that if they missed the eye and hit the eyebrow they would be extremely disappointed. The Chichimeca bow and arrow was expertly crafted allowing for penetration of Spanish armor.

Two Spanish accounts of the Chichimeca's archery skill: "On one occasion I saw them throw an orange into the air, and they shot into it so many arrows that, having held it in the air for much time, it finally fell in minute pieces" (Powell 48). "One of don Alonso de Castilla's soldiers had an arrow pass through the head of his horse, including a crownpiece of double buckskin and metal, and into his chest, so he fell with the horse dead on the ground 'this was seen by many who are still living'" (Powell 48).

The Chichimeca were nomadic making them very mobile and experts of the rough vegetation filled (mostly cactus) land in which they always looked for hiding spots. "His long use of the food native to the Gran Chichimeca gave him far greater mobility than the sedentary invader, who was tied to domesticated livestock, agriculture, and imported supplies. The nomad could and did cut off these supplies, destroy the livestock, and thus paralyze the economic and military vitality of the invaders; this was seldom possible in reverse" (Powell 44). They attacked in small groups ranging from five up to two-hundred people.

They highly valued animal furs and highly treasured European scalps. The most valued of those being red hair due to their cultural importance of the color red. The Chichimeca were easily willing to trade seized gold and silver for red haired women as noted by an extremely small percentage of the population in that territory today having brownish-reddish hair, more noticeably when mixed with whites of non-red haired origin. Red haired women and children were a large incentive used to obtain peace within the region.

=== War tactics ===
The Guachichil would outsmart/deceive their adversaries instead of relying on brute force. "He sent spies into Spanish-Indian towns for appraisal of the enemy's plans and strength; he developed a far-flung system of lookouts and scouts (atalays); and, in major attacks, settlements were softened by preliminary and apparently systematic killing and stealing of horses and other livestock, this being an attempt, sometimes successful, to change his intended victim from horseman to foot soldier" (Powell 46). When they attacked they used a very good tactic that terrified the animals and scared the Spanish. The Guachichil would disguise themselves as grotesque animals using animal heads and red paint then yelled like crazed beasts making the Spanish lose control of the livestock. The 50-mile (80-km) mountain range, from currently La Montesa to Milagros, Zacatecas, was known as "El Camino Del Infierno" or "The Path of Hell" by the Spanish. The caravans were required to pass through that 50-mile mountain range because a detour would be very lengthy. Within "The Path of Hell" the most ferocious attacks took place. Ancient Guachichil murals of the region paint the indigenous accounts of these events.

The chieftain of the tribe was also the military leader. The Spaniards observed that they attacked in gangs of few members who differed from the other Chichimecas by painting their heads and hair red.

They attacked their enemies warlike with obsidian swords, spears, darts, and arrows.

They first selected the place of attack, preferably a desert but mountainous plain, a rock, a ravine, a swamp, or they simply waited until it was midnight. At midnight they would stealthily position themselves in the attack zone and suddenly let out loud and terrible howls and screams that perplexed their enemies at the same time that they began the attack by running directly towards the target, at the same time that they produced a shower of arrows.

The political organization of the Guachichiles was very rudimentary when the Spanish arrived. It was patriarchal and consisted of the most powerful warrior who managed to overthrow the chief who ruled at that time would be the chief. If he failed to overthrow the chief, he separated from the tribe with some families and settled elsewhere. Although tribes could also unite and thus become more powerful through inter-tribal marriages. At the arrival of the Spanish there were hundreds of tribes throughout the territory, but four were the most powerful.

=== Colony and conquest ===
The region currently occupied by the city of San Luis Potosí was, until before the arrival of the Spaniards, a Guachichil-Chichimeca post.

Since 1550, Guachichil, Guamares and other Chichimecas assaults began to be registered, so Viceroy Don Luis II de Velasco commissioned Herrera to punish the robbers. Thus began the bloodiest and most extensive of all Spanish companies in America.

Pedro de Anda founded the Real del Cerro de San Pedro and Minas del Potosí on March 4, 1592. Given the lack of water in the place, it was necessary to locate a nearby territory that did have it to support human stay. The place was located east of the Anahuac table.

In order for the Spanish to settle widely, the local Guachichiles and the Tlaxcalans were displaced. The hostility of the Tlaxcalans, backed by the Spanish, against the Guachichiles would not take long to manifest.

The community of San Luis Potosí originated with the well-differentiated gathering of Guachichiles, Tlaxcaltecas, Tarascos, Zacatecos Chichimecas, Chichimecas-Pames de Santa María del Río, Otomí and Spaniards from Extremadura or of uncertain origin.

San Luis Potosí was founded in November 1592 when the Cuachichil leader Moquamalto surrendered to Fray Diego de la Magdalena and Captain Miguel Caldera at the site now known as the Square of the Founders. The city developed around nearby gold mines, attracting settlers from various cities and royal mines. This led to a unique cultural mix, bringing together Guachichiles, Spaniards, Otomi, Tarascos, Mulattoes, Blacks, and Tlaxcalans, creating a distinctive miscegenation in Mexico.

=== Tribes and territories ===
The Guachichiles occupied the entire Potosino Altiplano, part of Guanajuato, Jalisco, Zacatecas and Tamaulipas. This area extended from the south, along the Lerma or Grande river, in Michoacán and Guanajuato, to the Comanja mountain ranges and, on the border with the Rioverde area, the boundary rose to the north. Gonzalo de las Casas observed: "They occupy a lot of land and that is how the most people of all the Chichimecas are and who have done the most damage. There are many partialities and not all are well known." The Guachichiles were not a solid kingdom or political state in the 16th century, but rather a set of tribes and chiefdoms, the Spaniards observed three groups: those of Mazapil (where the Mazapiles predominated) to the north, in the mountains that border the town from Parras, from Las Salinas, to the center of San Luis Potosí and finally from Tunal Grande (where the Xales predominated), where the largest food supply place for the Guachichiles was located; These three groups were not political or cultural units, they were the inhabitants of the three geographical areas where the Guachichiles were centralized. Regardless of the three groups of guachichiles, there were a large number of tribal groups, many of them only mentioned once by the Spaniards: Bózalos or negritos, Macolias, Samúes, Maticoyas, Alaquines, Capiojes, Machipaniquanes, Leemagues, Mascorros, Caisanes, Coyotes, Guanchenis, Uaxabanes, Guenacapiles, Alpañales, Pisones, Cauicuiles, Alacazauis, Guazancores and los Chanales.

== Origin of name ==
The Guachichiles were known to paint their bodies, hair, and faces in red dye. For this reason they were called "guachichile" by the Mexica; from the nahuatl kua-itl (head) and chichil-tic (red), meaning "heads painted red".

== Language ==
The Guachichil language is almost unknown, with only two words and some placenames attested. However, it has been classified by Wick R. Miller as a member of the Corachol subgroup of the Uto-Aztecan languages.

== See also ==
- Indigenous peoples of Mexico
- Pre-Columbian cultures of Mexico

== Sources ==
- Rosales, Rosa H. Yáñez (2017-06-17). "Nahuatl L2 texts from Northern Nueva Galicia". Language Contact and Change in Mesoamerica and Beyond. Studies in Language Companion Series. Vol. 185. Amsterdam: John Benjamins Publishing Company. pp. 237–261. doi:10.1075/slcs.185.12ros. ISBN 978-90-272-5950-9. ISSN 0165-7763.
- Miller, Wick R. (1983). "A Note on Extinct Languages of Northwest Mexico of Supposed Uto-Aztecan Affiliation". International Journal of American Linguistics. 49 (3). University of Chicago Press: 328–334. doi:10.1086/465793. ISSN 0020-7071.
- Gursky, Karl-Heinz (1966). "On the Historical Position of Waikuri". International Journal of American Linguistics. 32 (1): 41–45. doi:10.1086/464877.
- Martínez Sánchez, Lucas (2019). Guachichiles y Franciscanos: en el libro más antiguo del convento de Charcas, 1586 - 1663 (PDF) (in Spanish). Saltillo: Consejo Editorial.
