= La Gran Chichimeca =

Term used by Spanish conquistadores for the Central Mexican Plateau

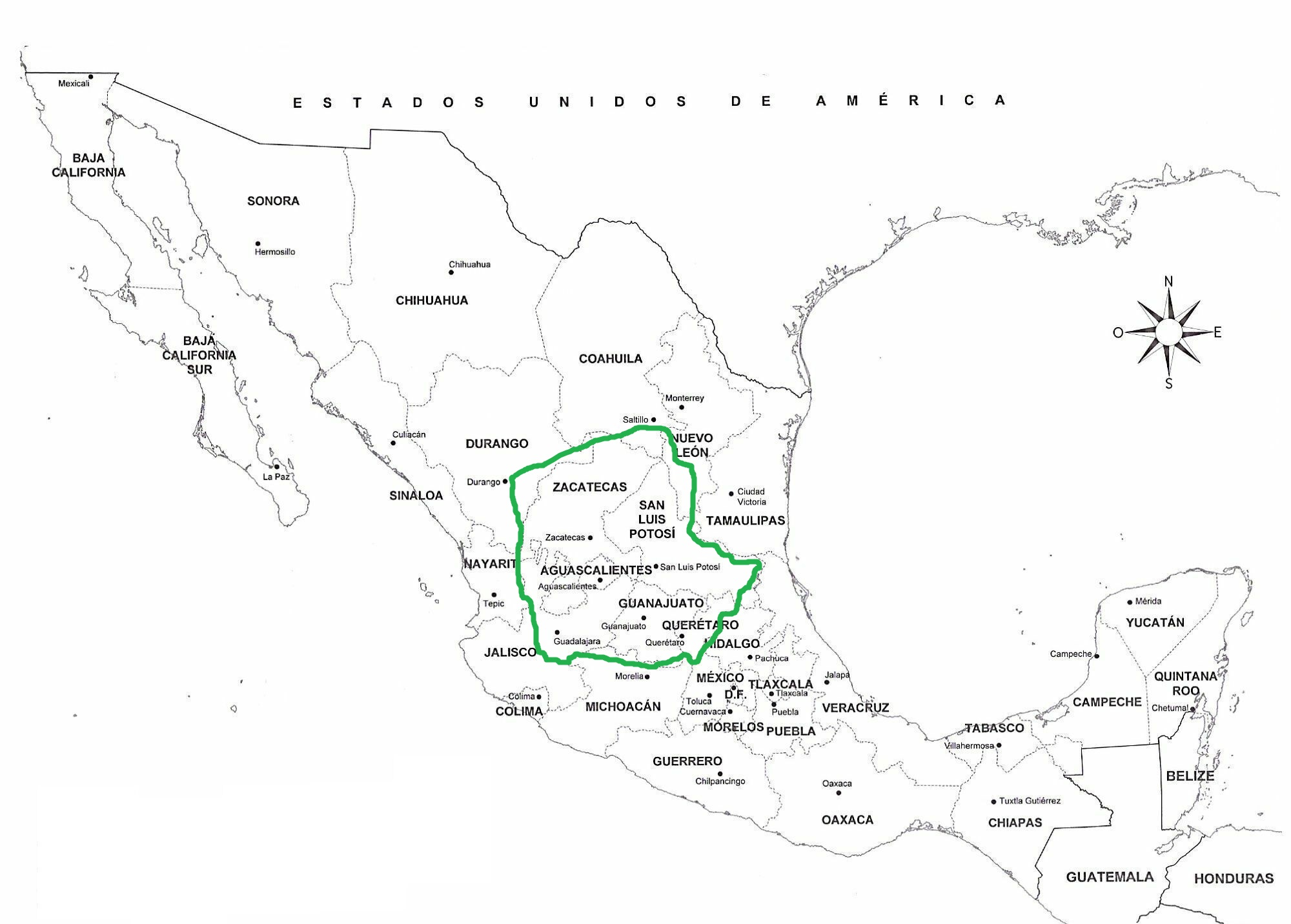
Area of the Gran Chichimeca on a map

La Gran Chichimeca was a term used by the Spanish conquistadores of the 16th century to refer to an area of the northern central Mexican altiplano (plateau), a territory which today is encompassed by the modern Mexican states of Jalisco, Aguascalientes, Nayarit, Guanajuato, Queretaro, and Zacatecas. They derived the term from the Aztec who referred to the nomadic tribes of the area as “chichimeca”.

The Nahuatl name Chīchīmēcah (plural, pronounced [tʃiːtʃiːˈmeːkaʔ]; singular Chīchīmēcatl) means "inhabitants of Chichiman"; the placename Chichiman itself means "Area of Milk". It is sometimes said to be related to chichi "dog", but the i's in chichi are short while those in Chīchīmēcah are long, a phonemic distinction in Nahuatl. The word could either have a negative "barbarous" sense, or a positive "noble savage" sense.

Seventy years after the 1521 fall of the Aztec capital, Tenochtitlan (present-day Mexico City), the Spaniards had failed to subdue the north of New Spain, La Gran Chichimeca. This meant they were unable to exploit the rich silver deposits in the region. The Spanish, who were unable to defeat the Chichimecas militarily, were forced to make "peace by purchase" by offering them land, farming tools and other goods in exchange for peace. (See Chichimeca War)

During the 1920s and 1930s archaeologists, anthropologists, and cultural geographers began to devise the boundaries of what was thought to be Mesoamerica, the Southwest, and the area between known as the La Gran Chichimeca. Based upon language groups, iconography, trade items, and re-examinations of Mesoamerican architecture, the boundaries have moved around over the years as a result of new evidence. Adding to this confusion not all researchers agree the specifics of the boundaries. However, the participation of the cultures of La Gran Chichimeca in overall Mesoamerican traditions, even if peripherally and occasionally, has led a number of researchers to include the region in the overall Mesoamerican framework.
