= Cuitzeo =

Cuitzeo Cuitzeo del Porvenir
- Municipality
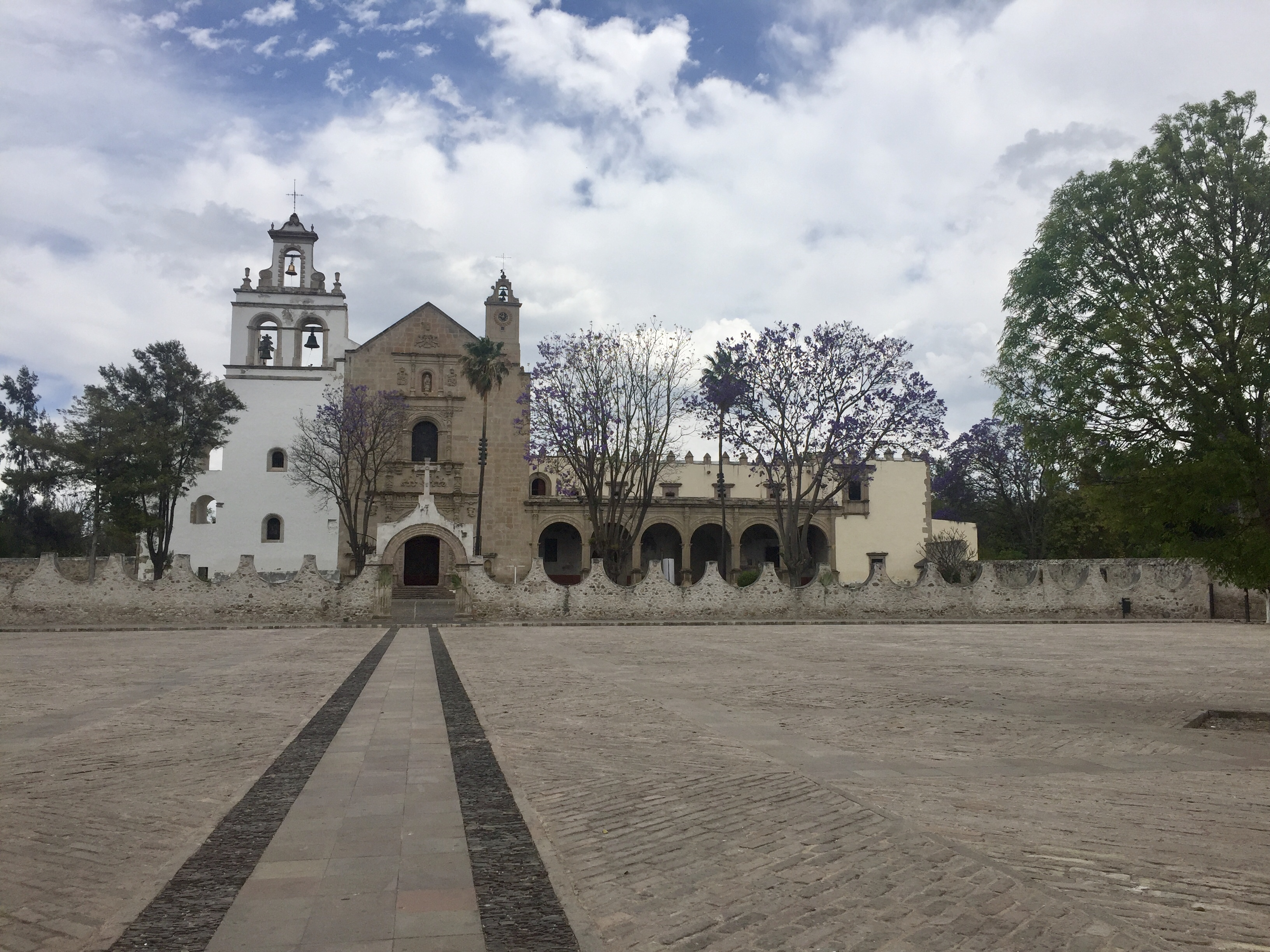
- Church and former monastery of Santa María Magdalena

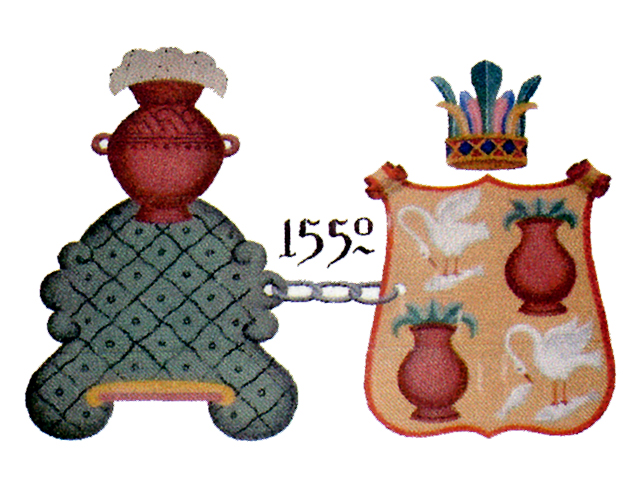
- Seal Coat of arms
- Interactive map of Cuitzeo
- Coordinates: 19°58′07″N 101°08′22″W
- Country: Mexico
- State: Michoacán
- Municipal Seat: Cuitzeo del Porvenir
- Town Founded: 1550
- Municipality Founded: 1825

Government
  - Municipal President: Rosalia Milan Pintor

Population (2020)Municipality
  - Municipality: 29,910
- Time zone: UTC-6 (Central (US Central))
- Postal code: 58840
- Website: Official site

Cuitzeo (Spanish: [kwiˈtseo]) is a municipality located in the north of the Mexican state of Michoacán. The municipal seat is the town of Cuitzeo del Porvenir It is located in a relatively flat depression around Lake Cuitzeo, a large, very shallow lake, which is in danger of disappearing. The town was officially founded in 1550, with the founding of a large Augustinian monastery, which still stands. Today, the town is the seat of a rural municipality, providing local government to surrounding communities.

== The Town of Cuitzeo del Porvenir ==
The town of Cuitzeo is located just over thirty km north of Morelia, on the north shore of Lake Cuitzeo. It is a quiet, rural town, with narrow streets and buildings of white facades with thatched or tile roofs. The streets are mostly traveled by people and pack animals and most of the ambient noise comes from birds in overhead trees, especially in the main plaza. Its main activities are agriculture, livestock, commerce and fishing with a population of 8,760 (2010).

The main structure in the town is the former Santa María Magdalena monastery complex located to one side of the main plaza. The complex consists of a church, cloister, garden and open chapel. Its main attraction is its Plateresque facade, with carvings of Spanish royal arms, Christian symbolism, Augustinian insignia and indigenous imagery, reflecting that the monastery was one of the most sumptuous of its time. Its style is influenced that the church front at Acolman, but it is larger and more imposing. The design and carving of the façade is attributed to a Purépecha craftsman named Juan Metl, whose signature is found inscribed on an ornamental plaque beside the main entrance. It is the only example of this from early colonial Mexico. Another important aspect of the exterior is the open chapel, which is elaborately framed, located behind the portería of the monastery complex. It contains a well preserved 16th century fresco of the Last Judgment and a 17th-century mural of a crucified friar, which may be Antonio de Roa.

The monastery was founded by the Augustinians, with construction started in 1550 over the ruins of a former Purépecha temple to the sun god Curicaueri, using stone from the old building. The structure served as a headquarters for the order and a school.

In 1865, it was used as a military fort. In 1965, the Instituto Nacional de Antropología e Historia took control of the structure, and In 1974, a graphic arts museum (Museo de la Estampa) was opened, renovating the refectory and other living quarters. The museum contains a permanent collection from over forty artists including Leopoldo Méndez and Alfredo Zalce. There are also halls and passageways dedicated to Purépecha archeology and religious items from the colonial era. The upper floor of the cloister contains the Sala Capitular, which houses the monastery library with over 1,100 volumes, mostly from the 18th and 19th centuries.

Another important structure is the former Franciscan hospital which dates from the 18th century, as well as the Santa Magdalena Church, the Concepción Church, the San Pablo Church, the Calvario Church and the Virgin of Guadalupe Sanctuary. These churches have sculptures and paintings that date from the colonial period as far back as the 16th century.

In 2006, the town was named a "Pueblo Mágico."

== The Municipality ==
The town of Cuitzeo del Porvenir is the municipal seat for a number of other communities within the municipality, which together cover a territory of 257.87 km^{2} (99.56 sq mi). The municipality borders those of Santa Ana Maya, Alvaro Obregon, Tarímbaro, Huandacareo and Copándaro with the state of Guanajuato to the north and east. The municipal government consists of a Municipal President, a syndic and 7 representatives called "regidors."

Outside of the seat, other important communities include Cuaracurio (pop. 1,656), San Agustín del Pulque (2,924), Mariano Escobedo (2,859), Cuamio (2,353), Dr. Miguel Silva (1, 021) and Jeruco (960) (2010 figures).

Important landmarks include the Tres Cerritos archeological sites where burial chambers for adults and children have been excavated. It was a ceremonial center which dates back to about 600 CE. Another site is Manuna Hill, on the northwest shore. A number of communities have important churches such as the Chapel of the Child Jesus and the Parish of Saint Mark in the community of Cuamio, the San Juan Bautista Church in Jeruco and the San Agustín Church in San Agustín del Pulque.

== Population ==
According to the results of the 2020 Population and Housing Census carried out by the Instituto Nacional de Estadística y Geografía (INEGI), The town of Cuitzeo del Porvenir had a total of 10,983 inhabitants until that year; Of this figure, 5,254 were Men and 5,729 were Women.

== Geography ==
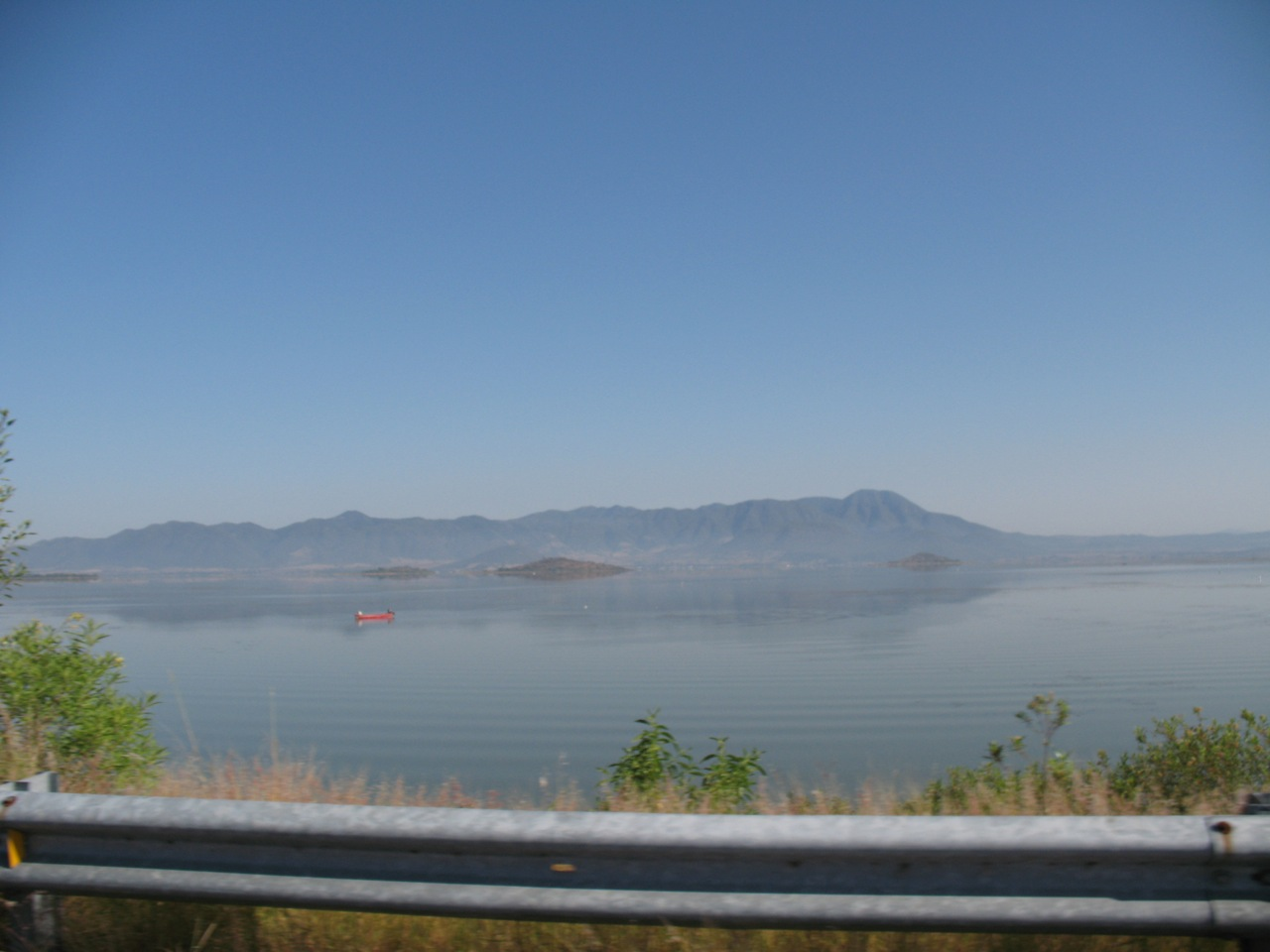
View of Lake Cuitzeo

The town/municipality is located in the north of the state of Michoacán, in the Cuitzeo Depression, with only small hills such as the Manuna and Melón.

=== Hydrography ===
Its hydrography is centered on Lake Cuitzeo with some seasonal streams and thermal springs such as the San Agustín del Maíz. It is a large, very shallow lake fed by fresh water springs. It is home to over ninety pieces of aquatic and semi-aquatic plants, and produces silversides, catfish and carp. In the winter swallows and ducks spend the winter here, migrating from Canada and the United States. The lake is in danger of disappearing.

That which is not lake is primarily grasslands with some opuntia, huisache (Acacia) and other arid plants. Wildlife includes coyotes, raccoons, armadillos, and fish. There are some stands of pine trees.

=== Climate ===
The climate is temperate with rains in the summer. Average annual rainfall is 906.2 ml with temperatures varying between 10.2 and 27.5C.

== History ==
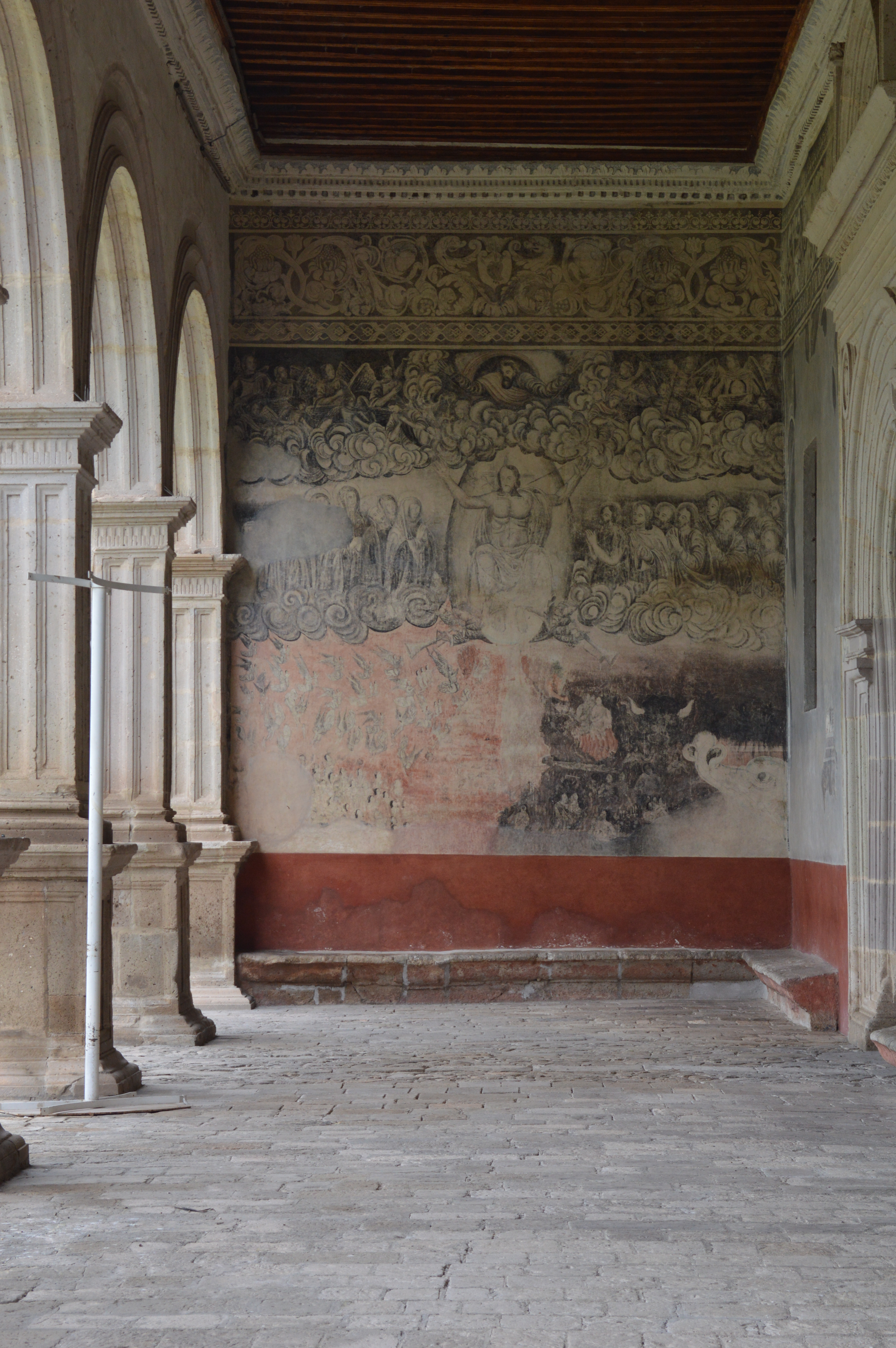
16th century fresco of the Last Judgment at the monastery's open chapel

The name derives from the Purépecha "cuiseo" which means place of water containers. The current spelling dates to the 16th century. During the pre Hispanic period, the area was influenced by several cultures including those of Chupícuaro, Teotihuacán and Tula. By the end of that era, it was under the control of the Purépecha Empire.

At the beginning of the colonial period, in 1528, the area was assigned as an encomienda to Gonzalo López, but by 1547, it has become a semi-autonomous "Republic of Indians." Evangelization was first carried out by the Augustinians under Francisco de Villafuerte and Miguel de Alvarado, who began construction of the Santa María Magdalena monastery in 1550. This is considered the founding of the modern town.

The 19th century is marked by political changes. In 1825, it was part of the "Departamento Norte" and in 1831, it became a municipality as part of the Puruándiro district. In 1861 it is officially named the seat of the current municipality with the name of Cuitzeo del Porvenir. Liberal forces took the town on April 7, 1865 during the Reform War. In 1870, Santa Ana Maya separated from Cuitzeo to form a new municipality.

The 20th century began with the town sacked during the Mexican Revolution by a band of highway robbers under Inés Chávez García. In 1919, Huandacareo separated to form a new municipality. In 1950, Copándaro did the same. Running water was installed in 1955 and electricity in 1964. In 1975, all of the facades of the town were renovated.

== Socioeconomics and culture ==
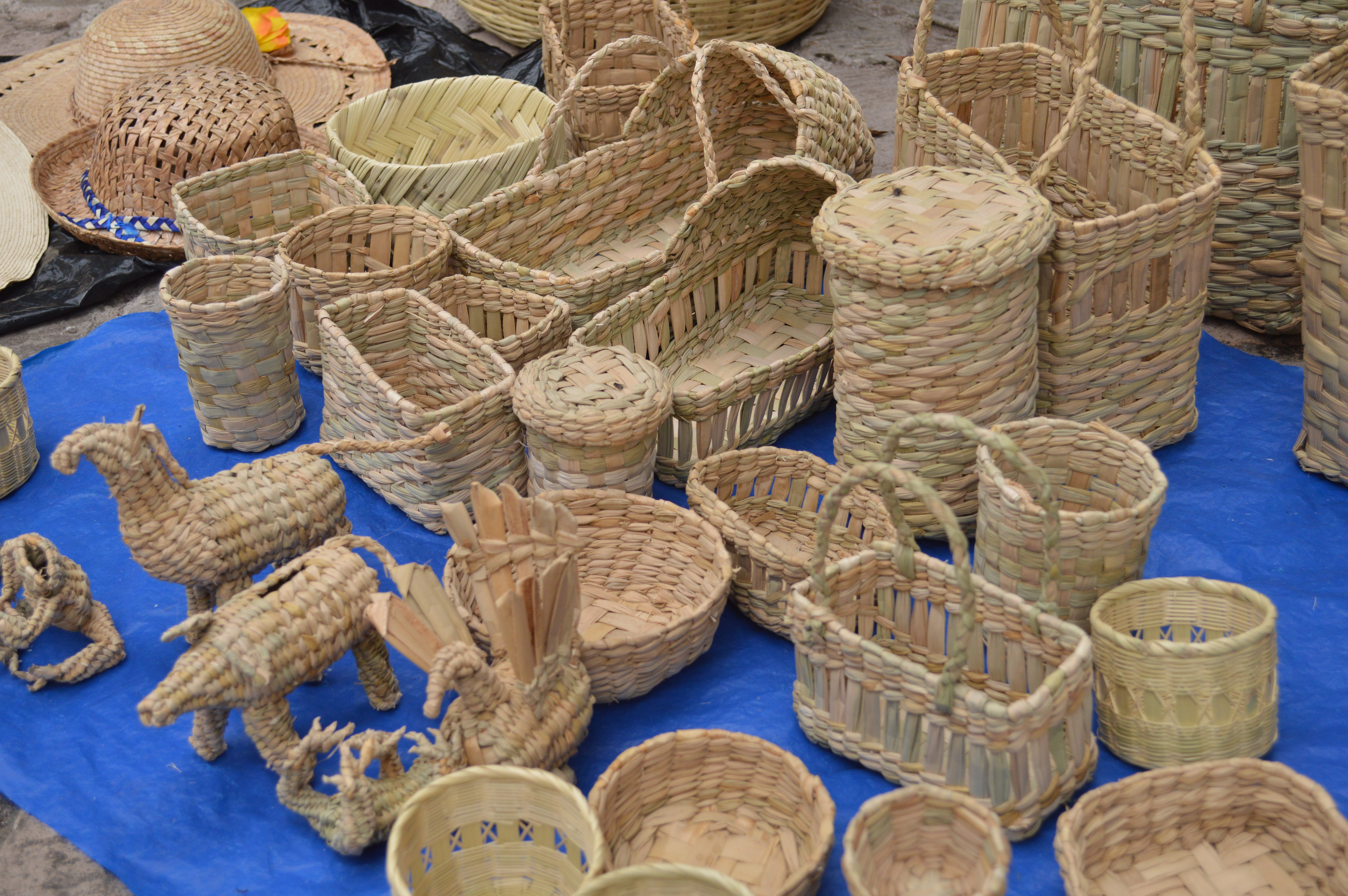
Basketry items for sale in the center of Cuitzeo

The main economic activities of the municipality are agriculture, livestock, commerce and fishing. The most common handcraft is baskets and other items made with various types of vegetable fiber, including floor mats, and hats, using reeds and other plants from the lake. They are generally available for sale in the Cuitzeo town center.

Major festivals include the feasts of the Virgin of the Conception in February and that of the patron saint of Mary Magdalene in July. There is also a secular event commemorating the arrival of Spanish culture in October. Other celebrations include the Fiesta del Buen Temporal in September and an annual festival as the Cerrito Temple in November.

Traditional dishes include corundas, tamales, uchepos, esquites, along with silversides fish charales, from the lake prepared in various ways. The most traditional drinks are pulque and atole.

== Sister Cities ==
- Sopó, Colombia (2016)
