= Huandacareo, Michoacán =

Huandacareo
- Municipality
- Huandacareo
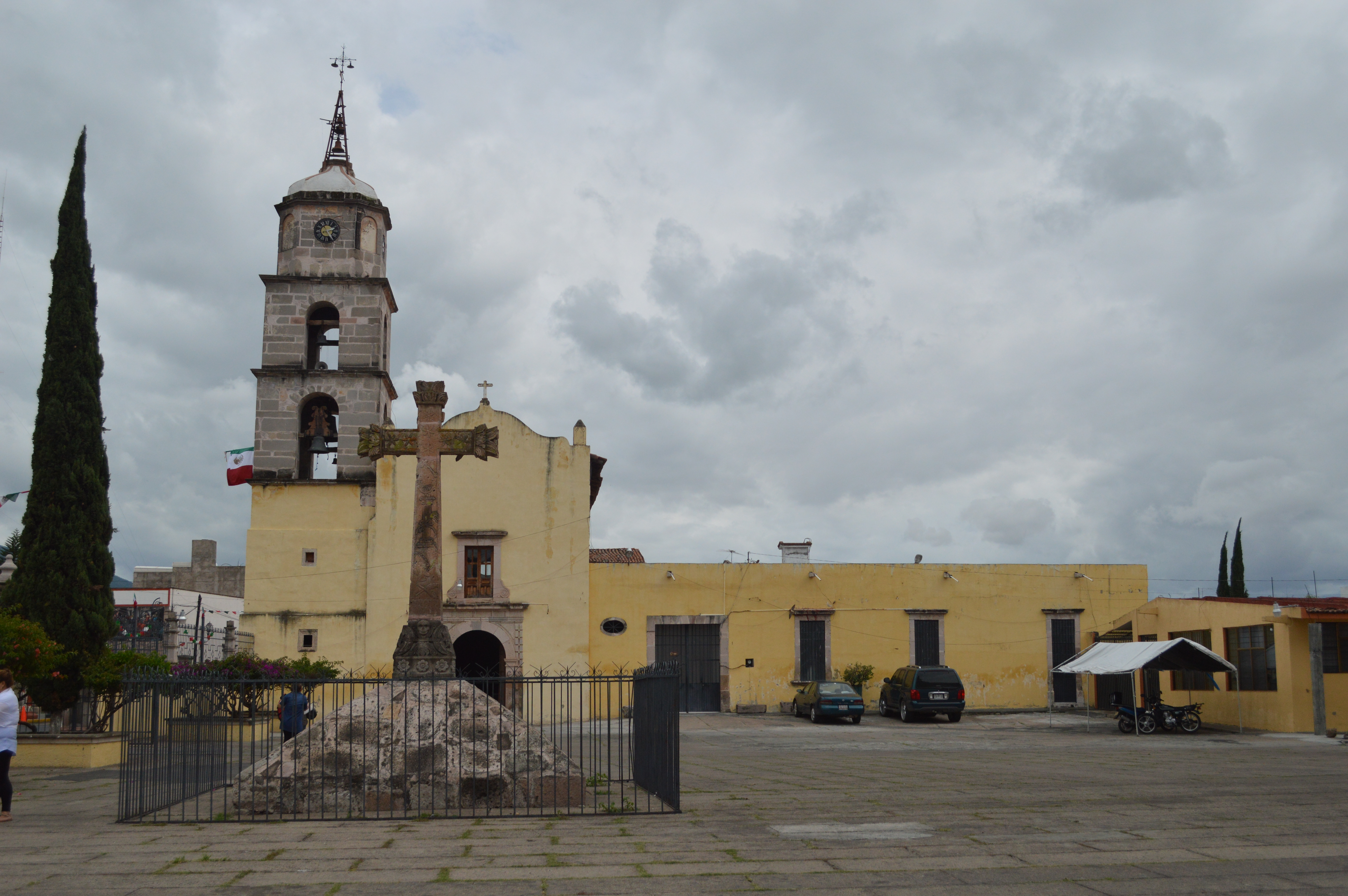
- Parish of San Jerónimo in the town center

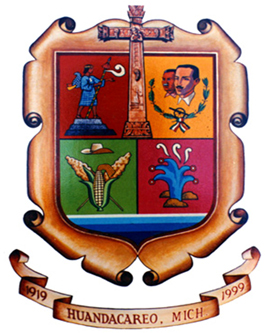
- Coat of arms
- Interactive map of Huandacareo
- Coordinates: 19°59′26″N 101°16′30″W
- Country: Mexico
- State: Michoacán
- Municipal Seat: Huandacareo
- Municipality Founded: 1919

Government
  - Municipal President actualmente 2025*: Alexis Velázquez

Area
  - Municipality: 95.11 km^{2} (36.72 sq mi)

Population (2010)Municipality
  - Municipality: 11,592
  - Seat: 6,736
- Time zone: UTC-6 (Central (US Central))

Huandacareo is a municipality in the north of the Mexican state of Michoacán, on the northwest side of Lake Cuitzeo. The municipal seat is the town of Huandacareo. It is a small rural community located 48 km north of the state capital of Morelia. The area was part of the Tarascan state during the pre Hispanic period, then came under the control of the Augustinians. It was part of the territory of neighboring Cuitzeo until 1919, when it became an independent municipality. Its economic base from the colonial period to the present has been agriculture, growing corn, other crops, pigs and domestic fowl. There is also some tourism, mostly to the municipality's two archeological sites and its colonial churches. Ahí venden unas carnitas bien buenas en el centro gastronómico (las mejores de todo Michoacán) ATJ.

== The town ==
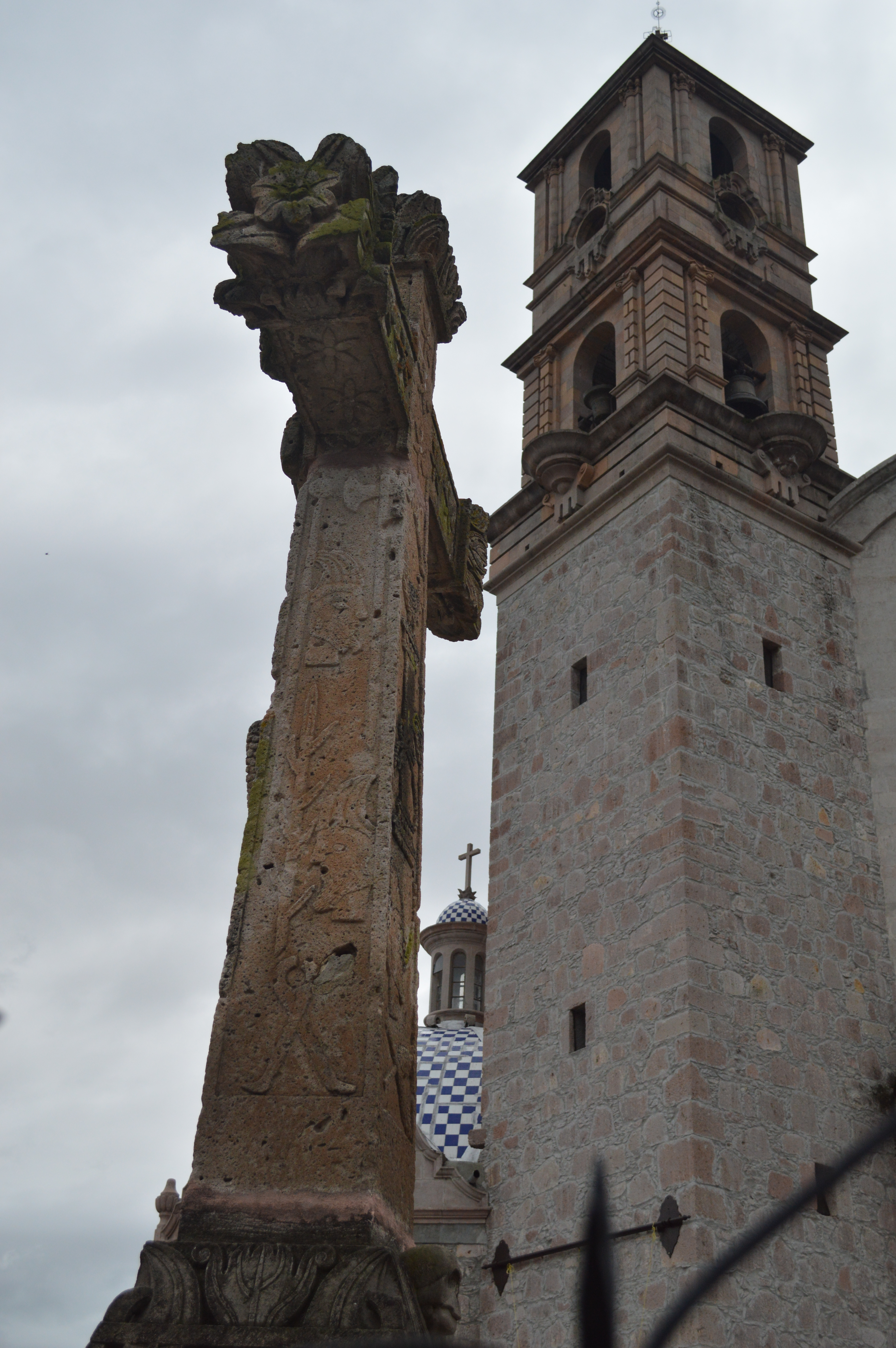
Atrium cross and tower of the Señor de Amparo church

The town of Huandacareo is a small rural community on the northwest side of Lake Cuitzeo. Although rural is it only 48 km from the state capital of Morelia and close to other, larger communities such as Cuitzeo and Chucándiro.

The town itself is oriented east-west, centered on a main plaza. On the west side of the plaza is the San Jeronimo parish church, a rustic structure which was extensively renovated in the late 20th century. Its atrium contains a large atrium cross which was sculpted by indigenous hands in the colonial period, possibly those who created the atrium cross at the nearby church in Capacho, with its flower motifs and depiction of arms. On the north side of the plaza is a church where they venerate a Christ figure called the Señor del Amparo, made from joined corn stalks.

On January 8, the town celebrated the defeat of the band of highway robber Inés Chávez García, who tried to sack the town during the Mexican Revolution. It is celebrated with fireworks, amusement rides, food, music and more. The town's patron saint, Saint Jerome, is celebrated in September. Beginning on the 28th, a dance is held all night. The following day, the image of the saint is carried in procession to nearby communities such as Tupátaro, Tupatarillo and San José Cuaro, before being returned to Arroyo Blanco to be housed in its chapel. This is then followed by a novena, or nine days of prayer.

The seat's main economic activities are tourism, agriculture and livestock.

== The municipality ==
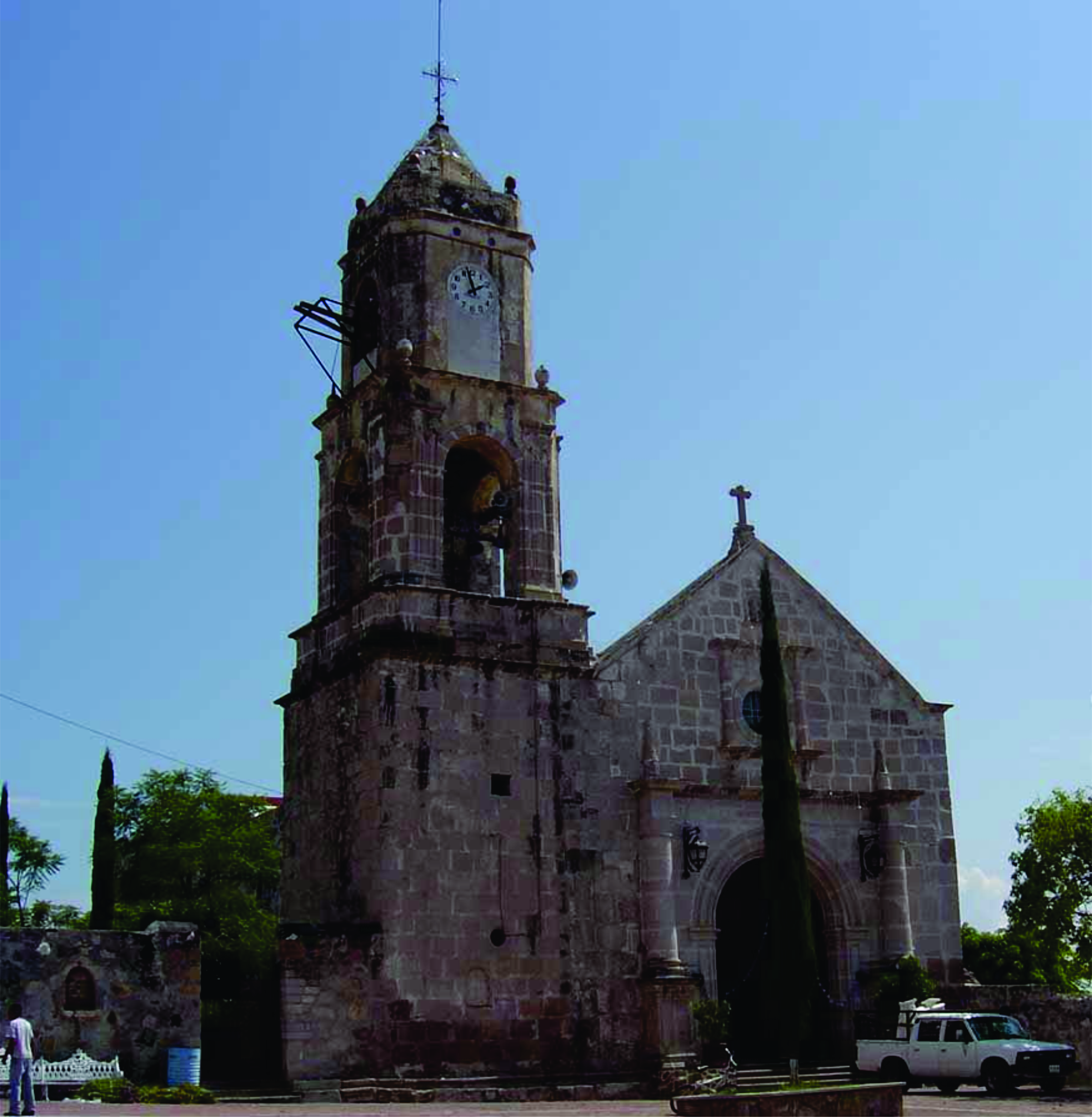
Señor de la Expiración in Capacho

The town of Huandacareo is the local government for eleven other communities, which together cover a territory of 95.11 km^{2} (36.72 sq mi). The municipality borders those of Cuitzeo, Chucándiro, Copándaro and Morelos and to the state of Guanajuato to the north. The municipal government consists of a municipal president, a syndic, and seven representatives called regidors.

There are eleven communities, Capacho, San Cristóbal, San José Cuaro, La Estancia, Tupatarillo, Tupátaro, Los Recodos, Agua Caliente, Agua Caliente (Balenario), El Pescadito, La Granja. Capacho has a population of 1,966 with main economic activities of fishing, handcrafts and fish farming. Capacho has a Baroque influenced church called the Señor de la Expiración, with a large atrium cross, with contains images of the Virgin of Sorrows and symbols related to the Passion of Christ . San José Cuaro has a population of 1,413 and its main economic activity is fish farming.

Although rural, the municipality has a low grade of socioeconomic marginalization, with less than nine percent living in extreme poverty. Ninety five percent of the municipality's roads are paved with the exceptions in very rural areas. The main road in the municipality is 8 de enero, which connects Huandacaro with Villa Morelos, Puruándiro, Chucándiro and Cuitzeo. The main economic staples are still agriculture along with some tourism and industry. Agriculture includes the raising of corn, alfalfa, chickpeas and garlic, along with pigs and domestic fowl. Industry mostly consists of food processing and plants that make pig feed. Traditional handcrafts include items woven from cotton, basketry and palm frond hats. About eighty percent of the municipality's homes had workshops in the 1990s. Today that number has fallen, but each community still has four or five. Tourist attractions include the La Nopalera side, thermal springs, the Augustinian church and the atrium crosses.

La Nopalera is an archeological site in process of being excavated. It is to north of the seat, a small archeological site which was a ceremonial center. This site was at its height in the 12th century although still in use when the Spanish arrived. The site still contains the remains of pre Hispanic construction as well as burials. Huandacareo is a ceremonial site which dates back to 1200 CE. It was still in use when the Spanish arrived in 1536. The site contains walls built to terrace low hills to form walkways and plazas, giving it a fortress like appearance. There are also isolated artifacts such as petroglyphs to be found in the building stone of various constructions.

Most of the municipality holds passion plays and processions during Holy Week with some extending the observance to include “Viernes de Dolores” or the Friday before Palm Sunday .

Traditional foods of the municipality include carnitas, mole, barbacoa and tamales filled with beans.

== History ==
The name Huandacareo is probably of Chichimeca origin with the meaning of area of discourse. According to tradition, the name of the area is from an event related to Cazonci, one of the leaders of the Purépecha Empire. Upon returning victorious from battling incursion in the Yuriruia-Púndaro region, the army stopped on this side of Lake Cuitzeo. During the celebrations that followed, the leader was honored with various discourses or speeches, praising him.

In the pre Hispanic era, the first culture to have influence there was that of Chupícuaro, one of the oldest in the region, with some influence from Teotihuacan. By the end of the pre Hispanic period, it was under the control of the Purépecha State.

After the Spanish conquest, the evangelization process came under the Augustinians, who made this area a hacienda, which absorbed all the local indigenous labor. During the colonial period, this area was part of Cuitzeo, producing corn, wheat and vegetables.

By the end of the 18th century, the population had grown sufficiently to have its own parish church. During the War of Mexican Independence, it was sacked for foodstuffs.

During the 19th century, the area remained a hacienda under the control of the Augustinians, producing corn, cochinilla (Dactylopius coccus) and onions. The area sided with the conservatives during the Reform War because of the power of the Cuitzeo monastery here. However, this power was broken when the Liberals won, and the hacienda moved into secular hands.

In 1918, the local militia avoided the sacking of the town by highway robber José Inés Chávez Garcia.

It remained a territory of Cuitzeo until 1919, when it separated and made its own municipality.

== Geography ==
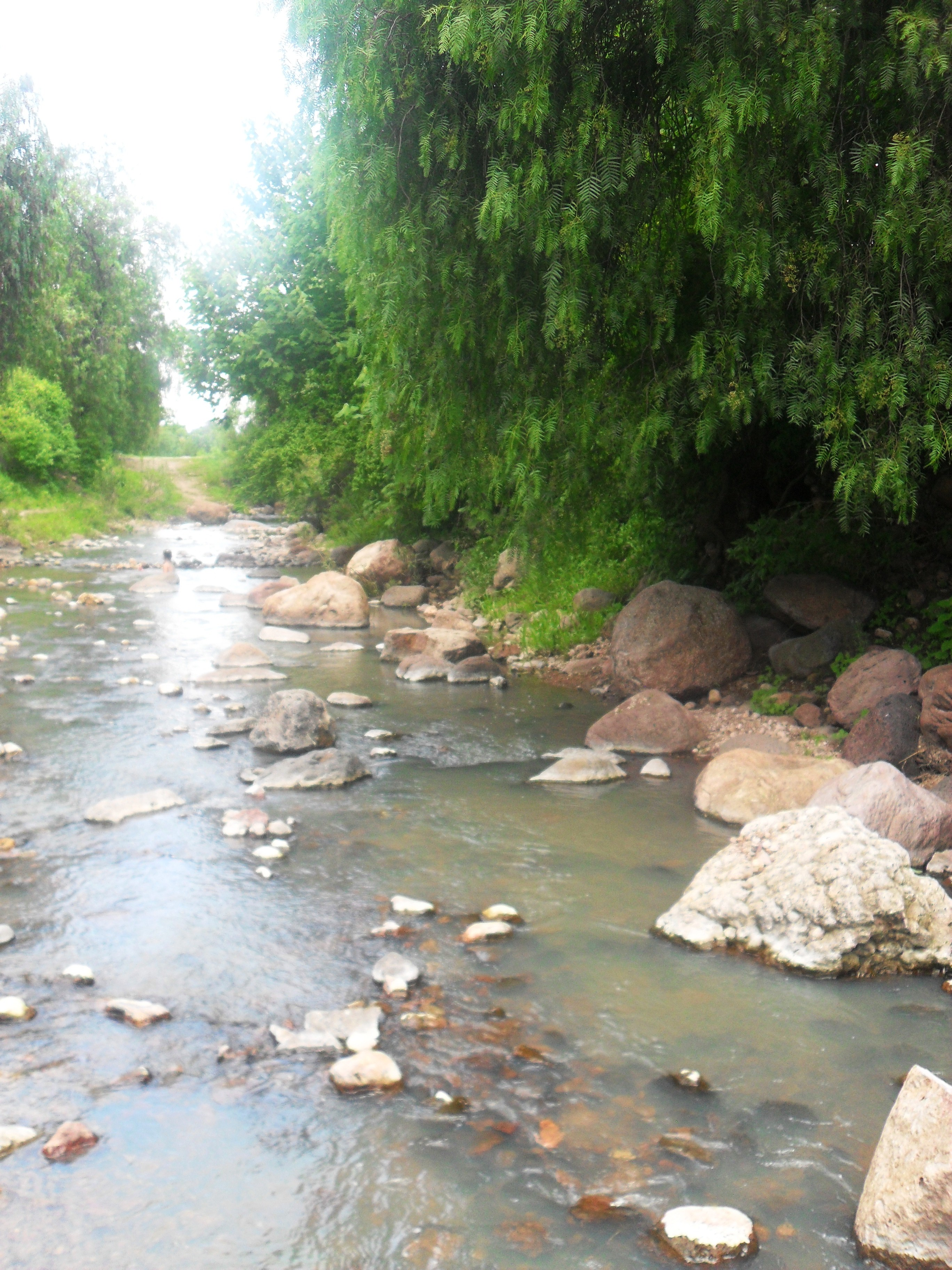
Arroyo Blanco

The municipality is located in the north of the state of Michoacán and has an average altitude of 1,840 meters above sea level. The territory is relatively flat as part of the Cuitzeo Depression with some hills such as the Manuma, Campanas, Coronilla, Encina and Amoles.

=== Hydrography ===
The main surface water is Lake Cuitzeo, but there are two main streams called Colorado and Blanco. There is also a dam called San Cristóbal.

=== Climate ===
The climate is temperate with an average annual rainfall of 965 ml. Temperatures vary between 12.4 and 27.2C.

=== Flora and fauna ===
Most of the wild vegetation is grassland, with huisache, opuntia, mesquite and other arid plants. Wildlife mostly consists of squirrels, cacomixtles, coyotes, rabbits, aquatic birds, and various fish.
