= Quercus purhepecha =

Scientific classification
- Kingdom: Plantae
- Clade: Embryophytes
- Clade: Tracheophytes
- Clade: Angiosperms
- Clade: Eudicots
- Clade: Rosids
- Order: Fagales
- Family: Fagaceae
- Genus: Quercus
- Subgenus: Quercus subg. Quercus
- Section: Quercus sect. Quercus
- Species: Q. purhepecha

Binomial name
- Quercus purhepecha De Luna-Bon., S.Valencia & Coombes

Species of flowering plant

Quercus purhepecha is a species of oak endemic to the state of Michoacán in western Mexico. It is a low rhizomatous shrub, 0.3 to 0.7 meters tall. It is known only from the Lake Cuitzeo Basin in the Trans-Mexican Volcanic Belt from 2,100 to 2,400 meters elevation.

The species was described by Oscar Angel De Luna-Bonilla, Susana Valencia Ávalos, and Allen James Coombes in 2024. The species is named for the Purépecha people indigenous to the species' native region.
