= Degollado =

Degollado Los Altos
- Municipality and town
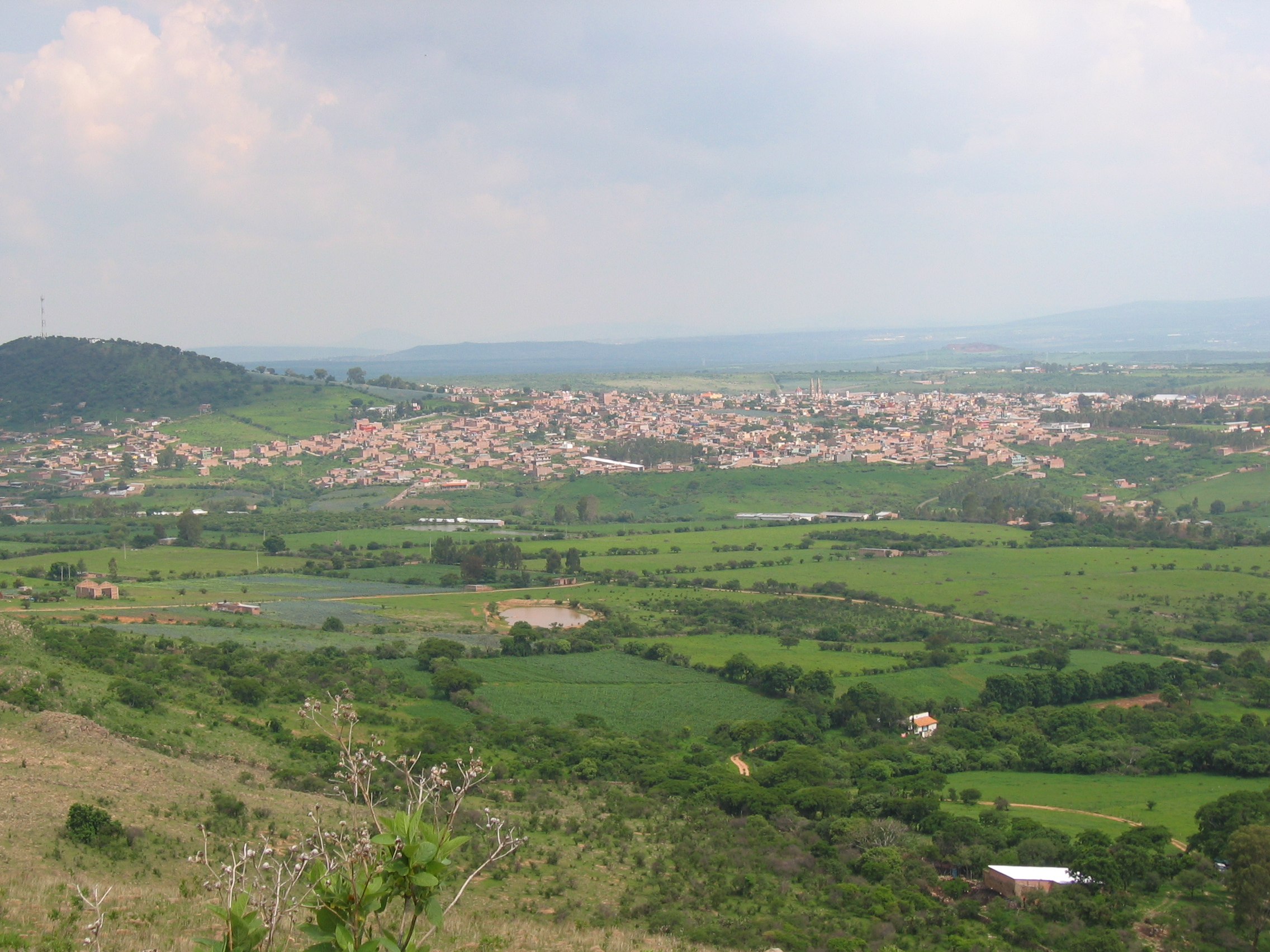

- Coat of arms
- Nickname: La Puerta de Los Altos de Jalisco
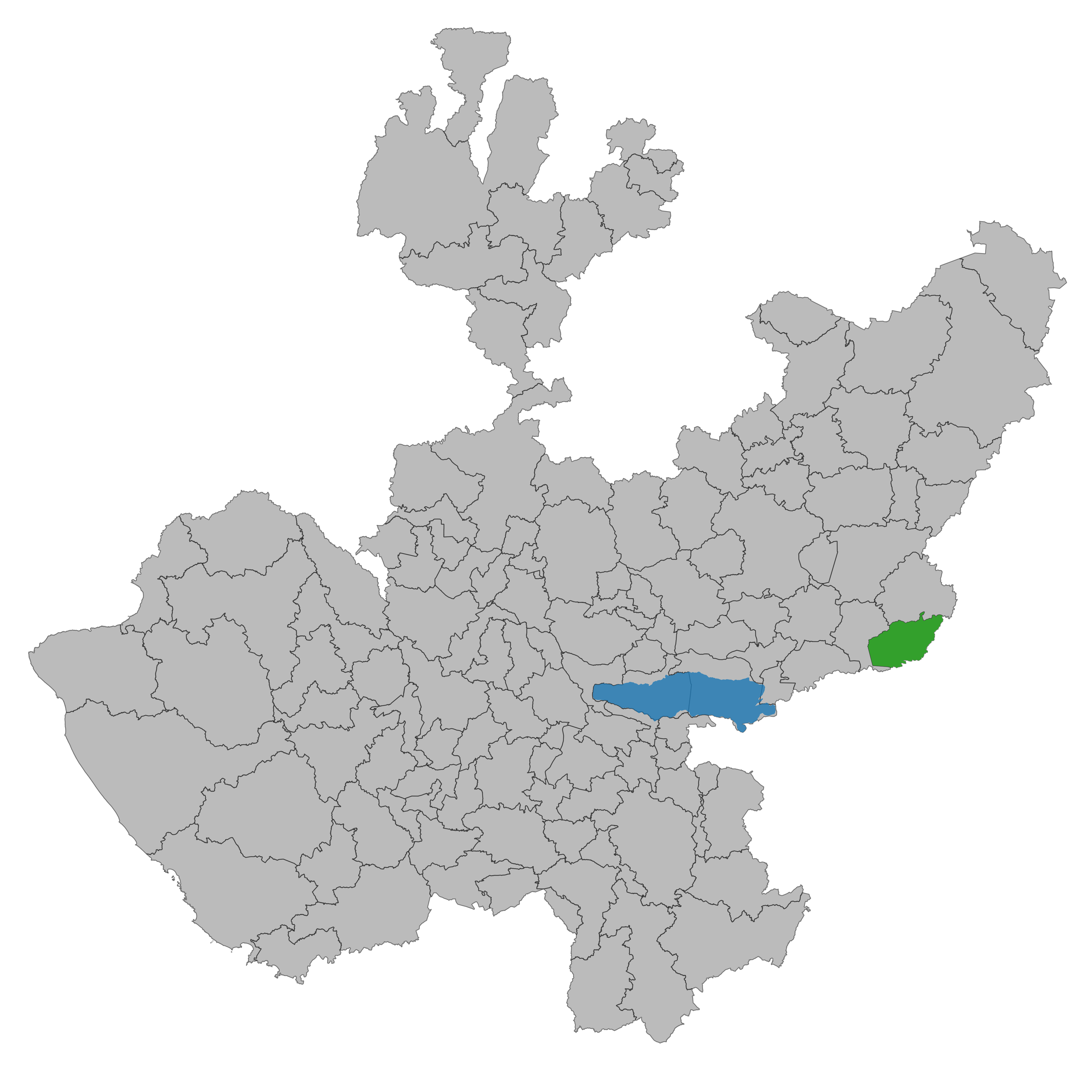
- Location within the state of Jalisco

- Jalisco's location within Mexico
- Coordinates: 20.466667°N 102.15°W
- Country: Mexico
- State: Jalisco
- Municipality: Degollado
- Founded: 1848 (Toribio de Bolaños)

Government
  - Mayor: Antonio Medina

Area
  - Total: 426.7 km^{2} (164.7 sq mi)
  - Town: 5.27 km^{2} (2.03 sq mi)

Population (2020 census)
  - Total: 21,226
  - Density: 49.74/km^{2} (128.8/sq mi)
  - Town: 11,612
  - Town density: 2,200/km^{2} (5,710/sq mi)
- Time zone: UTC-6 (Central (US Central))
- Postal code: 47980
- Area code: (52) 345
- Website: www.degollado.gob.mx

Degollado (Spanish: [deɣoˈʝaðo]) is a small town and municipality located in the Mexican state of Jalisco, in the cultural region of Ciénega, just south of Los Altos. The town is mainly rural in nature, but the municipality encompasses several concentrated residential areas, such as Huascato, Los Ranchitos, La Vibora, Buenos Aires, Las Limas, Altamira, La Chancla and El Corral de Piedra.

The town is named after Mexican general Santos Degollado. A statue of him is in the Jardin de Niños which was made from coins from the townspeople during the early 1960s.

== History ==
The town dates back to the 19th century to land east of Ayotlán known as Los Encinos. A chapel was erected and blessed by the priest of Ayotlán Clemente Pérez in 1856, whose patron saint is San Ignacio de Loyola.

For this reason, the growing village was given the name of San Ignacio de Morelos in 1857, also commonly referred to as San Ignacio de los Encinos. The town was renamed after general Santos Degollado in 1861.

On December 24, 1917, the town was under siege by bandit leader J. Inés García Chávez. Degollado is also one of the places in highlands of Jalisco where the Cristero War took place during the 1920s.

== Arts and culture ==
The holy patroness of Degollado is Our Lady of Guadalupe and is celebrated in the town center on December 12.

Degollado is famous for its cantera (freestone masonry). One of the best selling products are stone images of the Virgin of Guadalupe and sculptures, such as fountains, animals, and columns.

The town is known for tequila production, with much of the surrounding farmland cultivated for the blue agave plant.

In July 2019, the Iowa Organization of Professional Fire Chiefs donated US $90,000 (MXN $171,000) worth of firefighting equipment to the Degollado Fire Department.
