= Tarímbaro =

Municipality in Michoacán, Mexico

Coordinates: 19°48′N 101°10′W

- Municipality
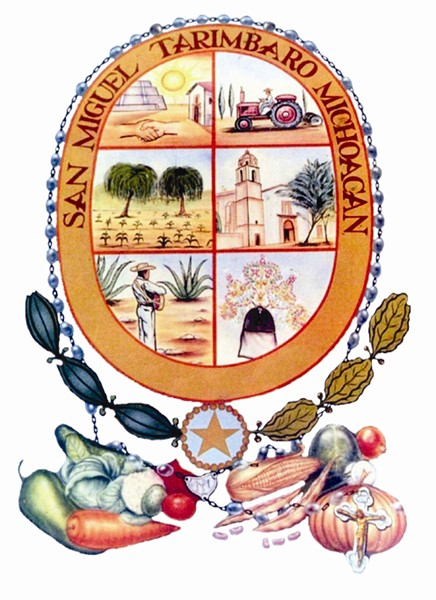
- Coat of arms

- Location in Mexico Tarímbaro (Mexico)
- Country: Mexico
- State: Michoacán
- Demonym: (in Spanish)
- Time zone: UTC−6 (CST)

Tarímbaro is a municipality in the Mexican state of Michoacán. The municipality has an area of 258.57 square kilometres (0.43% of the surface of the state) and is bordered to the north by Copándaro, Meson Nuevo and Cuitzeo, to the east by Álvaro Obregón, to the south by Morelia and Charo, and to the west by Chucándiro. The municipality had a population of 51,479 inhabitants according to the 2005 census. Its municipal seat is the city of the same name.

== Economy ==
The economy of the municipality is mostly based on agriculture and ranching.

== History ==
In pre-Hispanic times the region of present-day Tarímbaro was inhabited by the semi-nomadic Chichimeca (who knew the area "place of the willows") and the Purépecha people of Central Mexico.

As of March 3, 2021, the municipality had reported 625 confirmed cases and 77 deaths from the COVID-19 pandemic in Mexico. Five-time mayor Baltazar Gaona Sánchez, 80 (PRD), became victim number 78 on March 5.
