= José Inés García Chávez =

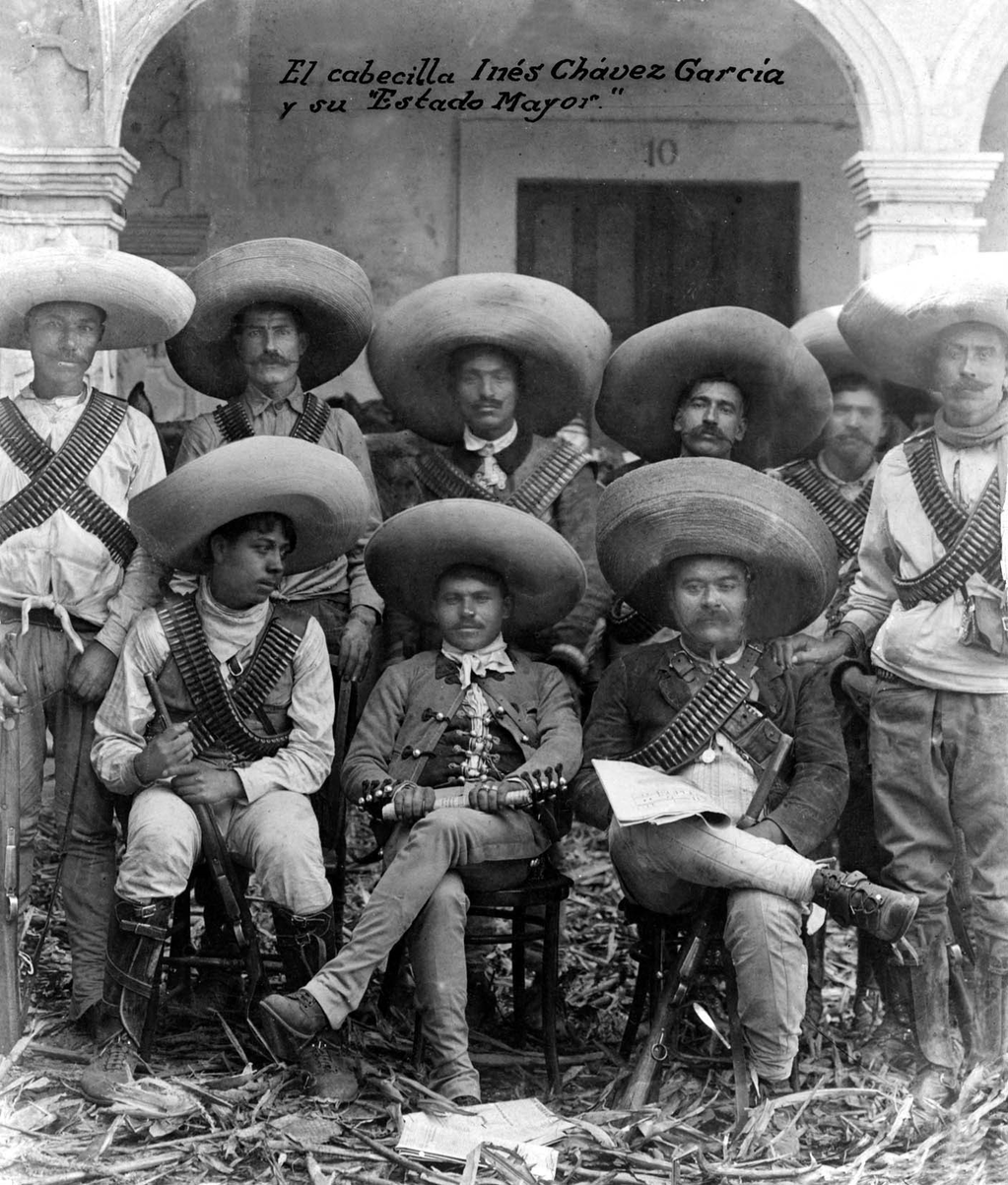
- José Inés García Chávez and his staff

Leader of The Painted Leopards
- In office 1915–1918

Personal details
- Born: 19 April 1889 Godino, Puruándiro, Michoacán
- Died: 1918 (29 years old) Mexico
- Nickname(s): The Attila of Michoacán, Jalisco and Guanajuato

Military service
- Allegiance: Mexico (antireeleccionista revolutionary forces)
- Rank: General
- Commands: The Painted Leopards
- Battles/wars: Mexican Revolution Sack of Apatzingán Sack of Paracho Sack of Cotija Sack of Degollado Battle of Huandacareo

José Inés García Chávez or Inés Chávez García (Note: By rights, his surnames were "García Chávez", but he was most frequently known as "Chávez García".) was a Mexican military man and bandit who participated in the Mexican Revolution.

== Early life ==
He was born in Godino, Puruándiro, Michoacán, on 19 April 1889. He was the son of Anacleto García and Bartola Chávez.

== Career ==
He was a cameraman during the Porfiriato (the period that General Porfirio Díaz ruled Mexico as president) and thus fought Santana Rodríguez Palafox in Veracruz. He was part of the group that rose against Victoriano Huerta under Anastasio Pantoja, but when the Carrancistas shot at him, Chávez rose up in arms and joined the Villista Army. He operated in the Abajoña of Michoacán and the states of Jalisco and Guanajuato, recruiting thousands of soldiers.

His fighting style was one of a guerrilla or bandit and his greatest success came in 1917. His army was feared in all regions of Michoacán, Jalisco and Guanajuato, for its brutality, especially towards women and children. Between 1915 and 1918, Inés Chávez torched the towns of Apatzingán, Paracho, Cotija and Degollado. He became known as "the Attila of Michoacán, Jalisco and Guanajuato", and his army as "The Painted Leopards".

== Death ==
Chávez's death is murky. Some sources claim that he died on 8 January 1918, during the Battle of Huandacareo after assaulting several towns. Other sources say he died either of Spanish Influenza or of battle injuries in Michoacán on 11 November 1918.

== Bibliography ==
- Garciadiego, Javier (2010). "José Inés Chávez García, ¿rebelde, bandido social, simple bandolero o precursor de los cristeros?" [José Inés Chávez García: rebel, social bandit, simple brigand, or precursor of the Cristeros?]. Historia Mexicana (in Spanish). 60 (2). Mexico City: El Colegio de México.
- INEHRM (2019). "13 de noviembre de 1918: Muere el rebelde José Inés Chávez García" [13 November 1918: Rebel José Inés Chávez García Dies]. Instituto Nacional de Estudios Históricos de la Revolución Mexicana.
- Purnell, Jennie (1999). Popular Movements and State Formation in Revolutionary Mexico: The Agraristas and Cristeros of Michoacán. Duke University Press. ISBN 9780822323143. - Total pages: 271
