= Copándaro =

Municipality in Mexico

Coordinates: 19°54′N 101°13′W

- Municipality
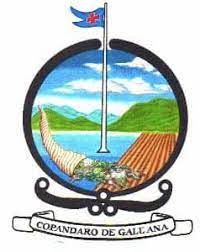
- Coat of arms

- Location in Mexico Copándaro (Mexico)
- Country: Mexico
- State: Michoacán
- Demonym: (in Spanish)
- Time zone: UTC−6 (CST)

Copándaro is a municipality in the Mexican state of Michoacán. The municipality has an area of 173.52 square kilometres (0.21% of the surface of the state) and is bordered to the north by Huandacareo and Cuitzeo, to the east and south by Tarímbaro, and to the west by Chucándiro. The municipality had a population of 8,131 inhabitants according to the 2005 census. Its municipal seat is the city of Copándaro de Galeana.

The main communities found in the municipality are Copándaro de Galeana, San Agustín del Maíz, Santa Rita, El Nispo, Arúmbaro, Congotzio, La Canada, and Las Canoas.

== Origin of Copandaro ==
The word Copándaro is of Purépecha language origin and means "place of the avocado".

== See also ==
- Municipalities of Michoacán
