= Lake Cuitzeo =

Lake in Michoacán State, Mexico

- Lago de Cuitzeo (Spanish)
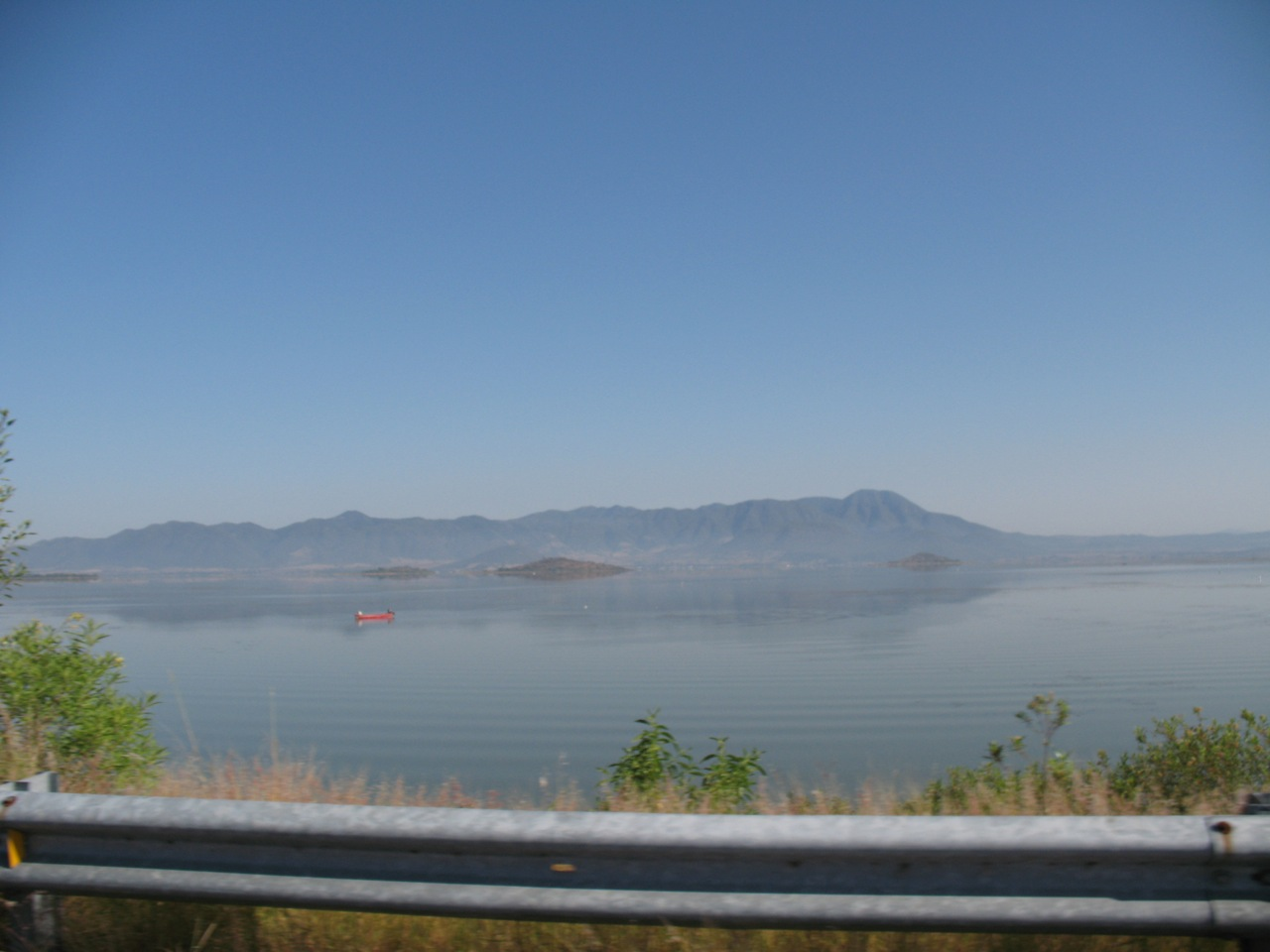

- Location within Mexico Lake Cuitzeo (Michoacán)
- Interactive map of Lake Cuitzeo
- Location: Michoacán / Guanajuato, Mexico
- Coordinates: 19°56′0″N 101°5′0″W
- Primary outflows: A canal which follows the Guanajuato-Michoacan border northward
- Basin countries: Mexico
- Max. length: 20 km (12 mi)
- Max. width: 20 km (12 mi)
- Surface area: 300–400 km^{2} (120–150 sq mi)
- Average depth: 0.9 m (2 ft 11 in)
- Surface elevation: 1,830 m (6,000 ft)
- Islands: 11
- Settlements: Cuitzeo; Copándaro de Galeana; Chucándiro; Huandacareo; Irámuco

Lake Cuitzeo (Spanish: [kwitˈseo]) is a lake in the central part of Mexico, in the state of Michoacán. It has an area of 300–400 km^{2} (120–150 sq mi). The lake is astatic, meaning the volume and level of water in the lake fluctuates frequently. It is the second-largest freshwater lake in Mexico.

Lake Cuitzeo lies in an endorheic basin, which does not drain to the sea, although in prehistoric times the lake may well have overflowed during periods of increased inflow, since the lowest point on its rim is only 10–20 meters above the current maximum elevation of the lake's surface. The basin has an area of 4,026 km^{2} (1,554 sq mi), lying mostly in Michoacán, with the northern part of the basin in Guanajuato state. Michoacán's capital, Morelia, lies in the Cuitzeo basin south of the lake. The basin of the Lerma River lies to the east and north, and the basin of the Balsas River lies to the south, separated by the mountains of the Trans-Mexican Volcanic Belt. The endorheic basin of Lake Pátzcuaro lies to the west.

The lake is irregular in shape, with northern, western, and eastern sections connected by a central marshy area, which receives the main freshwater inflows. It has no natural outflow, but an outflow canal was cut to the north at the low point in the basin's rim, allowing the lake to drain via Lake Yuriria into the Lerma River when the water level is high; this limits the elevation of the lake to 1830 meters. The western section was divided in two by the construction of north-south highways. The western portion is saltier, and sustains unusual fisheries of clam shrimps (Eocyzicus digueti and Leptestheria compleximanus), as well as hemipterans, and ephydrids. The lake basin is the only habitat for Thamnophis eques cuitzeoensis, a subspecies of the essentially harmless, semi-aquatic Mexican garter snake.

The three main inflows to the lake are the Viejo de Morelia, Grande de Morelia, and Querendaro rivers. These rivers originate in the mountains to the south, and sustain an irrigated agricultural area south of the lake, entering the central portion of the lake as irrigation canals. The main crops are maize, cotton, and coffee.

About 40 percent of the basin is agricultural fields, 15 percent is pasture, 20 percent is pine-oak forests, and 15 percent is tropical dry forest. The pine-oak forests lie at higher elevations, and are part of the Trans-Mexican Volcanic Belt pine-oak forests ecoregion. The Bajío dry forests ecoregion covers the lower-lying parts of the basin, extending north into the basin of the Lerma River.

== Sports ==
The lake has several small island with pre-hispanic remains, with one of the islands was used as a pre-hispanic cemetery. Bird watching occurs at the lake, particularly in winter when many different migratory species can be seen. It is also a beautiful lake for kayaking, especially near the town of San Bernardo. This town is 13 km west from the entrance of Morelia International Airport following the road to Zinapécuaro.

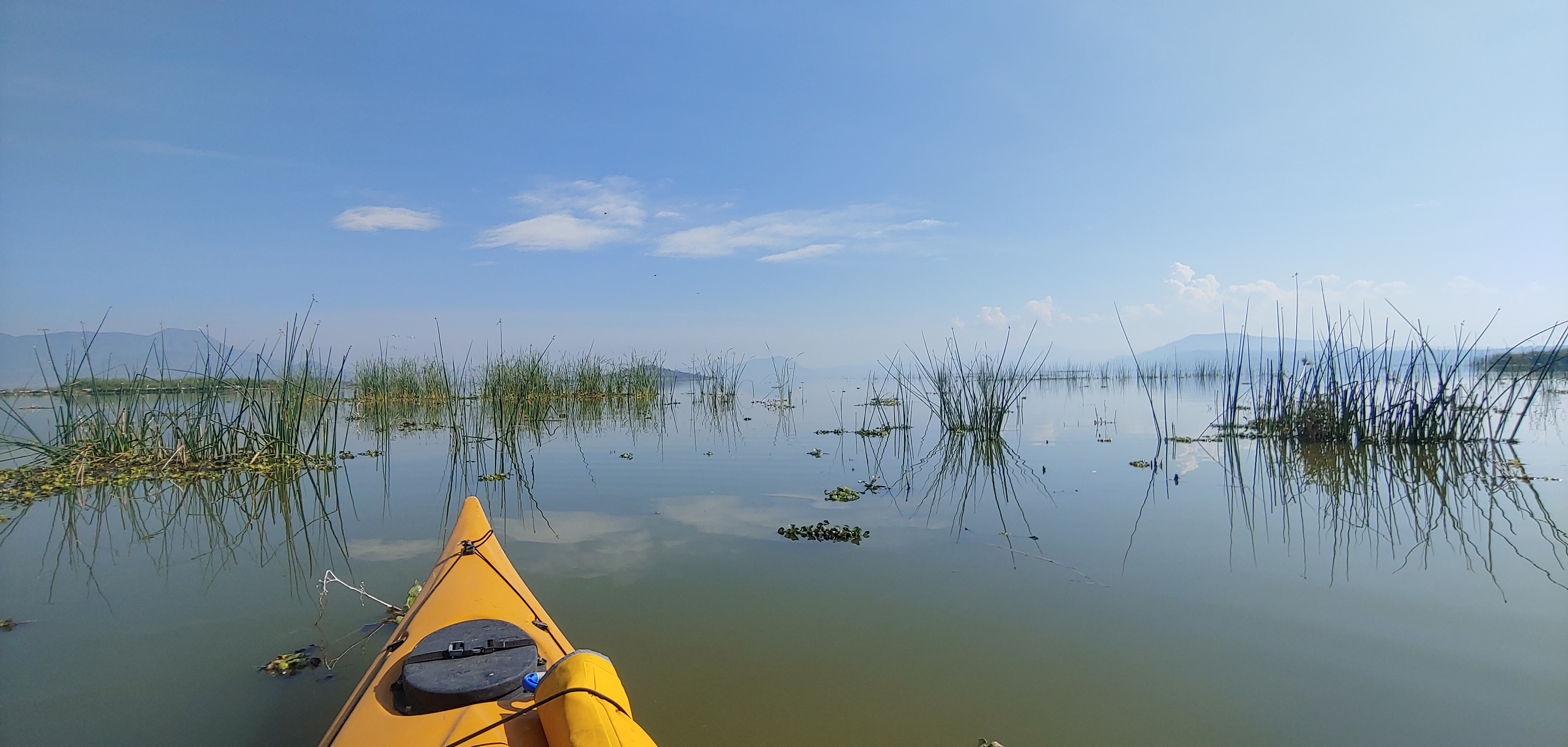
Kayaking in Lake Cuitzeo

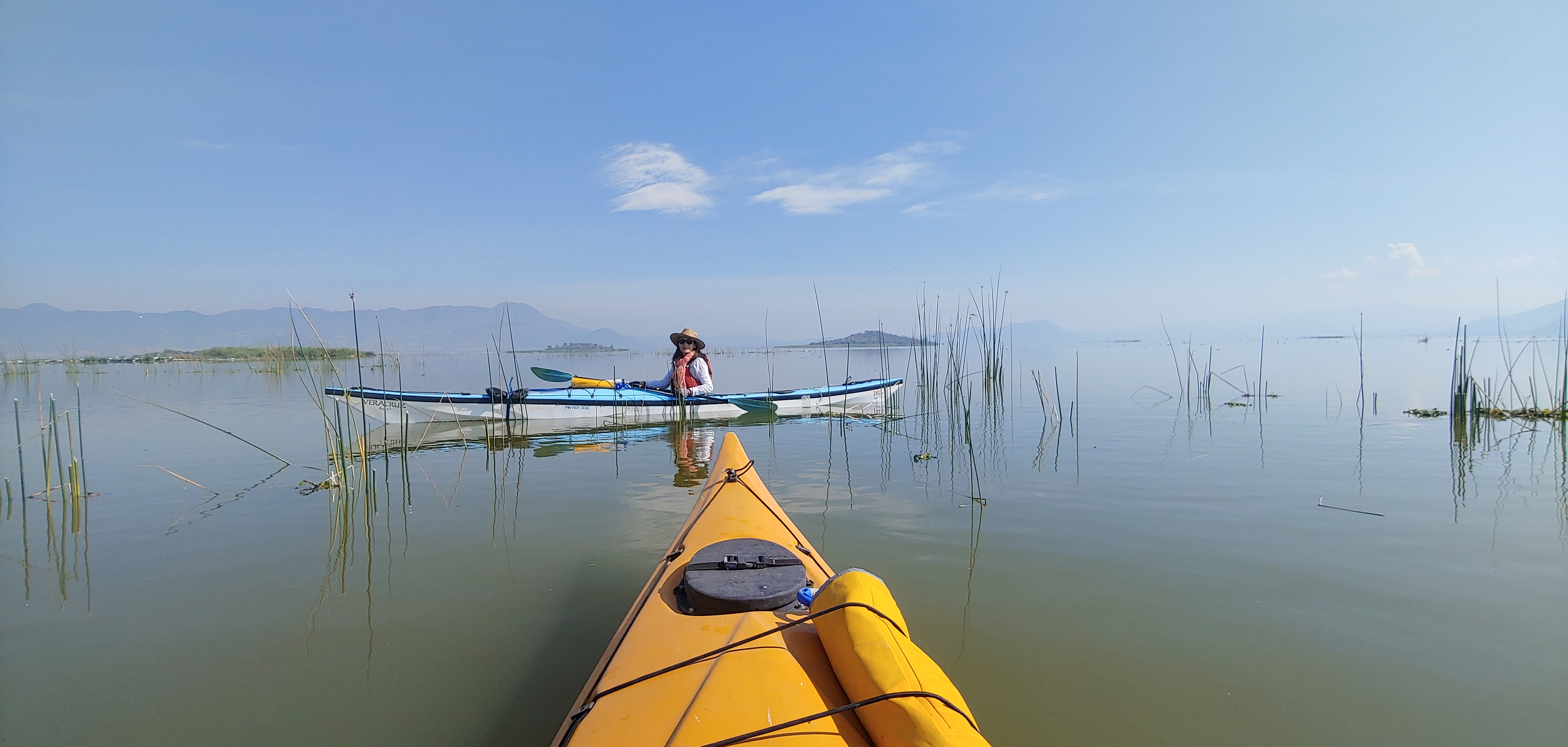

== Sources ==
- Alcocer, Javier (March 2003). "The Future of Salt Lakes: The Case of Mexico" (PDF). Environmental Future of Aquatic Ecosystems. 5th International Conference on Environmental Future. Zurich. Archived from the original (PDF) on 2004-07-16.
- Bocco, Gerardo; López Granados, Erna; Mendoza, Manuel E. (January 2012), "La Investigación Ambiental en la Cuenca del Lago de Cuitzeo: Una Revisión de la Bibliografía Publicada" [Environmental Research in the Lake Cuitzeo Basin: A Review of the Published Bibliography], in Bravo, Miguel; Camacho, G. Barrera; Mendoza, T., Manuel E.; Reyes, Sáenz; Martínez, R. Sánchez; Bahena Juarez, Fernando (eds.), Contribuciones para el desarrollo sostenible de la cuenca del Lago de Cuitzeo, Michoacán [Contributions for the sustainable development of the Lake Cuitzeo basin, Michoacán] (PDF) (in Spanish), Instituto Nacional de Investigaciones Forestales, Agrícolas y Pecuarias. Centro de Investigación Regional Pacífico Centro. Campo Experimental Uruapan, Mexico. & Universidad Nacional Autónoma de México Centro de Investigaciones en Geografía Ambiental, pp. 301–308
- Bernal-Brooks, Fernando (1998). "The Lakes of Michoacán (Mexico): A Brief History and Alternative Point of View" (PDF). Freshwater Forum. Pátzcuaro, Mexico. Archived from the original on February 22, 2016.
- Conant, Roger (2003). "Observations on garter snakes of the Thamnophis eques complex in the lakes of Mexico's transvolcanic belt, with descriptions of new taxa". American Museum Novitates (3406): 1–64. doi:10.1206/0003-0082(2003)406<0001:OOGSOT>2.0.CO;2. hdl:2246/2832. S2CID 86078121.
- Galindo de Obario, Marcela (2005). Water Quality and its Spatial Variability in Lake Cuitzeo, Mexico (PDF) (MSc thesis). Enschede, Netherlands: International Institute for Geo-Information Science and Earth Observation. Archived from the original (PDF) on December 10, 2017.
- "Growing Demand For Mexico Water Resources". USDA. Archived from the original on 11 March 2007.
