= Huandacareo =

Archaeological zone in Michoacán, Mexico

Huandacareo Archaeological Site
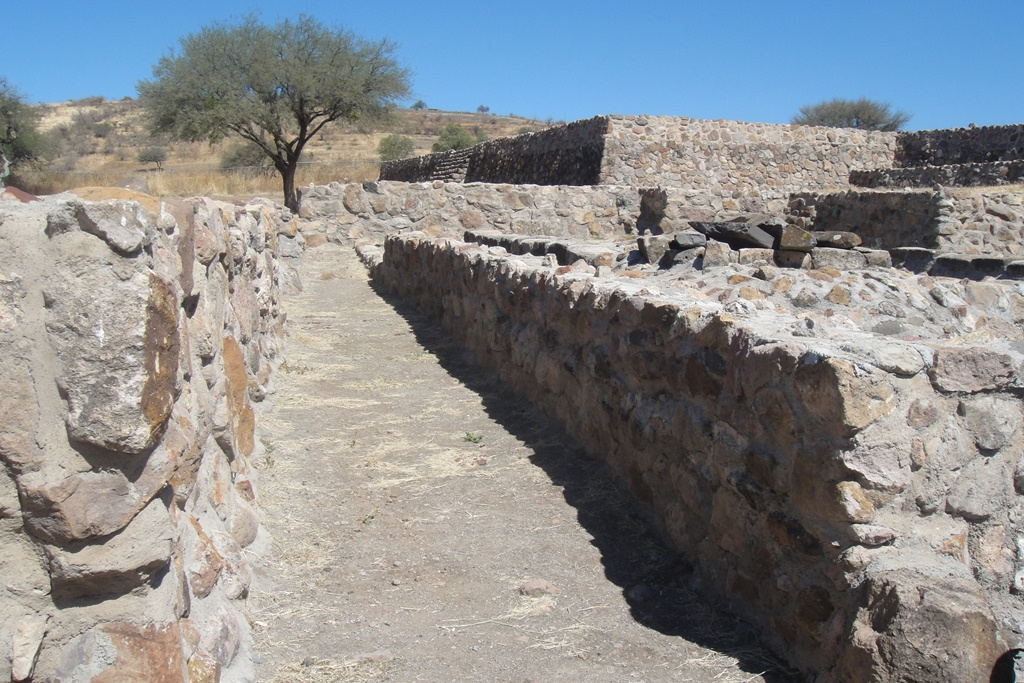
- Main structure platform on the background, burial area inside the right basement
- Interactive map of Huandacareo Archaeological Site
- 19°59′41″N 101°17′19″W
- Type: Mesoamerican archaeology
- Periods: Mesoamerican Preclassical, Classical and Postclassical
- Cultures: Chupicuaro – Chichimec - Purepecha
- Location: Huandacareo, Michoacán, Mexico
- Region: Mesoamerica

History
- Built: 1200 – 1530 CE

Site notes
- Website: Huandacareo Archaeological Site Archived 2010-01-12 at the Wayback Machine

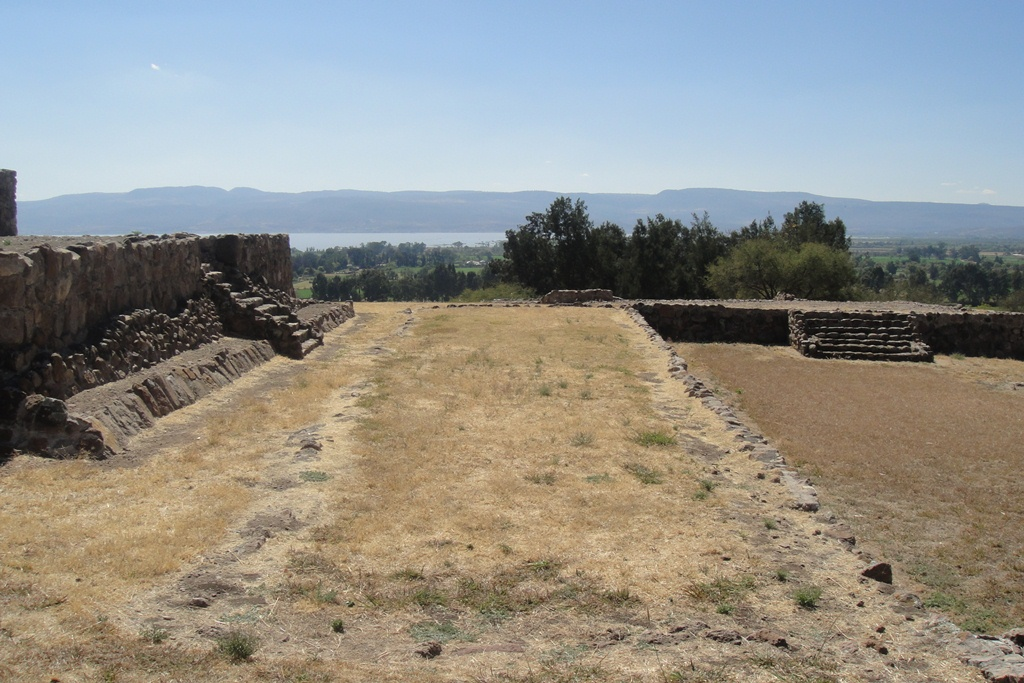
Main structure, temple to the left and sunken patio to the right. The lake is on the background

Huandacareo (or Guandacareo) is an archaeological zone located about 60 kilometers north of the city of Morelia, in the state of Michoacán.

The site was constructed on an elevated plateau overlooking the Cuitzeo lake, some 2.46 kilometers (1.53 miles) from its north western shores and about two kilometers from the center of the Huandacareo town and municipality. Locally the place is better known as "The Nopalera".

The site is located on the western side of Lake Cuitzeo, located at around 19°56′0″N 101°5′0″W. It has an area of 300–400 km^{2}.

The lake is astatic, and the volume and level of water in the lake fluctuates frequently. It is the second largest freshwater lake in Mexico.

Although this site is of a clear Purépecha ancestry, the geographic location on the Cuitzeo basin and the ceremonial center concept, attests to the presence of some cultural elements originating elsewhere. As an example obsidian from the "cerro de Zináparo" in northern Michoacán or from Zinapécuaro east of Cuitzeo can be noted; as well as coastal materials, especially the Pacific Ocean. Also from the Mexican plateau and certainly from the Purépecha region of Pátzcuaro, that provided the main cultural influence.

== Background ==
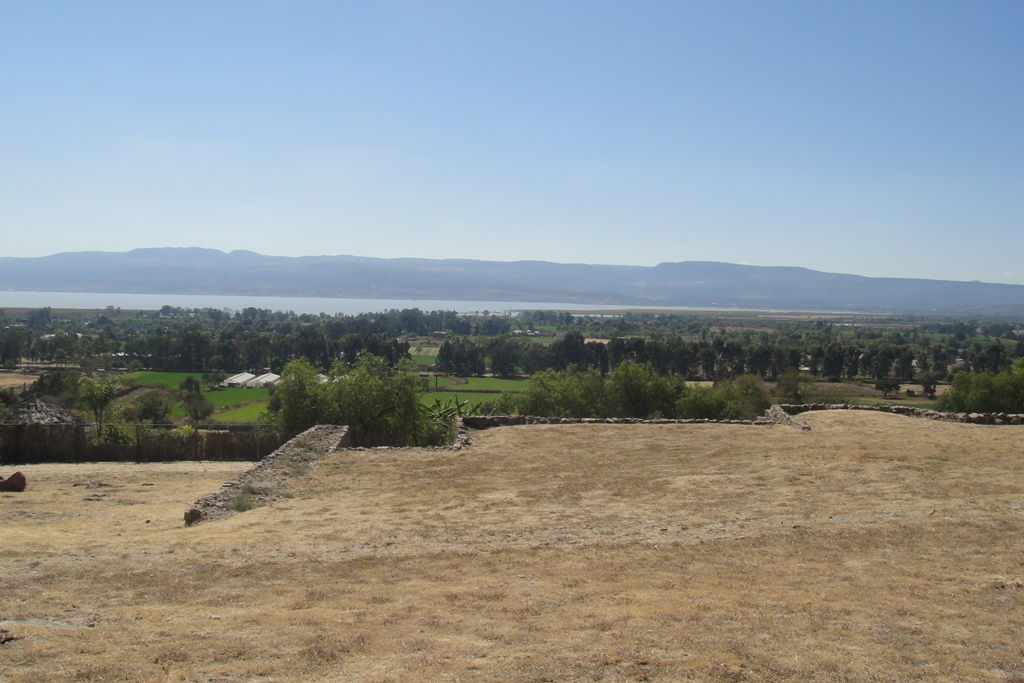
Terraces overlooking the Cuitzeo lake

The site is located in the Michoacán (Spanish pronunciation: [mitʃoaˈkan]) region. The name Michoacán is from Nahuatl and means "place of the fishermen" referring to those who fish on Lake Pátzcuaro. In prehispanic times, the area was the home of the Purépecha Empire, which rivaled the Aztec Empire. The state has today native members of the Purépecha people as well as Otomis and Nahuas.

According to the archeological evidence, there has been human habitation within the territory of Michoacán state for at least 10,000 years. In the pre-Hispanic period there were a number of waves of migration into the area, including the Pirinda, Nahua, Huetamo, Colima, Purépecha and other peoples. There are sites of formal settlements from all Mesoamerican period. Important sites include El Opeño and those in Curutarán, Tepalcatepec Apatzingán, Zinapécuaro and Coalcoman. The territory has been inhabited by the Nahuas, Otomis, Matlatzincas, Pirindas and Tecos as well as the Purépecha. Archeological sites found in the state, have helped clarify the historical origin and ethnicity development of Michoacán. It dates back to the Mesoamerican formative or preclassical period (1500 to 200 BCE), the classical period (200 BCE to 1000 CE) and the post-classical (800 to 1000 CE). Those sites include: El Opeño, Curutarán, la Villita, Tepalcatepec, Apatzingán, Zinapécuaro, Coalcomán, San Felipe de los Alzati, Tzintzuntzan, Tingambato, Pátzcuaro, Zacapu, Uruapan, Tzitzio, etc.

The main pre-Hispanic civilization of the state is that of the Purépecha, which was centered in the Lake Pátzcuaro area. Before the 13th century, both Nahua and Purépecha peoples were here, sustaining themselves by agriculture and fishing. The Purépecha are descendants of a late arrival of Chichimecas who came from the north. At Lake Patzcuaro, they came upon people with similar cultures to their own but who were more technically and socially advanced. The formation of the Purépecha state began in the 13th century, when these people started their own dominion at Uayameo, today Santa Fe de la Laguna and becoming dominant over the entire Lake Patzcuaro area by the 15th century. Conquest of neighboring tribes and territories occurred between 1401 and 1450, absorbing peoples with different cultures and languages into the empire. By the late 15th century, this state rivaled that of the Aztecs, expanding their territory over much of what is now Michoacán and into part of Colima, Nayarit, Querétaro, Guanajuato, Guerrero and Jalisco. The Aztecs attempted to invade Purépecha but were repelled. This would later cause the Purépecha to deny the Aztecs aid in the defense of Tenochtitlan against the Spanish.

The Michoacán history has been studied from archaeological evidence and historical documents, such as the literary work "Relación de Michoacán", written in 1524 by Frair Jeronimo de Alcalá. Hence it is known that the first settlers of the region were several Chichimeca tribes which arrived in different times, and therefore evolved differently.

=== Toponymy ===
According to INAH, Huandacareo comes from the Purépecha word Uandakua that has several meanings such as "Trial Place", "Speaker Place" or "tribunal".

According to another version the Huandacareo word, is of Chichimeca origin and translates as "Preaching Place", as it derives from the "huandaca" word that means "speech".

=== Chichimec culture ===
Chichimeca was the name that the Nahua peoples of Mexico generically applied to a wide range of semi-nomadic peoples who inhabited the north of modern-day Mexico and southwestern United States, and carried the same sense as the European term "barbarian". The name was adopted with a pejorative tone by the Spaniards when referring especially to the semi-nomadic hunter-gatherer peoples of northern Mexico. In modern times only one ethnic group is customarily referred to as Chichimecs, namely the Chichimeca Jonaz, although lately this usage is being changed for simply "Jonáz" or their own name for themselves "Úza".

The Chichimeca peoples were in fact many different groups with varying ethnic and linguistic affiliations. As the Spaniards worked towards consolidating the rule of New Spain over the Mexican native peoples during the 16th and 17th centuries, the "Chichimecan tribes" maintained a resistance. A number of ethnic groups of the region allied against the Spanish, and the following military colonization of northern Mexico has become known as the "Chichimeca Wars".

Many of the peoples called Chichimeca are virtually unknown today; few descriptions mention them and they seem to have been absorbed into mestizo culture or into other native ethnic groups. For example, virtually nothing is known about the peoples referred to as Guachichiles, Caxcanes, Zacatecos, Tecuexes, or Guamares. Others like the Opata or "Eudeve" are well described but extinct as a people.

=== Purépecha culture ===
The Purépecha area has been inhabited at least since the early Pre-classic period. Early lithic evidence from before 2500 B.C. like fluted points and stone utensils are found at some Megafauna kill sites. The earliest radio-carbon dates of archeological sites fall around 1200 B.C. The best known early Pre-classic culture of Michoacán was the Chupicuaro culture. Chupícuaro sites are mostly found on lake islands which can be seen as a sign of it having traits relating it to the later Purépecha cultural patterns. In the early Classic period, ballcourts and other artifacts demonstrate a Teotihuacan influence in the Michoacán region.

In the late classic at least two non-Purépecha ethnic groups lived around Lake Pátzcuaro: Nahuatl speakers in Jarácuaro, and some Chichimecan cultures on the northern banks, with the Nahua population being the second largest.

According to the Relación de Michoacán a visionary leader of the Purépecha named Taríacuri decided to gather the communities around Lake Pátzcuaro into one strong state. Around 1300 he undertook the first conquests and installed his sons Hiripan and Tangáxoan as lords of Ihuatzio and Tzintzuntzan respectively, himself ruling from Pátzcuari city. By the death of Taríacuri (around 1350), his lineage was in control of all the major centers around Lake Pátzcuaro. His son Hiripan continued the expansion into the area surrounding Lake Cuitzeo.

The people of the Purépecha Empire were mostly of Purépecha ethnic affiliation but also included other ethnic groups such as the Nahua, Otomi, Matlatzinca and Chichimec. These ethnic groups were gradually assimilated into the Purépecha majority group.

=== Chupícuaro culture ===
This culture is important due to the influence it had in the area. It is possible it spread to southern United States, 500 BCE. There are theories that the first Guanajuato inhabitants belonged to this culture.

Ceramics of this culture is earlier than the classical mesoamerican period, includes angular figurines with geometric shapes. The Acámbaro museum exhibit pieces from the Purépecha, Mazahua, and Otomi cultures.

Apparently the Chupícuaro culture developed in a vast territory, or it was defined as Chupícuaro style or tradition (Beatriz Braniff) in, Guanajuato, Michoacán, Guerrero, Mexico State, Hidalgo, Colima, Nayarit, Querétaro and Zacatecas. It is estimated that Chupícuaro facilitated the northward expansion of Mesoamerican elements (cultural roots of western Mexico and perhaps Northwest, comparable with the Olmec culture throughout Mesoamerica.

Chupícuaro had an important cultural development and expansion of its style in distant areas from the diffusing center and influenced ceramic traditions, which lasted until the end of the classical period, and even into the Postclassical, as seen in Purépecha Michoacán ceramic.

At the end of 1985, at the first prehispanic societies meeting, in relation to the Chupícuaro culture it was noted, that Chupícuaro tradition ceramics manufacturing groups, should be considered part of Mesoamerican stratified societies, with a definite political and territorial structure and not as isolated village societies, lacking ceremonial centers and architecture. From that first impulse, subsequent social groups presented own cultural expressions, at regional level in the Mesoamerican context.

== The Site ==
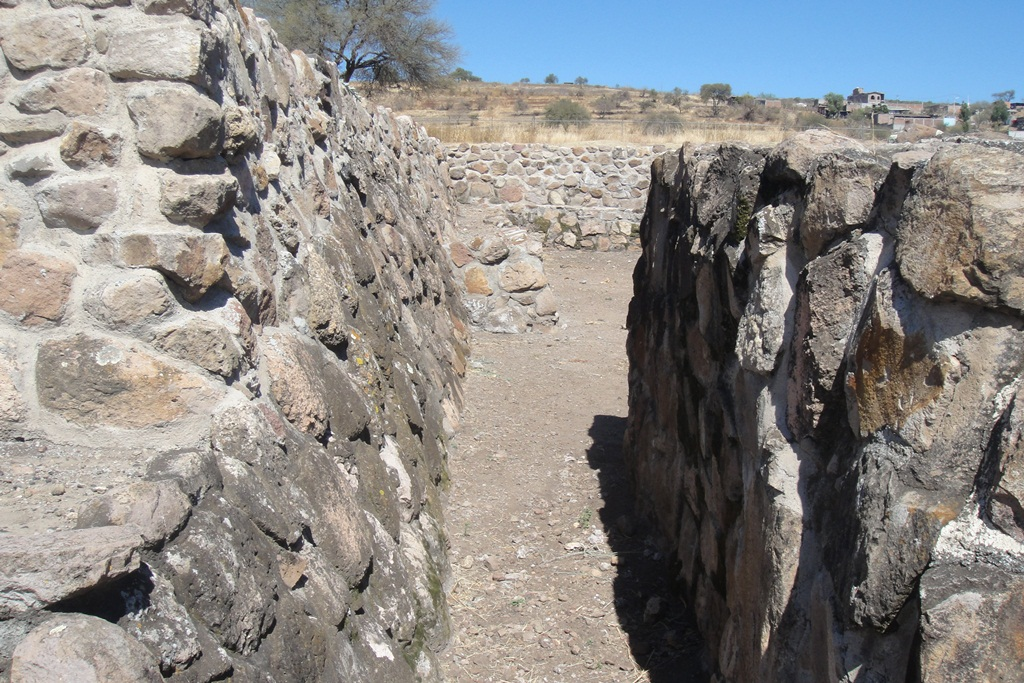
Detail of the south-east structure

The construction of this ceremonial center is estimated towards year 1200 CE, and it functioned until 1536, when Spaniard destruction of the Purépecha civilization occurred.

This is confirmed by the finding of a prehispanic characteristics burial, in which several European glass pieces were found, which means that when these materials were present in the Mexico plateau, in western Mesoamerica prevailed prehispanic cultural patterns.

=== Discovery and investigations ===
The first excavations season commenced in December 1977.

The site was vandalized by plunderers since the beginning of the last century, had excavated the site removing artifacts and by farmers that cultivated on the structures. Up to that time no archaeological work had been made in this region that revealed any antecedents for the need to initiate works.

The site topography was the only clue as to location of the structures, since initially there were visible signs of them; mounds could be seen mainly at the top of the hill. Once the first wall was found, it was named Structure A, excavations were extended following in both directions, removing dirt and rubbish.

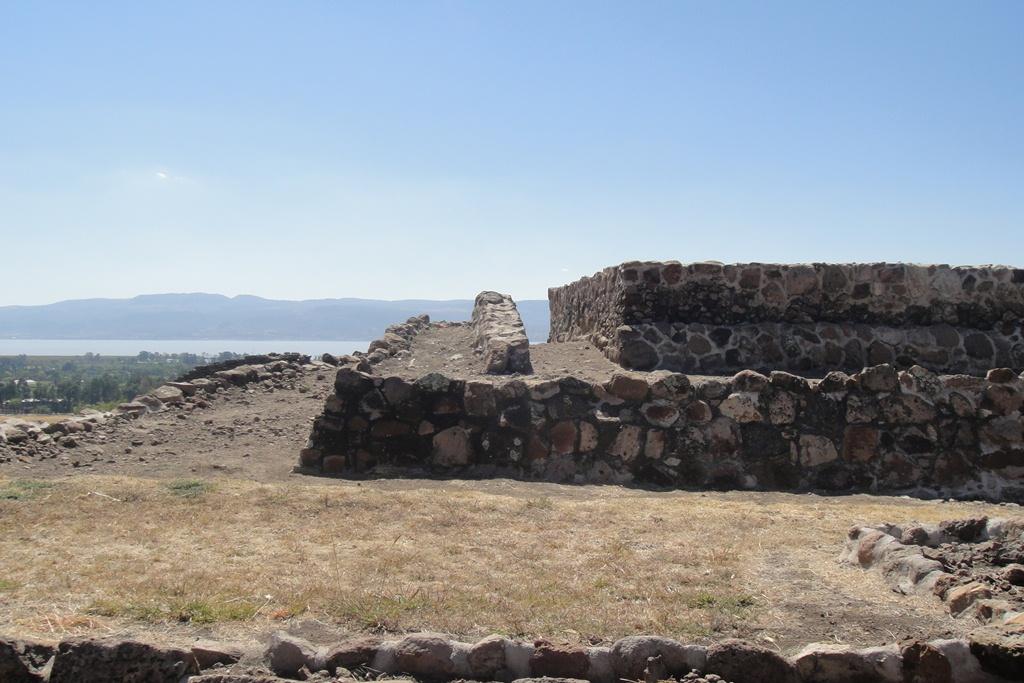
Western side of Temple on main structure, the lake on the background to the south

In addition to Structure A, other structures were found around the site. It is important to point out that according to Purépecha architectonic tradition, temples and their foundations always were built on top of natural hills, over an artificial platform, or, as in the Huandacareo case, over platforms and plazas, for this purpose they built retention walls embedded to the mountain slopes.

The site has been reconstructed, to differentiate original sections from those reconstructed; new sections are recessed five centimeter in average from the original sections.

From the first excavations season of 1977, five more seasons took place ending in 1983, since then, no further work has been performed. As a result of the little attention the place is neglected.

=== Historical brief ===
The site dates back to pre-Hispanic times and was part of the region oldest cultures in the region, known as "Chupícuaro", which was based in the creeks of the Cuitzeo Lake. They received Teotihuacán and pre-Purépecha influence. Later they were conquered by Purépechas, to whom tributes were paid.

According to tradition, the Cazonci, leading an army, marched towards Yuriria-Púndaro to fight certain tribes that were attacking the place and, after defeating them, the victorious army while returning home via the Cuitzeo Lake, stopped somewhere near the lake shores, to participate in festivities that celebrated the victory. Cazonci listened to numerous speeches in his honor and in agreement with tradition, as of that moment the place was called Huandacareo.

Huandacareo is one of many sites around the Cuitzeo Lake basin. It is a culturally important zone within the Michoacan region, from lake resources exploitation evidence from pre-Hispanic times. There are few studies of this type paleolithic environment in the country, in spite of information offered to anthropology. These include testimonies of the nutritional and artisan products that have been obtained throughout history, but also about the communication and transportation used by people. Not counting their importance until recently, such as hundreds of bird flocks refuge that migrate to hibernate. Given specific natural conditions, these ecological niches then worked to tie diverse human groups within the essential ancient trade networks.

Part of the historical information about this site, comes from the "Relación de Michoacan" (1542), the essential 16th century document that makes reference to this native community. By such reference it is known that the place was dominated by the Purépecha, from at least 300 years before Spaniards arrival. Data confirmed by archaeological excavations and objects found. Among these materials are not only the elegant typical pottery, negative decorated or pipes, but also metal objects, like bells, "fistoles", clamps or axes that demonstrates the presence of diversely applied metallurgical techniques. Most of these manufactures have older trajectories, product of millenarian cultural traditions. Thus in the sample place were found older objects. At the same time, these allowed to visualize the relation of this place with other neighboring communities and important cities, such as Teotihuacán, many years before the Purépecha arrival.

Within offerings and local architecture diverse exogenous raw materials and elements were found in the objects; including stone slabs for construction. Together with these materials, also found carved green stone slabs, turquoise, or projectile tips and obsidian ornaments from different mine sources, copper and gold; as well as marine shells from the Pacific Ocean. This confirms the antiquity of the place, its strategic importance within the communication routes, and mainly the political and commercial control at that time.

=== Objects found ===
Among findings in the Huandacareo archaeological site, are several copper tools, including eye needles, some 35 centimeters long. Also of made copper, but with ornamental and ritual purposes, found the following magnificent examples:

- Clamps. Important by their quantity and beauty, the clamps that were used not only to shave but also as adornment and to define a social hierarchy. These clamps appear on chronicles representations, these clamps are hung on the neck of important personages.
- Wire hoops. Many wire hoops with rectangular and circular section, these were frequently found in primary burials, probably used as earrings.
- Bells of several types and sizes, of false filigree and worked metal sheets.
- A very wide hoop was found with bells of worked metal, surrounded by soldiers, perhaps was used on a command baton.
- Ornaments consisting of an inverted U-shaped bar, finished with animal heads, possibly eagles with small bells hanging from their beak. The gold metallurgy samples are made on laminated gold and worked with hammers, possibly part of funerary material.
- Beads, four semi cylindrical pieces, perhaps part of a necklace, the existence of these objects demonstrate the high technological level reached by group (items originating from Chupícuaro and Pátzcuaro), which was only possible in towns whose solid economic base allowed them to have specialized craftsmen working full-time.

As far as Huandacareo Ceramics a complete pipe was found, representing an owl (tecolote).

Other ceramic objects worth mentioning are globular pieces, many with sgraffito: one of the most usual designs is one of lines that made up the infinite symbol. Also there are many "malacates" some decorated; their presence demonstrates the extended practice of vegetal fiber weave, mainly cotton. Special note is made of figurines found in this area. Their general feature is solid brown color pieces of several tones. All found are adult feminine figures, it is necessary to remember that feminine is related to lunar deities, all associated with agriculture, and aquatic related to fishing, both activities of sedentary societies; the heads of these figures appear deformed with front-occipital tabular type.

Also found, associated with an infant burial, was a gorgeous feminine figure about 14 centimeters tall, that carries a breast feeding boy about two years old astride; both figures display the deformed skull and have band hairdos that resemble the distorting instrument. The mother also wears a skirt and ornaments such as earflaps and necklace. Other animal figures found; these are small, solid, dark brown color, molded and unpolished. It was noted that all pieces found represent dogs, even though as is known there is a wide variety of fauna in the region. It is worth remembering that the Purépecha culture worshiped dogs.

As far as their detailed work knowledge, these are samples found:

- Domestic utensils: metates, mortar and "Tejolotes or Temachin" (grinding stone), metal fragments without and without support.
- Tools: ceramic polishers and other of bigger size, possibly for skin tanning.
- Sculpture: The fragment of the face of an old man found is very important, traditionally related to the God of the fire, divinity on which the Purépecha religion was based; it is believed that this sculpture is one of the few representations of Curicaueri (Sp.), "the great fire" or "Great burner).
- Ritual: discs made from slate, have been found measuring 16 centimeters diameter average, some with two symmetrical perforations. There is evidence in Huandacareo that these discs were used as clasps in the burials of high social hierarchy individuals.
- Various: 5 centimeters average stone spheres, made in obsidian, as with other pieces, no manufacturing remains or factories have been found, hence it is assumed that the pieces were imported from other places.

Such is the case, for the following found objects:

- Tools: projectile ends pressure re-touched and with base or extension; prismatic knives, some altered to make projectile ends, pins, cutters and knives, among others.
- Ornaments: extraordinary quality appraised, mainly tubular and spool earflaps, some are so thin that are translucent; also found some beautiful samples of "bezotes" (worn by high chiefs).
- Ritual: green obsidian ornaments as rich offerings for high rank individuals. Such is the case of pieces found within skull in some burials, as if these were placed in the person's mouth; these pieces are spherical or semi-square and always of green stone. In these same conditions a small rectangular piece was found, with an edge perforation, of a dark green stone and so polished that it seems mirror.

As far as Shell and Bone items, without a doubt the most important Purépecha culture items found here were made from these materials. The presence of these materials demonstrates that the settlers maintained contact with people from both coasts, whether for commerce or some other type of interchange, for example:

- Small trimmed snail necklaces with perforations.
- Circular Hoops catalogued as bracelets... human soldiers' figures, naked without gender beings, and with a hieratic position, dancers with a shell incrusted forming an eye.

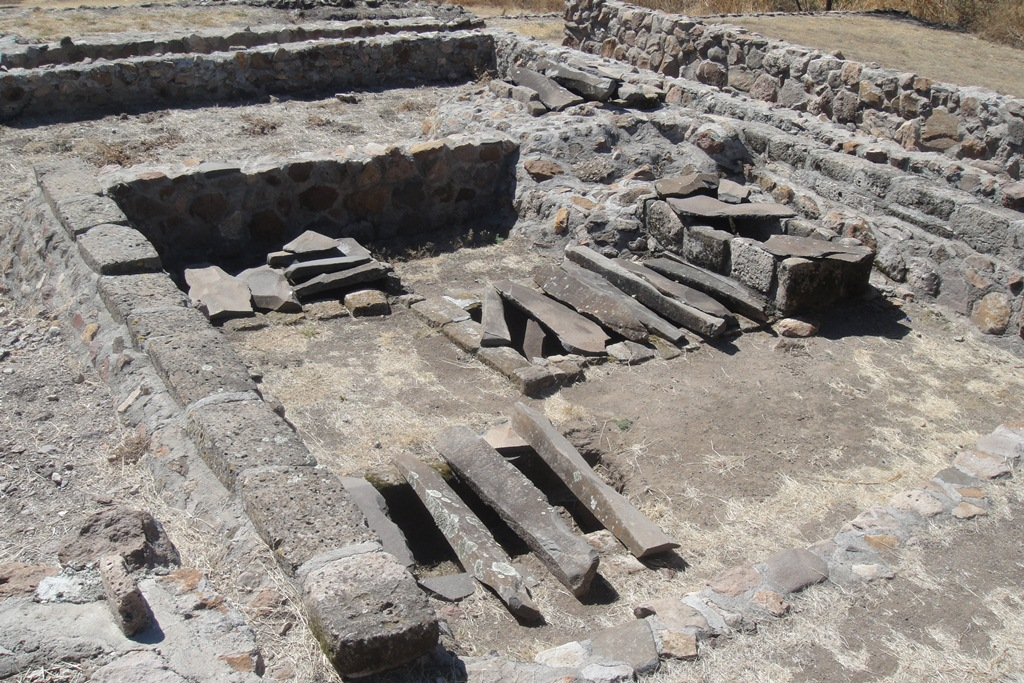
Location of burials, south western corner

Human burials containing human bones found in Huandacareo:

- Shaft Tomb excavated in tepetate that resembles the El Opeño, (Jacona, Michoacán) from the Preclassical period, although the Huandacareo tomb, from the cultural materials found as offering, it must be placed in the period immediately previous to the arrival of the Spaniards; the burial found corresponds to a primary burial of an old person and to a secondary burial of an adult.
- Six tombs were built on a perfectly outlined patio, one of them unfinished; there is another one associated to this group with the same characteristics; the walls are made with stone blocks perfectly cut and jointed with mortar; the floor is compacted earth; the tombs are covered by large stone slabs, some with worked edges. The location dimensions of six of them is very interesting as they were constructed symmetrically; in the central part of the group, the slab forming the roof of tomb number 2 serves as weight to number 4, that is oriented perpendicularly, with a cruciform aspect although in fact they are two rectangles. Each grave contained remains of an adult primary burial accompanied by rich and numerous offerings consisting of pottery, shell objects, bone and stone tools. A three by eighteen ditch was excavated, in which sixty three primary and secondary burials were found with numerous fragments clearly identified as decapitations or mutilations, that is to say, skulls with the atlas and maxillary bone in place or the bones of an arm with hand but without the rest of the body.

=== Political Organization ===
Authority was exerted through a hierarchical and coercive bureaucracy formed by civil employees who shared and invaded administrative, judicial, military and religious functions.

The central governmental apparatus based in Pátzcuaro and later in Tzintzuntzan was formed by: the Canzonci (governor), the Commander in chief (military), Deputies (collectors), the "Ocambecha" (reprimand or admonisher) and the "Petamuti" (greater priest). The Canzonci represented the Curicaueri God and as such governed and maintained alive the cult of the God.

== Structures ==
Even though everything seems to indicate that the place achieved its maximum enhancement and most visible constructions were built by 1200 CE, there are substructures and materials that correspond to earlier times; those related to the foundation of this center. Works accomplished have real impact on its history. What can be argued from one of the senses or meaning of its name: "Court", is the strategic importance for the Purépecha political and economic structure, to maintain this site in control of towns within its regime. It is pointed out, the construction of large reservoirs to lodge the mortuary remains of people socially important, in contrast with multiple burials directly in the ground; the majority with sacrifice evidence, beheaded and dismembered. These were located in front of one of the main buildings, known as "the Temple".

The explored part seems to indicate that the site was an administrative and religious center. It was built on a gentle hill slope, thus they had to build terraces with front retaining walls, to be able to level the ground and build constructions on them. Also such leveling forced the design and construction of water drainage channels. The presence of a sunken patio, as well as a construction of mixed plant (rectangular and circular) is an indication of a "yácata" (Tzintzuntzan); both constructions are samples of two different architectonic traditions, two cultural groups and two different time and space distributions. Remains of ancient housing units are underneath present day houses. This item needs to be confirmed.

Structures identified are the sunken plaza, Mound 1 and 2 in the Temple and the "tomb patio" are well-known; by their respective locations within the site, as for the constructive systems used to build them. Regional quarry white and pink stone was used, jointed with mud and there are remains of stuccoed surfaces, hardened with fire. Nevertheless, perhaps the most remarkable feature of the place is its physical and strategic location in front of Cuitzeo Lake.

The site construction, or what can be seen today, is located within a land plot of about 187 by 100 meters (614 by 328 ft), it depicts a complex center. Whether its purpose was as a political, religious or administrative is actually not known, the official version remains full of speculative assumptions.

The site is oriented on an east–west axis, with the main structure on the north-eastern corner, other structures cover the entire southern side and remains of other basements are along the northern side.

=== Main Structure ===
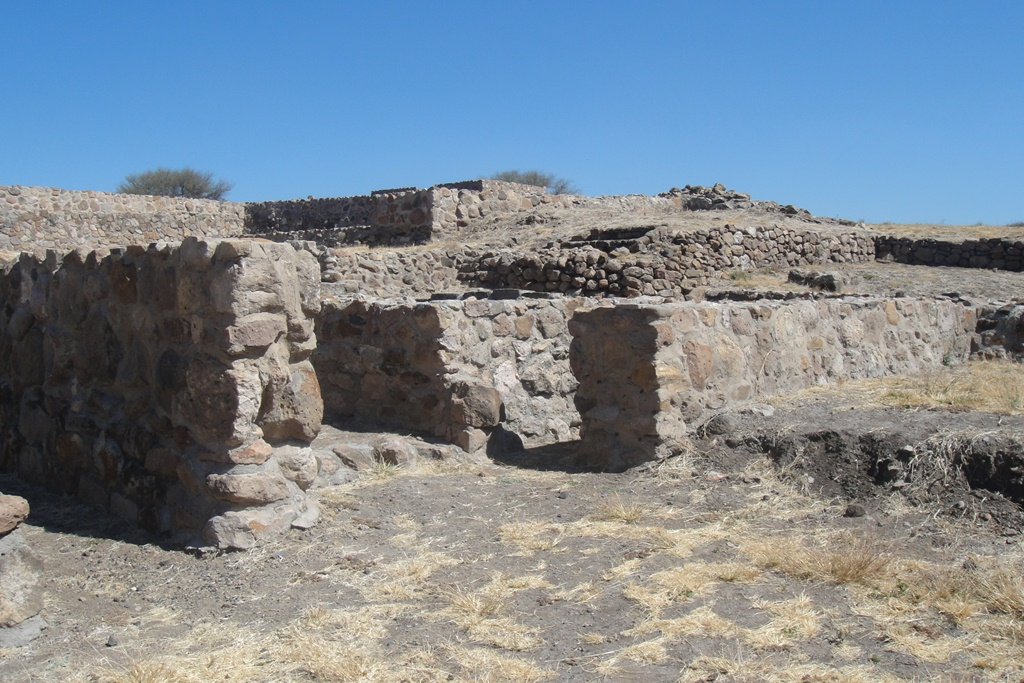
Main structure, viewed from the south west corner

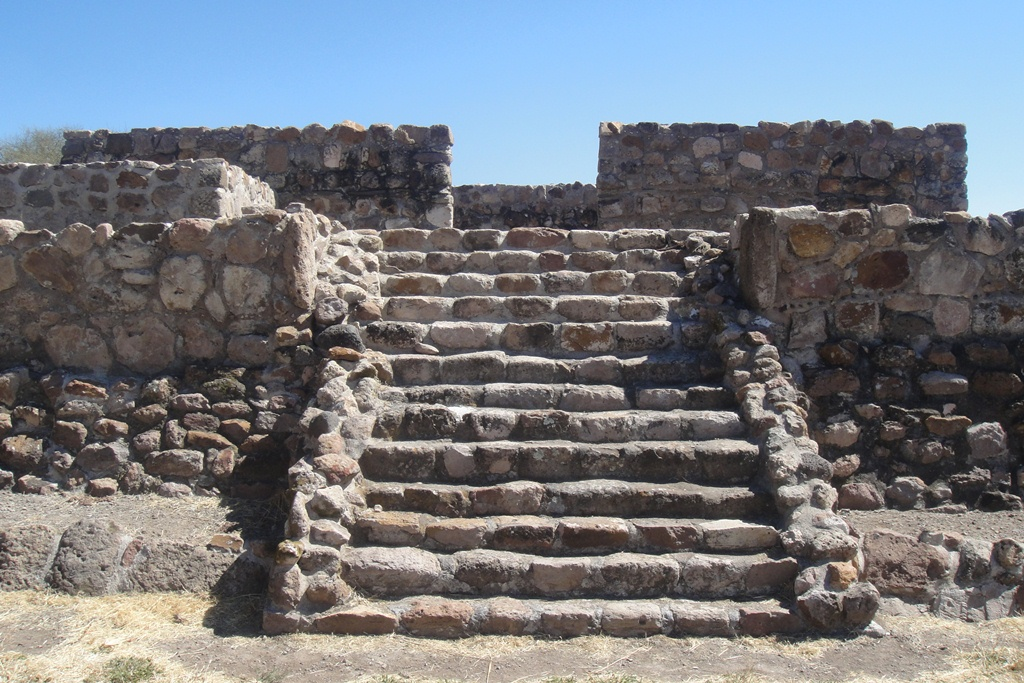
Access stairway to the temple from the west side, facing the sunken patio

The main structure, called as such for the sake of discussion, occupies the site north-west corner and it actually has four components, the sunken patio, small temple or altar to the north, a concentric circular basement and a Temple, east of the patio.

==== Sunken Patio ====
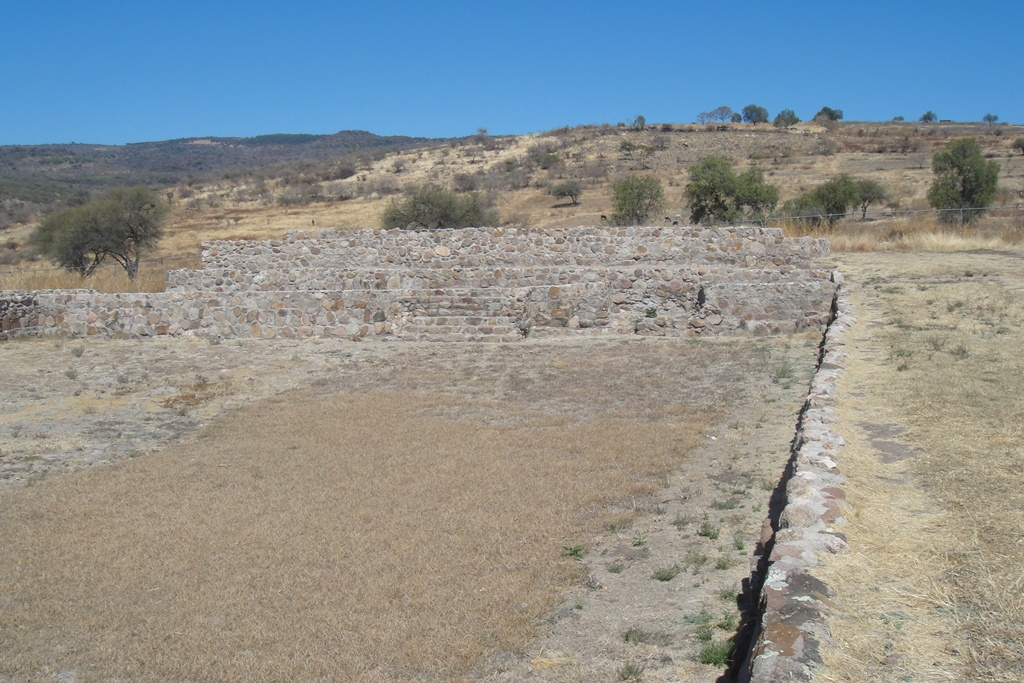
Sunken patio, viewed from its south eastern corner

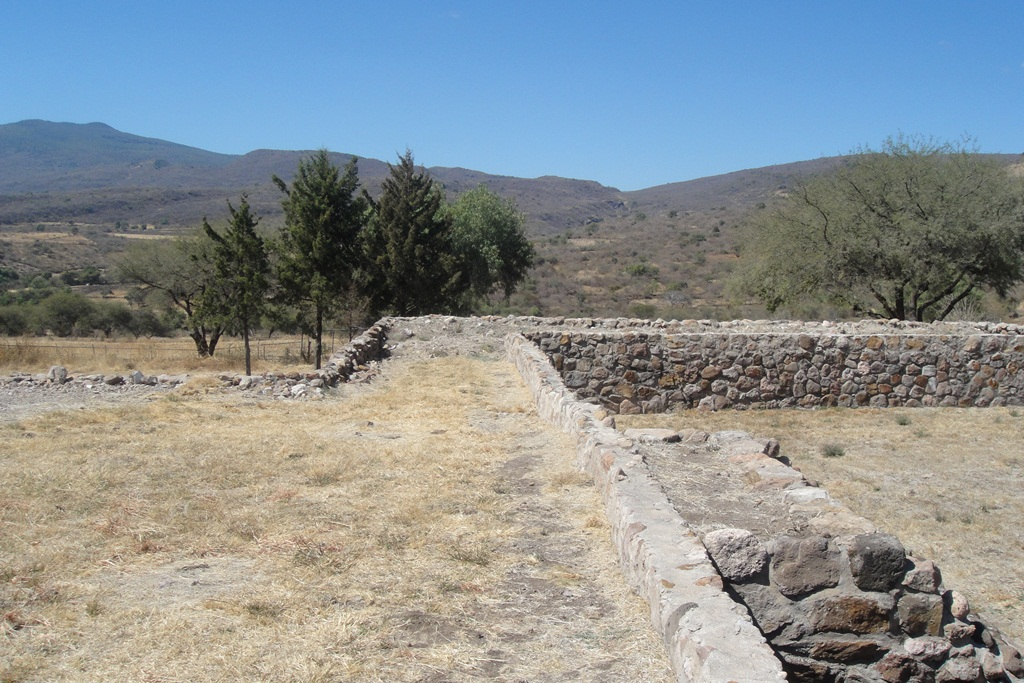
Detail of the south edge of the sunken patio, with the perimeter walk way and wall basement

The sunken patio (or plaza) is an irregularly shaped trapezoid, measures some 20 meters wide (65 ft.) on the south side, about 24 meters wide on the north side and it is about 30 meters (98 feet) long.

It is surrounded by a double wall, which might have been a perimeter walkway. It has access stairs at the center of both, the south and north sides.

Although it is not known what its purpose actually was, its size and depth, resembles a pool. It could have been a ceremonial pool.

==== Small Temple ====
The sunken patio, on its northern side, has a stairway leading to a structure with several level platforms and remains of a structure, which possibly was an altar, related to events taking place in the complex.

==== Concentric Circular basement ====
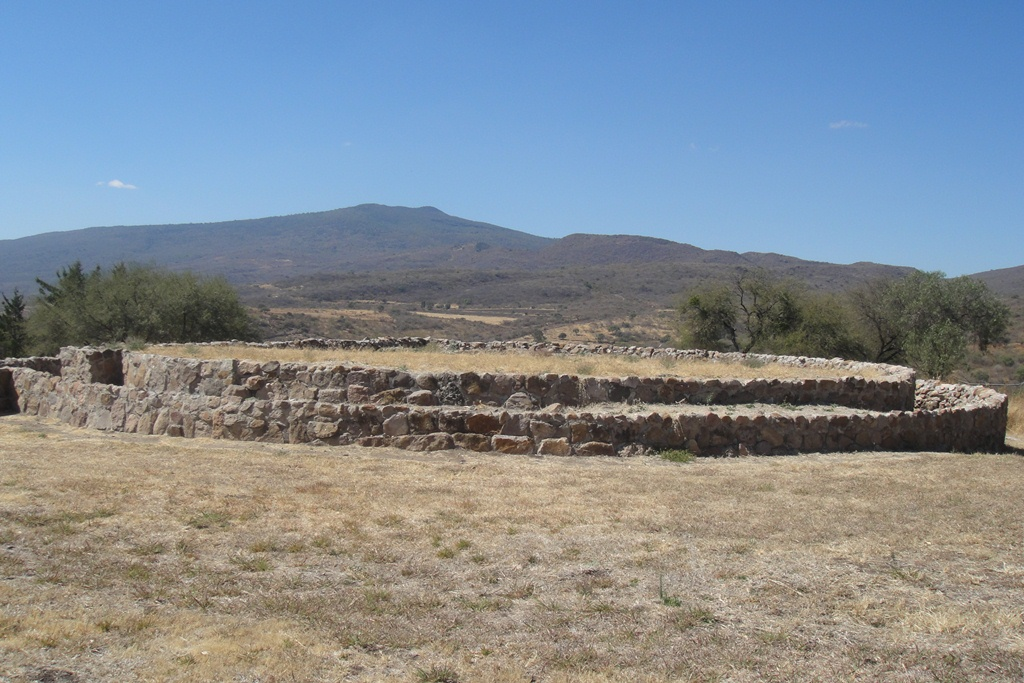
Concentric circular basement, north of the sunken patio

It is located at the northernmost edge of the sunken patio-altar complex. It consists of two concentric stone circles, the outer circle measuring about 20 meters (66 feet) in diameter, with no other visible structural remains. The circle is not complete, its south side, facing the altar is flat against the altar structure.

==== Temple ====
This temple was perhaps the most important component of the complex, it holds the highest position of the site, and its entrance faces west and the sunken patio. It has a series of passages or walled spaces on the eastern side and access stairways facing east and west.

The eastern side is somewhat destroyed, its stairway leads to the remains of an almost destroyed structure. At the foot of the structure, as part of the blocks forming the structure, a petroglyph, depicting an inverted human figure can be seen.

On the top of the temple, there were several covered and walled spaces used for unknown purposes.

=== Other structures ===
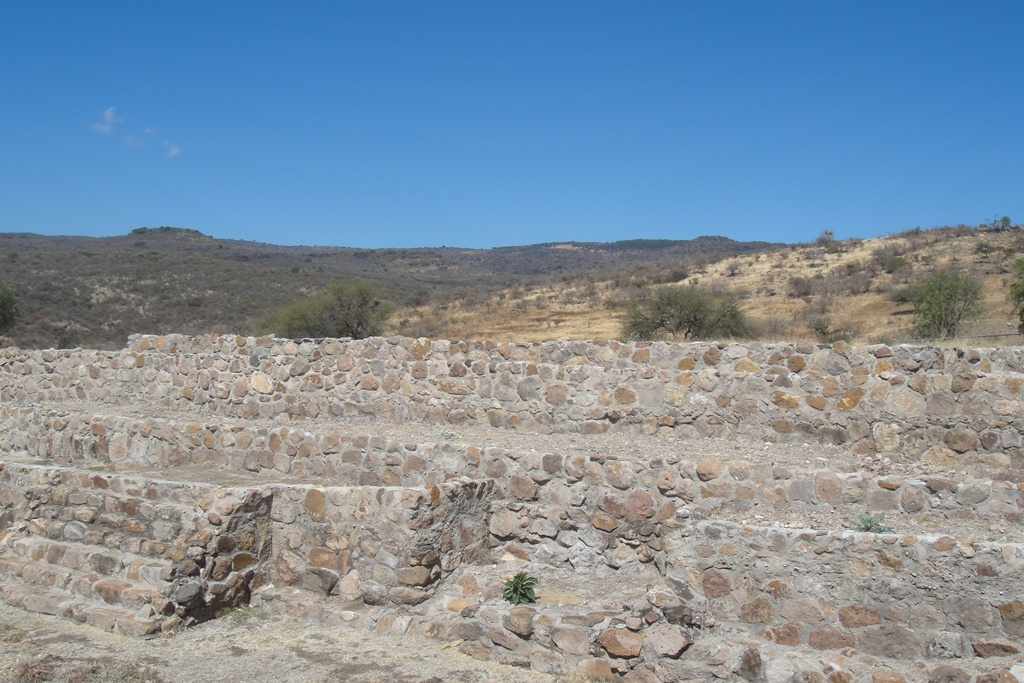
Detail of the north side of the sunken patio and temple

The balance of structures are irregularly shaped and are partly destroyed, hence it is difficult to assess their purpose or actual shape. There are apparent entrances, hall ways to private areas.

These structures were built on terraces and all surrounded by a perimeter wall, with different levels. Mostly were built on the southern side, overlooking the lake.

It is possible these were residential complexes, probably for high priests and governors of the city, heading ceremonies and events taking place at the complex.

== Other sites in Michoacán ==
The Michoacán archaeological sites are mostly ancient Purepecha settlements, as the culture evolved in the entity and had political, administrative and religious headquarters in the region. Among the most important and visible sites are Tzintzuntzan and Ihuatzio in the region Lake Pátzcuaro; Huandacareo and Tres Cerritos in the Lake Cuitzeo region; as well as San Felipe Alzati in the Zitácuaro region.

In addition, there are sites related to other prehispanic cultures, such as Tingambato or El Opeño archaeological sites area in the Jacona de Plancarte municipality, with important funerary remains hitherto considered the most ancient Mesoamerican tombs. More archaeological sites are being discovered, such as the city of La Piedad, in the Zaragoza area, where several remains have been found and are being explored.

== Bibliography ==
- Fray Jerónimo de Alcalá Relación de Michoacán (in Spanish)
- Andrews, J. Richard (2003). Introduction to Classical Nahuatl (Revised ed.). Norman: University of Oklahoma Press.
- Gradie, Charlotte M. (1994). "Discovering the Chichimeca". Americas. 51 (1). The Americas, Vol. 51, No. 1: 67–88. doi:10.2307/1008356. JSTOR 1008356. S2CID 145002405.
- Karttunen, Frances (1983). An Analytical Dictionary of Nahuatl. Austin: University of Texas Press.
- Lockhart, James (2001). Nahuatl as Written. Stanford University Press.
- Lumholtz, Carl (1987) [1900]. Unknown Mexico, Explorations in the Sierra Madre and Other Regions, 1890-1898. 2 vols (reprint ed.). New York: Dover Publications. * Powell, Philip Wayne (1969). Soldiers, Indians, & Silver: The Northward Advance of New Spain, 1550-1600. Berkeley, CA: University of California Press.
- Secretaria de Turismo del Estado de Zacatecas (2005). "Zonas Arqueológicas" (in Spanish). Archived from the original on 2005-12-07.
- Smith, Michael E. (1984). "The Aztlan Migrations of Nahuatl Chronicles: Myth or History?" (PDF online facsimile). Ethnohistory. 31 (3). Columbus, OH: American Society for Ethnohistory: 153–186. doi:10.2307/482619. ISSN 0014-1801. JSTOR 482619. OCLC 145142543.
- Andrews, J. Richard (2003). Introduction to Classical Nahuatl (Revised ed.). Norman: University of Oklahoma Press.
- Gradie, Charlotte M. (1994). "Discovering the Chichimeca". Americas. 51 (1). The Americas, Vol. 51, No. 1: 67–88. doi:10.2307/1008356. JSTOR 1008356. S2CID 145002405.
