= Barajas =

Barajas may refer to:

- Barajas (Madrid), the district of Madrid in which the airport lies
  - Barajas (Madrid Metro), station along Line 8 of the Madrid Metro
  - Adolfo Suárez Madrid–Barajas Airport, principal airport of Madrid, Spain
- Barajas (archaeological site), in Pénjamo, Guanajuato, Mexico
- Rod Barajas (born 1975), American baseball player

== See also ==
- Castillo San Felipe de Barajas, in Cartagena de Indias
