= Plazuelas =

Prehispanic archaeological site in Mexico

Plazuelas Archaeological Site
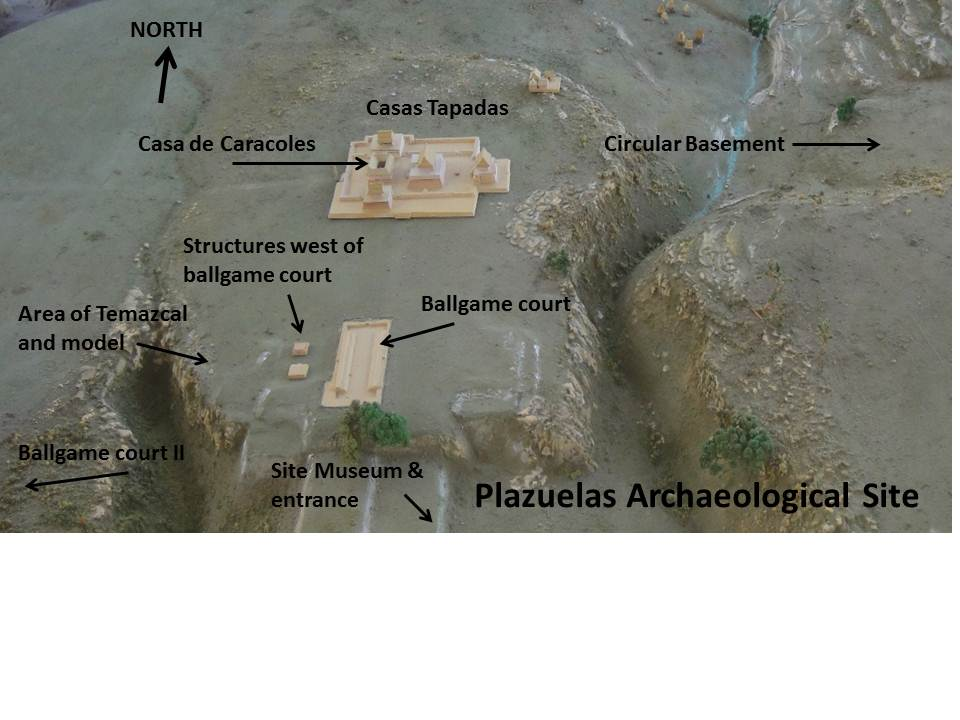
- Edited photograph of the site museum model, depicting structure arrangement
- Interactive map of Plazuelas Archaeological Site
- 20°24′12″N 101°49′38″W
- Type: Mesoamerican archaeology
- Periods: Mesoamerican Classical – Postclassical
- Cultures: Chichimec
- Location: San Juan el Alto, Municipality of Penjamo, Guanajuato, Mexico
- Region: Mesoamerica

History
- Built: 600–900 CE

Site notes
- Website: Plazuelas Archaeological site

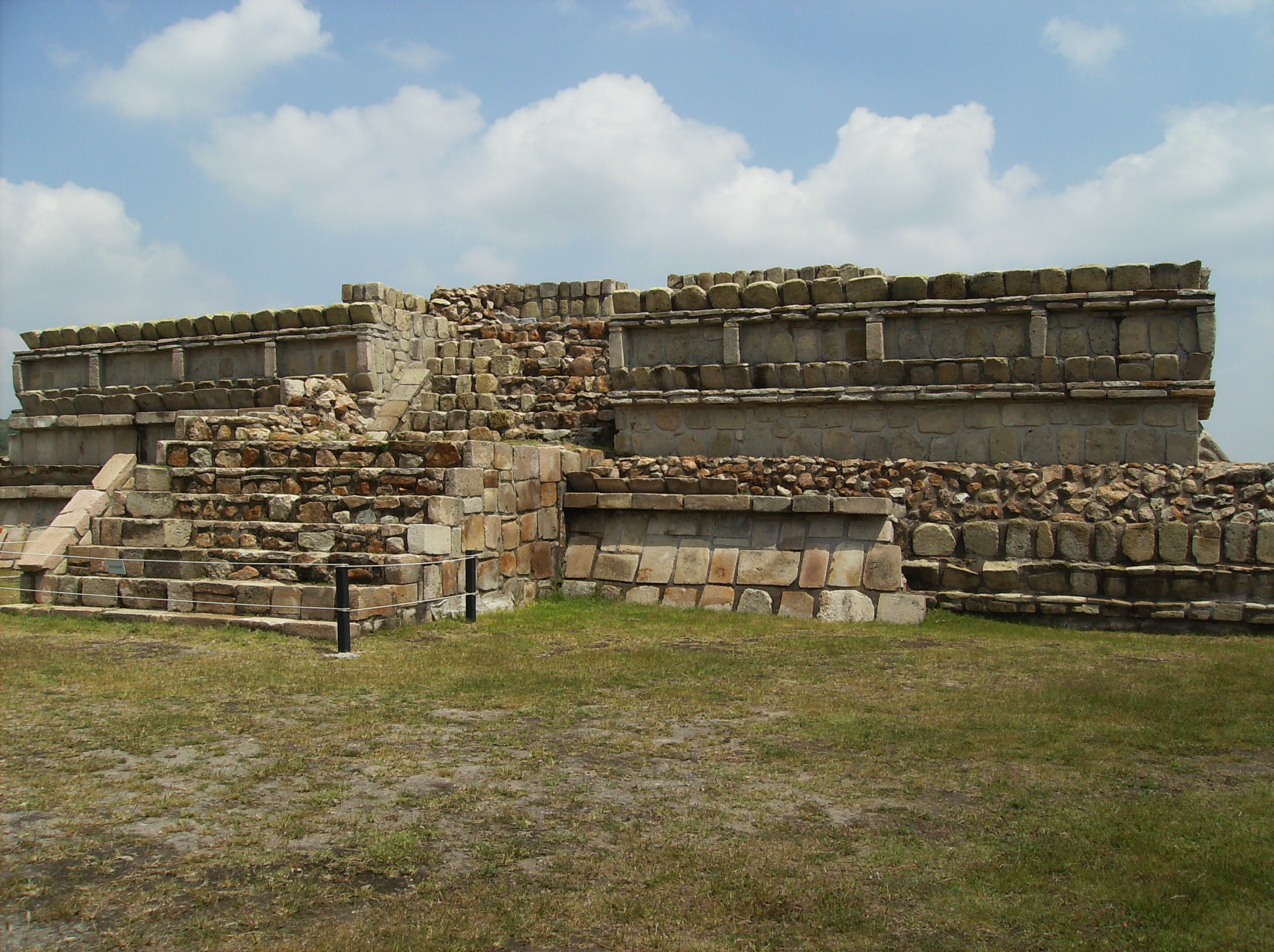
Plazuelas

Plazuelas is a prehispanic archaeological site located just north of San Juan el Alto, some 2.7 kilometers (1.7 miles) north of federal highway 90 (Pénjamo-Guadalajara), and about 11 kilometers (6.8 miles) west of the city of Pénjamo in the state of Guanajuato, Mexico. The site is open to the public; it is dominated by a large, rectangular plaza with several pyramidal structures and platforms, along with a massive ball court. To the north of the structures is a field of boulders with thousands of glyphs carved into them.

The original settlement was considerably larger, with a large, circular structure called El Cajete marking its eastern extent.

According to INAH, site remains and evidence confirm the influence of many cultures merging on this site, although it is not certainly known who constructed this city, INAH believes the hunter-gatherer Chichimecas inhabited the Bajio region at the end of the postclassical period, and that many other sedentary cultures lived here before, but these cultures are not mentioned nor identified.

Plazuelas (600–900 CE) is located in the same municipality as the site of Barajas (? – 1000 CE) and some 46 kilometers (29 miles) west of Peralta (100 – 900 CE). These three cities were all settled in the Mesoamerican classic period, hence it is possible that they shared constructors, inhabitants, religion, governments and traded as part of a common "Bajio Tradition".

Very little is known about these societies inhabiting the Bajio Region, they are thought to have been members of hunter-gatherer, fishing Chichimec groups, it is now known that these places were trading confluence routes between central Mexico with northern and western Mesoamerica.

Over 1400 years ago, in addition to Plazuelas, there were other five known important cities in the region; San Bartolome (Tzchté), San Miguel Viejo, Tepozán, Loza Los Padres and Peralta (Mesoamerican site). Circular structures confirm the Tradition constant ancient relations with other civilizations. Circular structures are common across prehispanic Mesoamerica.

== Background ==
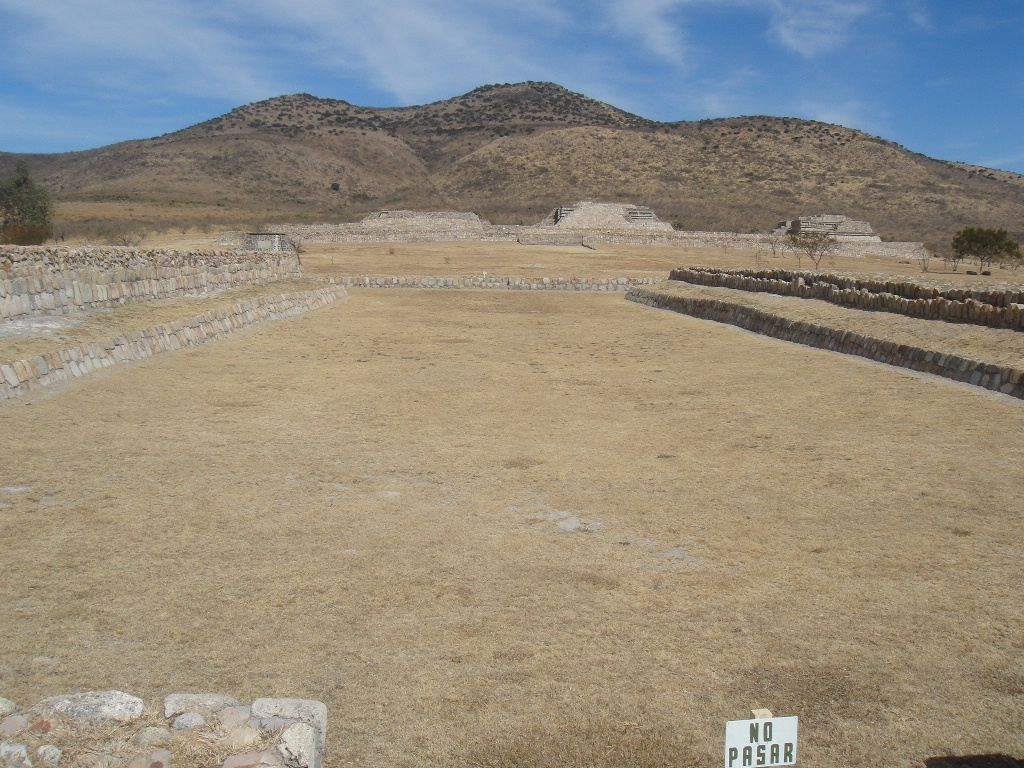
Ballgame court viewed from the south

The area north of the Lerma River, is presumed to have been originally occupied by hunter-gatherer nomadic groups, the surrounding area city construction was probably made by late occupants. Characteristics indicate that these constructions were sedentary establishments. Lifestyles and social characteristics follow the Mesoamerican model. It is estimated that the site was abandoned around year 1000 CE.

In prehispanic times, the Bajio region saw the most human development due to the fertility of the soil and the presence of surface water for agriculture. The oldest group to inhabit the area are called the Chupícuarios, who dominated the center of the Bajío area and were active in between 800 BCE and 300 CE. Their largest city is now the site called Chupícuaro, and their influence was widespread being found in the modern states of Zacatecas, Querétaro, Colima, Nayarit, Hidalgo, State of Mexico, Michoacán and Guerrero. Chupícuaro cities were associated with the Toltec city of Tula and when this city fell, these agricultural cities of Guanajuato also went into decline. This and a prolonged drought cause these cities to be abandoned between the 10th and 11th centuries with only the Guamares left ethnically.

Then Chichimeca and other nomadic groups entered the area. These nomadic indigenous groups are generically referred to as Chichimeca, but in reality they were a variety of ethnicities such as the Guachichiles, Pames and Zacatecos. These groups were warriors, semi nomadic and did not practice significant agriculture, nor did they construct cities. Part of the state was also inhabited by the Otomi but they were mostly displaced or dominated by the Purépecha in the southwest and the Chichimeca in other parts. By the 16th century, most of Mesoamerica was dominated by either the Aztec Empire or Purépecha Empire, but Guanajuato was under the control of neither. It was on the northern border of the Purépecha Empire with southern Guanajuato showing significant cultural influence in the southern valleys, and Aztecs had ventured into the area looking for minerals. However, most of the state was dominated by various Chichimeca tribes as part of what the Spanish would call the "Gran Chichimeca". These Chichimeca were mostly nomadic with some scattered agricultural communities, mostly in the north.

Northern Mexico has been studied by Pedro Armillas (1964, 1969), Braniff (1989, 1994). More recent archaeological has been made by France, with research periods in 1998, 1999 and 2000.

=== Bajio Tradition ===
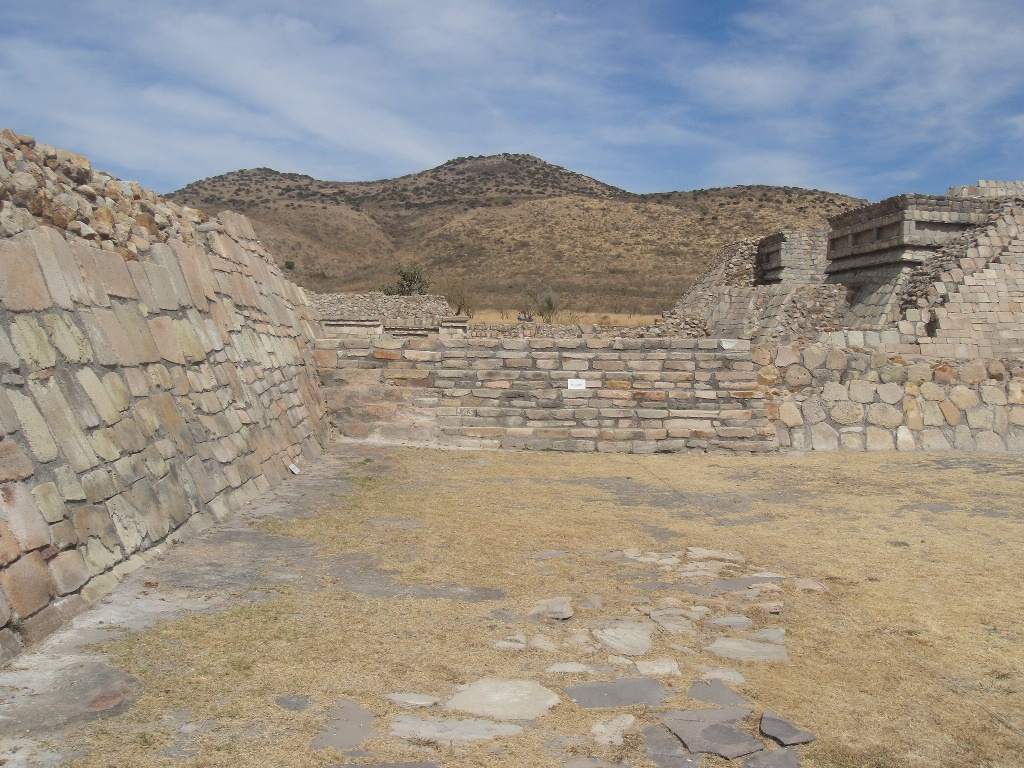
Casas Tapadas complex, southern entrance

Not too long ago, the Bajio Region and a good part of the Mexican central plateau were considered of little archaeological interest. Little was known of native regional societies, beyond the historical data describing an almost uninhabited area two centuries before the conquest.

Data from historical documents indicated that the prehispanic Bajio inhabitants were only Chichimeca, nomadic groups with appropriation economies and belligerents. By 1972, Beatriz Braniff began to explain the Bajio cultures and proposed the contours of a "marginal" region of Mesoamerica, located on the edges of the high cultured regions The apparent influence of large Mesoamerican cities, mainly Teotihuacan in regional development, also departed from the academic debate the possibility of identifying and explaining the specific role played by local societies in the Mesoamerican development.

During the last ten years, archaeological studies have had a major boost in Guanajuato, and several myths of the Bajio past became truth, have provided better founded explanations based on the prehispanic life in this geographic area.

Three aspects seem fundamental: a) the Bajio as an important part of the Mesoamerican universe was a trade communication region and a link between three the cultural areas proposed by Paul Kirchhoff (1967): Central, North and West Mexico; b) theories based on influences determination from major population centers, has now been replaced by understanding the interactions and bi-directional relationships, where the implications of local societies such as Peralta have barely been addressed but no doubt will continue to investigate; c) during the mesoamerican classical period, between 300 and 700 CE, the Bajio developed a notable agricultural population, with a social and political organization structure, in addition to its deep regional cultural roots, that has been identified as the Bajio tradition.

=== Chichimeca ===
Chichimeca was the name that the Nahua peoples of Mexico generically applied to a wide range of semi-nomadic peoples who inhabited the north of modern-day Mexico and southwestern United States, and carried the same sense as the European term "barbarian". The name was adopted with a pejorative tone by the Spaniards when referring especially to the semi-nomadic hunter-gatherer peoples of northern Mexico. In modern times only one ethnic group is customarily referred to as Chichimecs, namely the Chichimeca Jonaz, although lately this usage is being changed for simply "Jonáz" or their own name for themselves "Úza".

The Chichimeca peoples were in fact many different groups with varying ethnic and linguistic affiliations. As the Spaniards worked towards consolidating the rule of New Spain over the Mexican indigenous peoples during the sixteenth and seventeenth centuries, the "Chichimecan tribes" maintained a resistance. A number of ethnic groups of the region allied against the Spanish, and the following military colonization of northern Mexico has become known as the "Chichimeca Wars".

Many of the peoples called Chichimeca are virtually unknown today; few descriptions mention them and they seem to have been absorbed into mestizo culture or into other indigenous ethnic groups. For example, virtually nothing is known about the peoples referred to as Guachichiles, Caxcanes, Zacatecos, Tecuexes, or Guamares. Others like the Opata or "Eudeve" are well described but extinct as a people.

Other "Chichimec" peoples maintain a separate identity into the present day, for example the Otomies, Chichimeca Jonaz, Coras, Huicholes, Pames, Yaquis, Mayos, O'odham and the Tepehuánes.

The first description of a modern objective ethnography of the peoples inhabiting La Gran Chichimeca was done by Norwegian naturalist and explorer Carl Sofus Lumholtz in 1890 when he traveled on mule through northwestern Mexico, meeting the indigenous peoples on friendly terms. With his descriptions of the rich and different cultures of the various "uncivilized" tribes, the picture of the uniform Chichimec barbarians was changed, although in Mexican Spanish the word "Chichimeca" remains connected to an image of "savagery".

The historian Paul Kirchhoff, in his work "The Hunting-Gathering People of North Mexico," described the Chichimecas as sharing a hunter-gatherer culture, based on the gathering of mesquite, agave, and tunas (the fruit of the nopal). While others also lived off of acorns, roots and seeds. In some areas, the Chichimecas cultivated maize and calabash. From the mesquite, the Chichimecas made white bread and wine. Many Chichimec tribes utilized the juice of the agave as a substitute for water when it was in short supply.

== The site ==
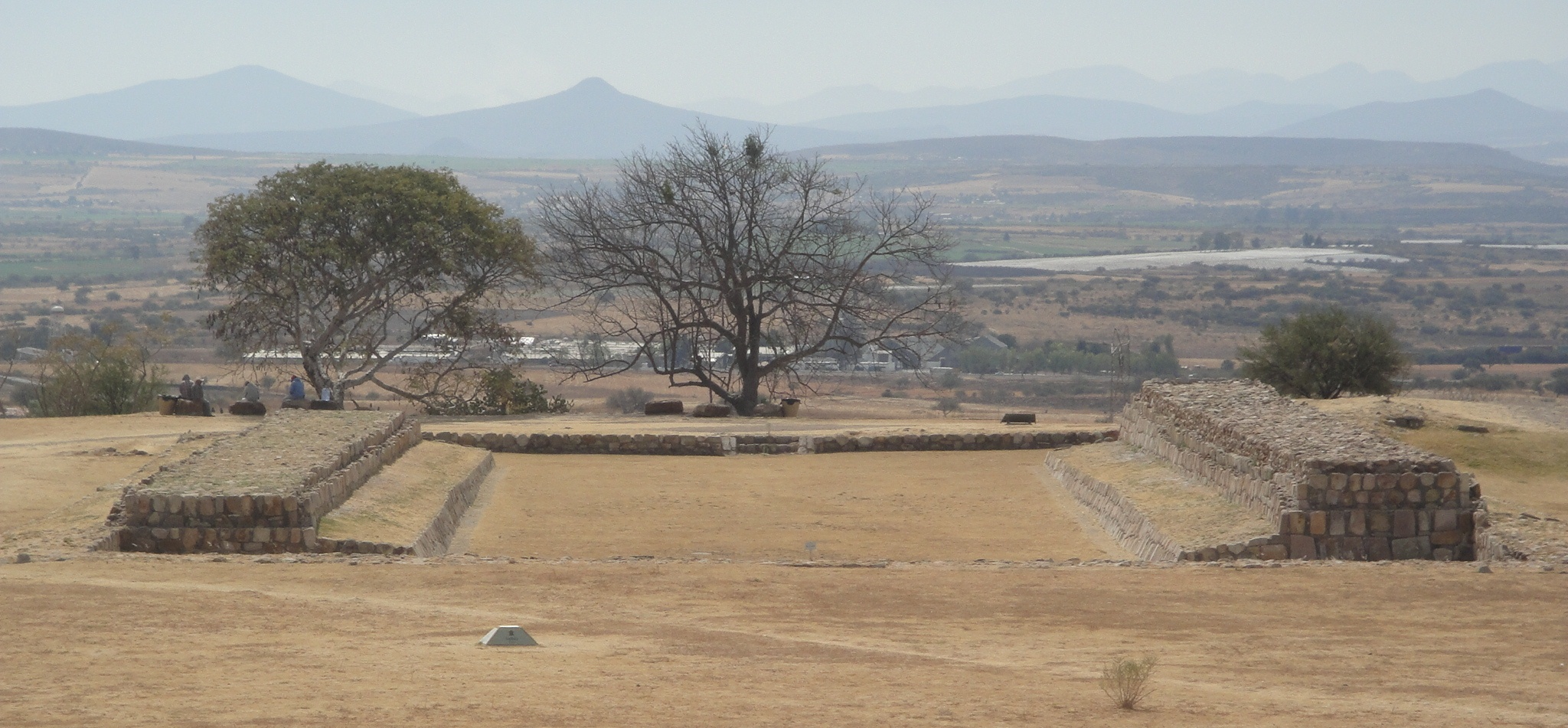
Ballgame court viewed from the north, the valley on the far south

The site was built over an artificial plateau, comprising a civic-religious complex and a ballgame court on the southern side. The structure complex known as Casas Tapadas comprises four buildings, a palace and a small altar bordered by a thick wall with a seating bench on the inside. There are several accesses, with a main access on the west side. A Large road leads to this entrance.

The place is believed to have worshiped gods representing water, earth, fire and wind. This worship is depicted in the architectonic manifestations, sculptures and ornamental articles found. Rays, clouds, serpents, snails and spirals are symbols represented in stone glyphs, and structures.

Plazuelas was built over three hill sides, divided by two ravines, overlooking a large valley to the south.

The eastern ravine has a water spring, considered the main water source, while western ravine, known as "Los Cuijes" only has seasonal rain water.

It can be said that the plateau where the site was constructed is surrounded by natural ravines in three sides (east, north and west), some deeper than others, the southern side, where the access to the site is located, is composed by a smooth slope towards the valley.

The esplanade to the west has remains of a second ballgame court, and possibly other remains, yet to be explored.

The central esplanade contains five buildings; it is believed to have represented the larger construction effort, in leveling the terrain. The buildings are the Casas Tapadas Complex, a ballgame court to the south, two structures just west of the court, a Temazcal and a large concentration of petroglyphs at the northern and western edges of the esplanade.

An interesting consideration is that the main three structures at Casas Tapadas, resemble three hills on the background and would seem to have been purposely aligned. See photograph.

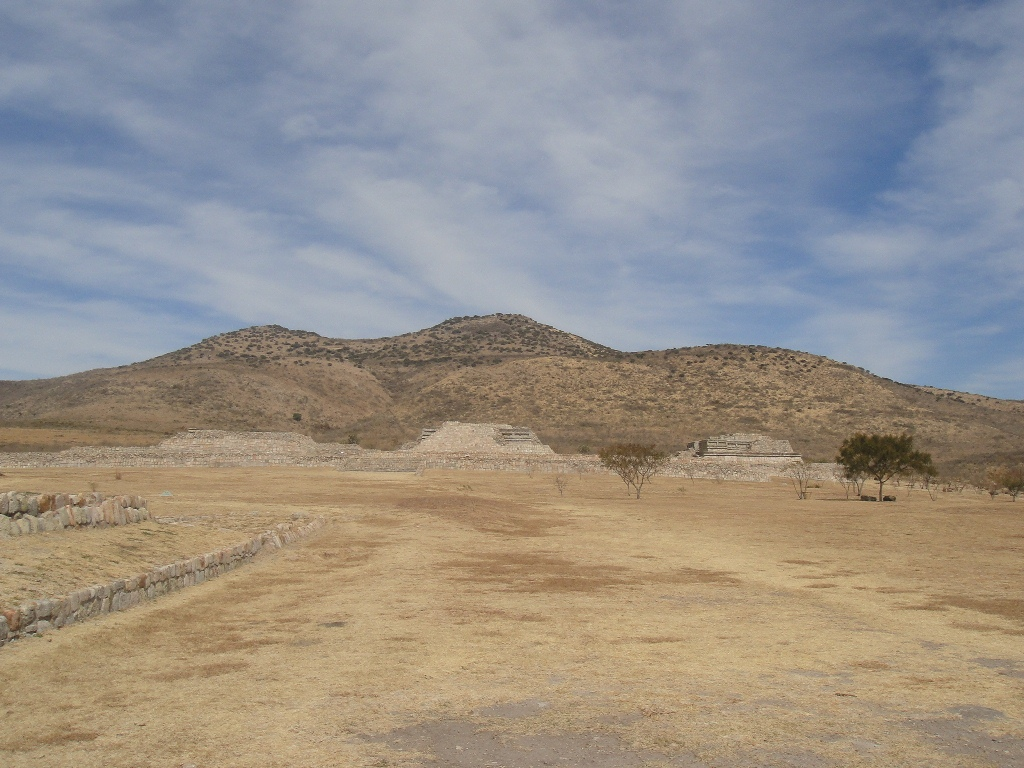
Casas Tapadas Complex, against hills on the background

The eastern esplanade has an unexplored circular basement.

The site structures seem to be aligned north south with a few degree deviation to the east.

== Structures ==
Casas Tapadas and the ballgame court to the south are connected by a 220-meter (720-foot) long road

The building decoration depicts the stylized motif of "atadura de años" (bundle of years), the design was modified in several occasions to commemorate the end of a life cycle. It is also depicted in ray shaped sculptures ornamenting the eastern pyramid.

=== Casas Tapadas ===
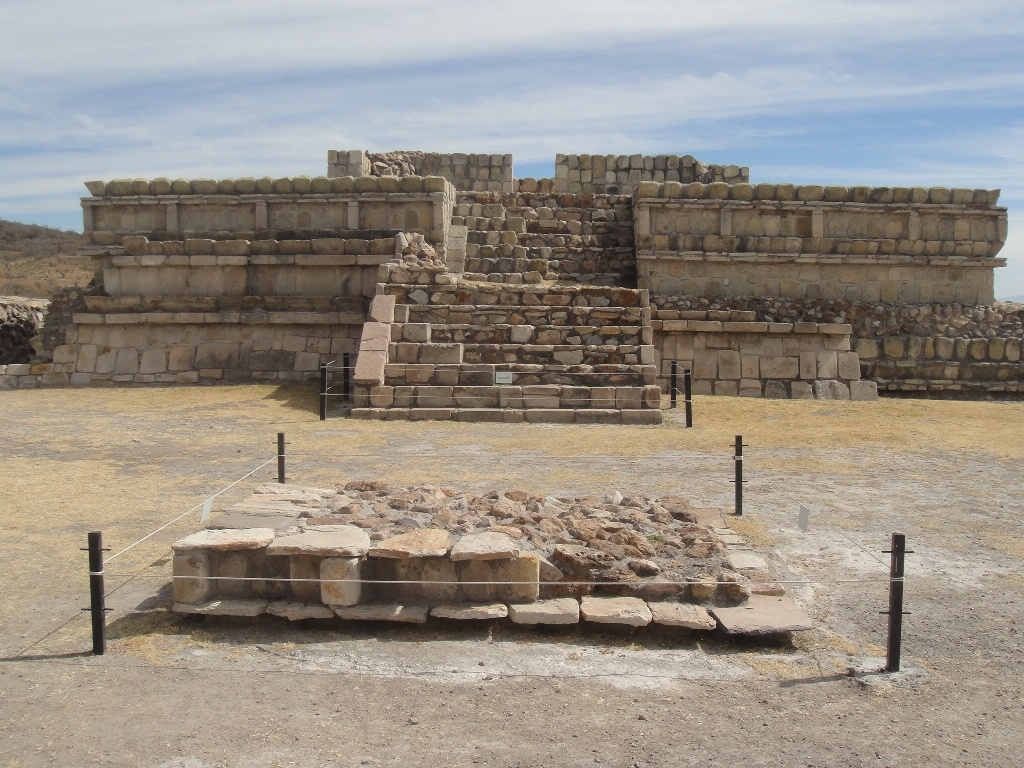
Eastern structure, small altar in front

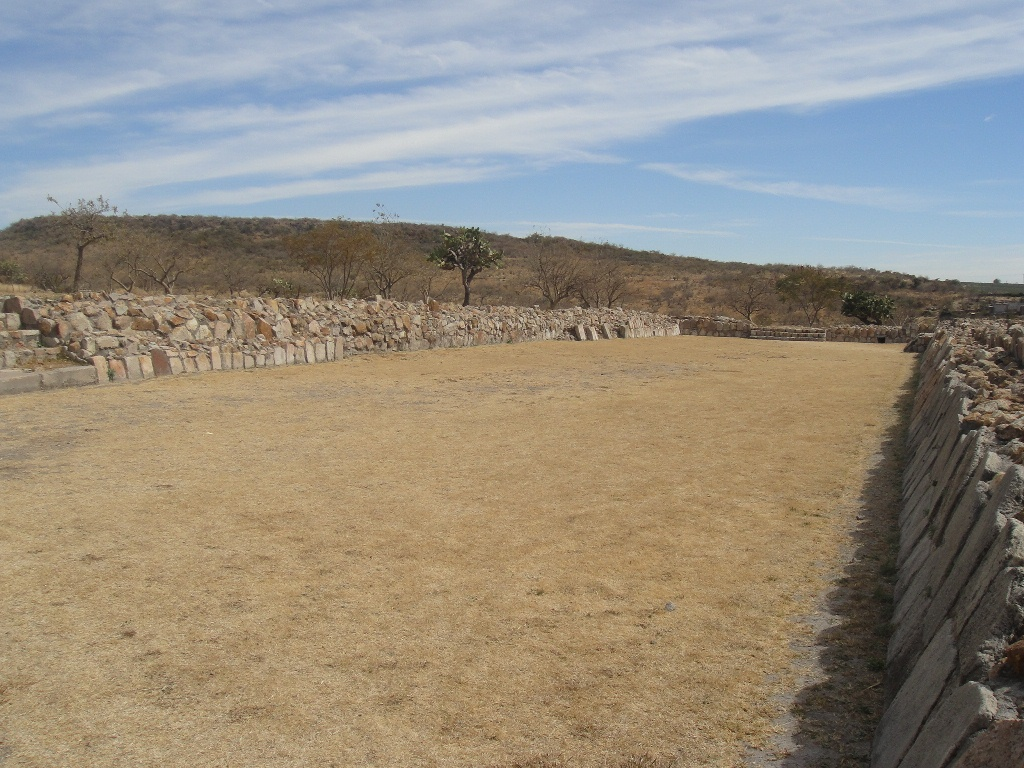
Large structure at the north-east corner of Casas Tapadas, entrances on the south and northern sides

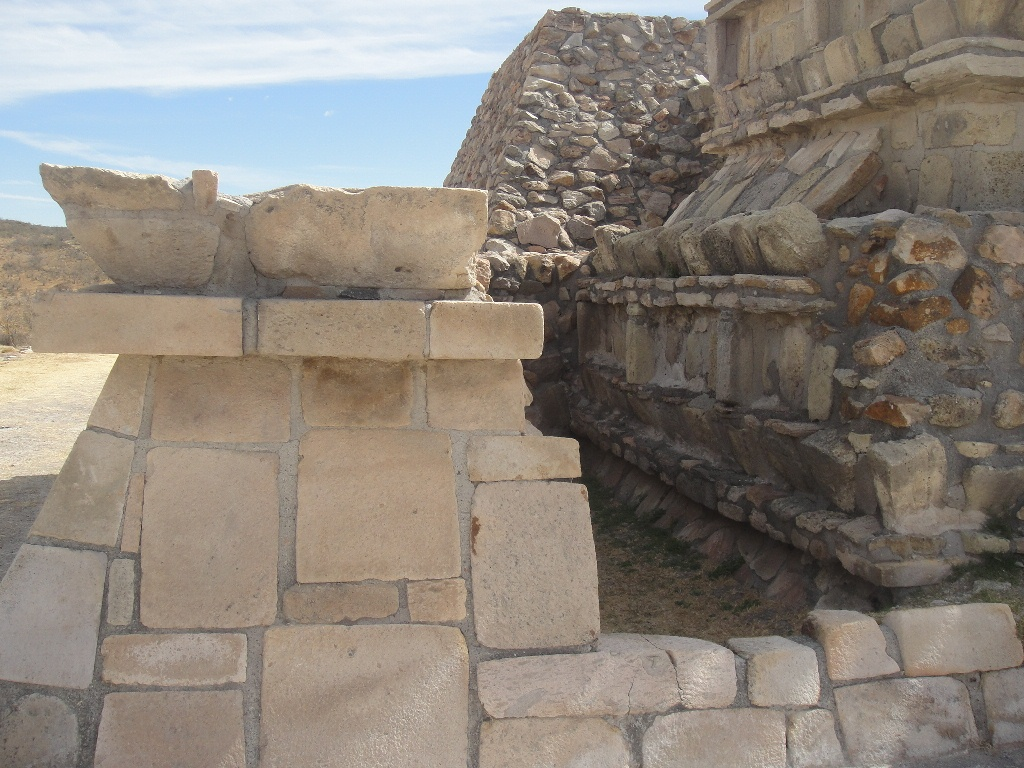
Detail of constructive stages, eastern structure, north–west corner

The complex was built over a large rectangular platform oriented east–west, measuring approximately 132 by 89 meters (433 by 292 ft) over which several structures were built, three main structures are aligned east – west.

The complex has a perimeter wall with a large walkway built into the interior facade, interrupted by seven entrances: three to the north, three to the south and one to the west.

The site contains a traditional Bajio element, known as a sunken patio, as it is located at a lower level within the complex.

The complex had several expansions, to the north by a square patio at the west side and to the south by a rectangular patio at the eastern end, communicated by a hall way parallel to the basement. This expansion communicates with the exterior by four stairways. To the south, because of the terrain level contour, the expansion forms a large terrace similar to the northern expansion, and on the center of the south side has a stairway that leads onto the road that connects with the ballgame court.

The north and south basements were modified three times, when originally built they had certain symmetry, with an overhang decoration over the wall sides, it became more complex on the second stage of the north basement, while on the south basement it was simpler; in both cases, a stone slab holds most of the ornament weight.

During the third constructive stage the building design changes completely, to the south, the building design is very basic, the walls has no ornaments, while the northern side the structure is conformed by large engraved self-supported stones, supporting the stone slabs weight.

The structure has rather rare elements in Guanajuato. The architectonic layout is T-shaped and unfortunately was found in bad conditions; apparently was destroyed towards its decline (900 CE). The profile of its perimeter wall also has the northern structure monolithic stones and among the remains are large engraved stones depicting cut spirals that most have been part of the structure. Inside are traces of a wall that possibly divided the space, covered with a clay floor, probably remains of two small patios.

The main Access to Casas Tapadas is by a road limited by low walls on the western side. On the northern side there are several steps that indicate a straight line smooth route down towards the water spring.

=== Caracoles ===
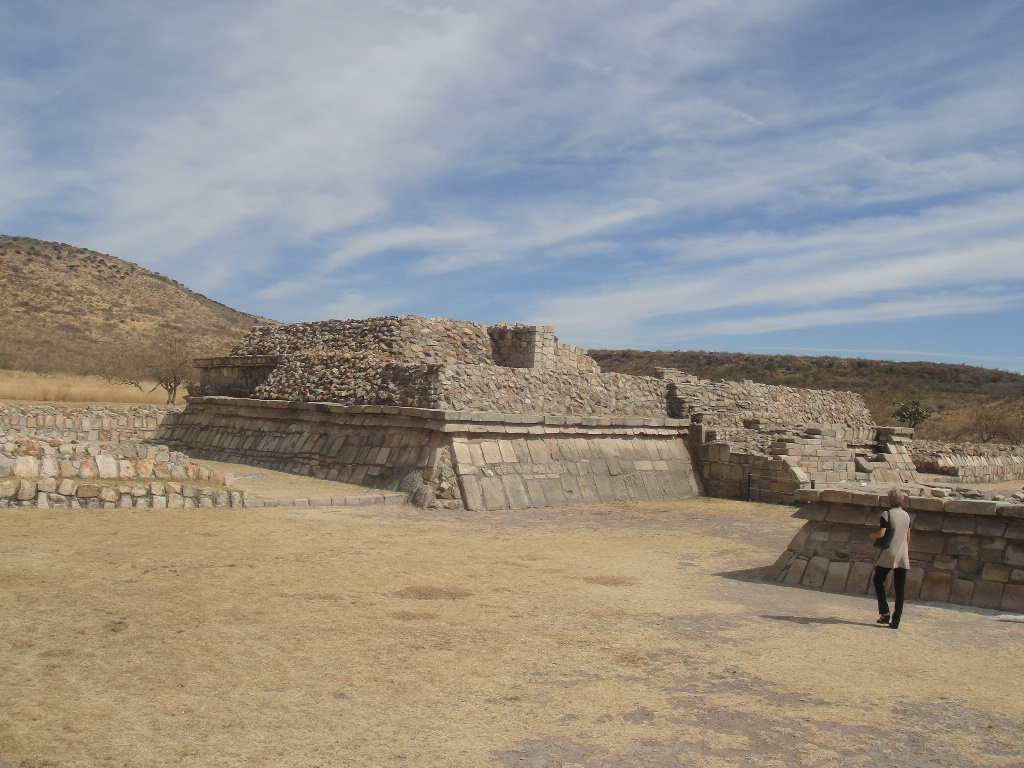
Caracoles

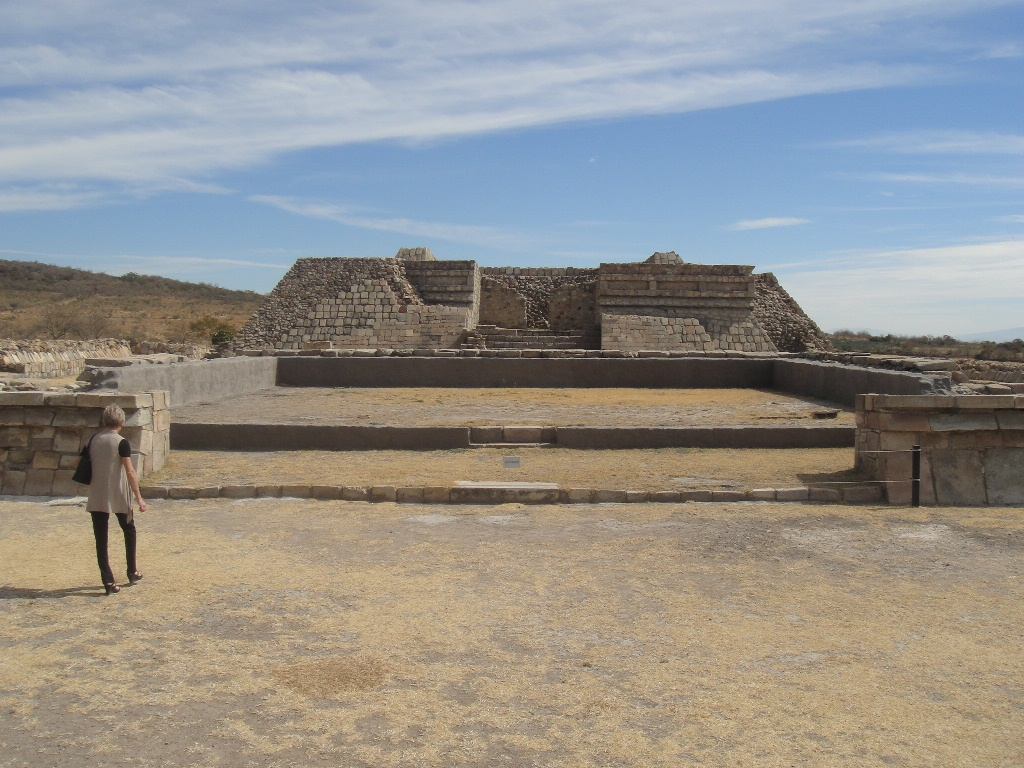
Eastern view Caracoles and Casas Tapadas

This structure is actually part of the Casas Tapadas complex, it is called "Caracoles", because of spiral figures found as part of the structure ornament.

The building on the back contained carved stones with lightning representations and the year symbol, over a cane bundle. Possibly in memory of an important event or the beginning of a new 52-year cycle.

In addition to its political function, it was probably dedicated to the earth, by the inverted T shape related to the underworld. Its walls contain carved stones with a cut spiral.

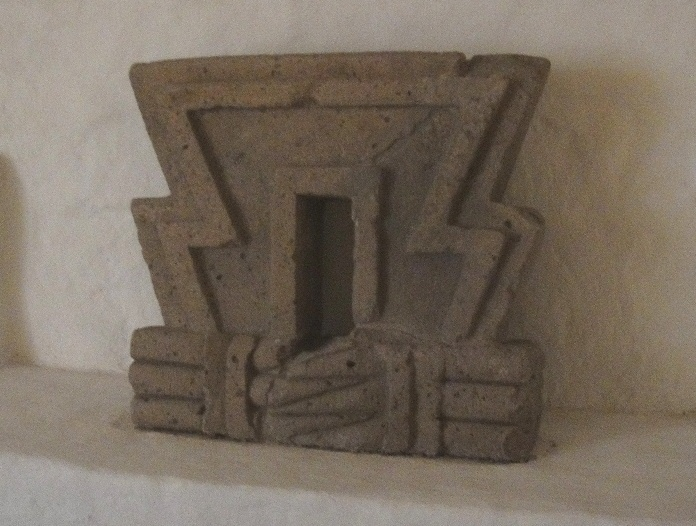
Structure ornament, representation of lightning and "year bundle" at the bottom

=== Circular basement ===
A circular formation with a 48-meter (157-foot) diameter is located some 624 meters (2,047 feet) east of the Casas Tapadas complex, over the eastern ravine, previously believed to be somehow part of the Circular Building Tradition of Teuchitlán, Jalisco on the Guachimontones three pyramidal basements conforming an open plaza and subtle terraces. However, research on the ground proved that this structure was actually a pile of rocks and debris created more recently by farming equipment, which is corroborated by the structure's presence on a contemporary farm.

=== Ballgame court ===
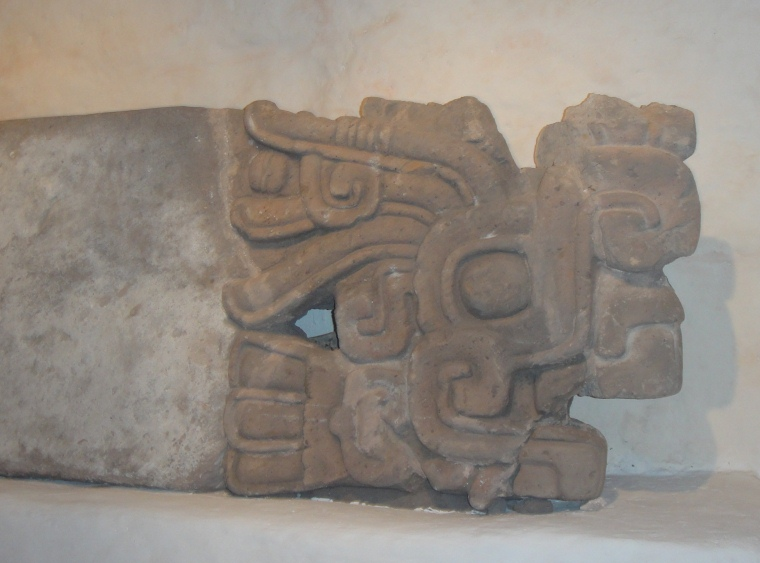
Ballgame marker, currently located at the site Museum

The structure is the first architectural element seen upon entering the site, with Casas Tapadas in the background to the north.

The structure has bigger constructions on the western side, while walls on the eastern side are lower, both sides possibly had stands for spectators attending the game.

The ballgame court is I-shaped, measuring some 65 by 31 meters (213 by 102 ft)

It presumably had a religious sense, it is believed that the game purpose was to assure the victorious rising of the sun every morning, with renewed energy to provide life on earth.

In the four corners of the court were found sculptures representing a serpents and at the center, as marker a serpent-lizard.

These mythological serpent presentations were offerings at the ballgame courts and also share features of the rain god and lightning. The claws below and the headdress displayed towards the back, symbolizes the power of nature elements.

The marker found at the eastern side of the court, depicts attributes of the ancient rain gods, reiterating their association with fertility. This is expressed by the feather headdress, eye circles, the spiral depicting a mouth, the coiled nose, gums with teeth and the lower jaw.

=== Ballgame ceremonial structures ===
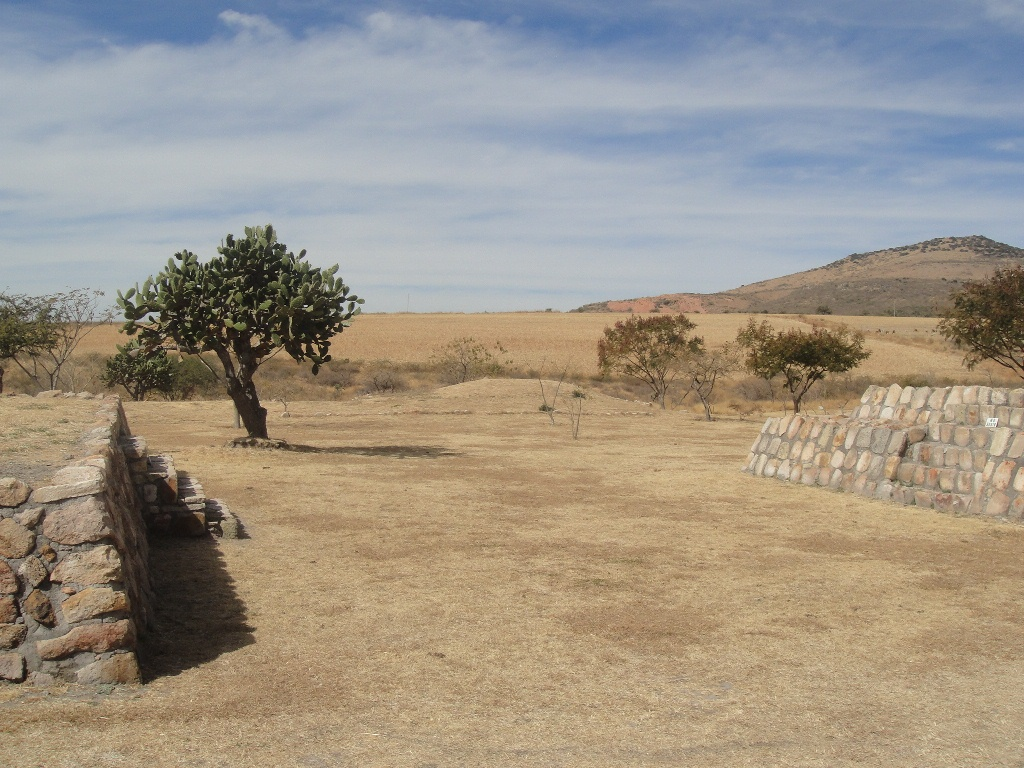
Structures west of the ballgame court, the view is looking west

These two square structures sit just west of the ballgame court, hence it is assumed they were related to the game, probably with ceremonial purposes, following the ritual bath at the Temazcal structure, further to the west.

Notice the opposing steps into the structures; the structure on the south (left on the photograph) has protruding steps, while the structure to the right has recessed steps.

=== Temazcal ===
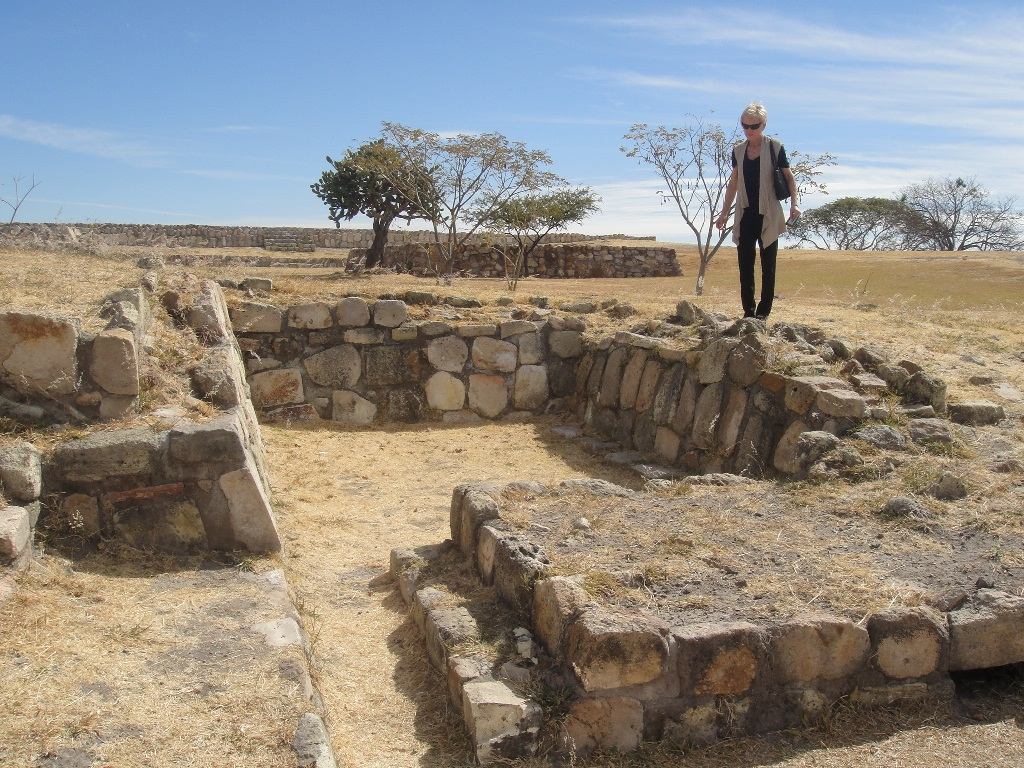
Temazcal remains, view from the west; see the ceremonial structures to the east and the ballgame court at the background

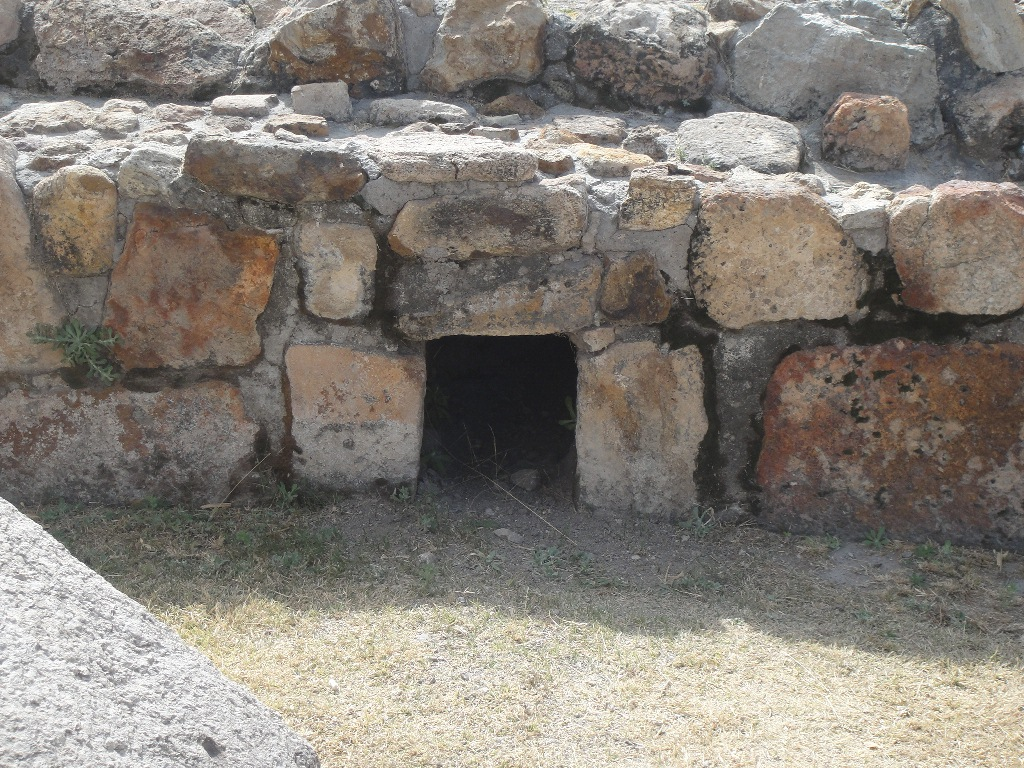
View of the Temazcal drainage, viowed from the inside of the structure

To the west of the ballgame court (and ceremonial structures) is a Temazcal or ceremonial bath house, were players probably took purifying baths, before the ceremonial game.

=== Petroglyphs ===
There are apparently two main zones with many petroglyphs, one to the east of the ball game, near the Temazcal and another more important section to the north.

The petroglyphs were engraved on the surface of igneous rock outgrowths, by natives, in high and low relief, holes, circles, dotted lines, continuous lines, spiral, concentric circles, zoomorphic figures, planes and isolated building models and complex sites.

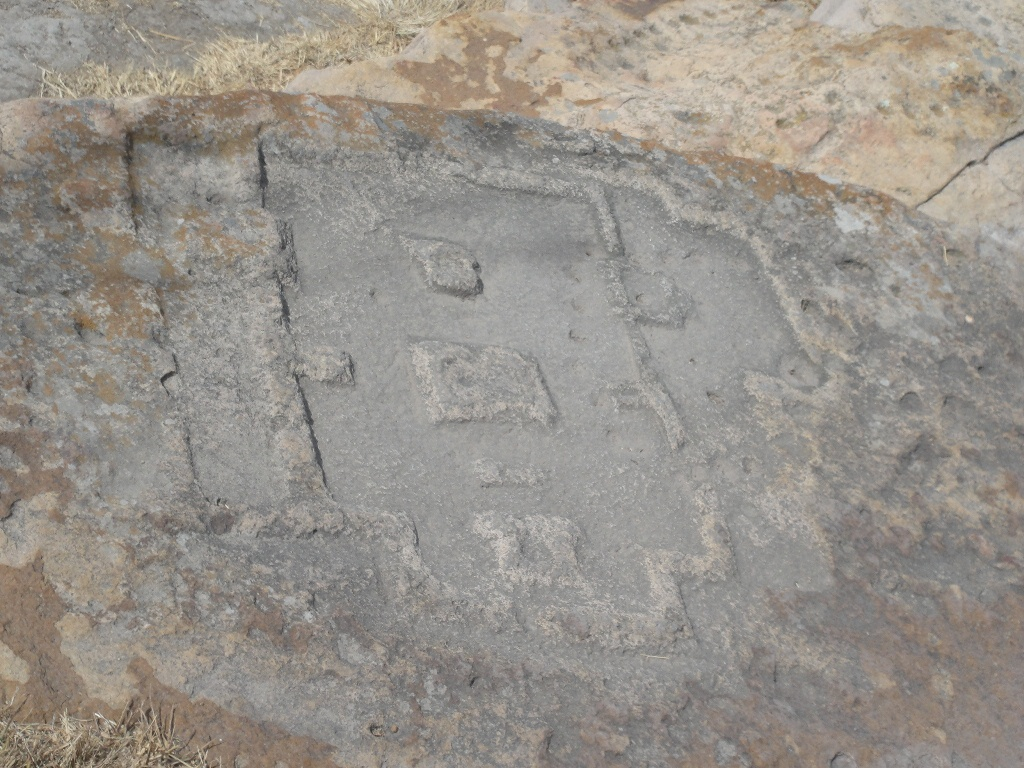
Plazuelas model, carved in rock, located at the edge of the western ravine

The model outline Bajio architectonic elements, such as sunken patios and other features from far away regions, such as Teuchitlán (Guachimontones), that confirms the multi-ethnicity hypothesis of these lands.

An important sample is the model, depicting details of the Casas Tapadas complex, the details of elements engraved such as accesses, stairways, walkways and structures architectonic lay out is remarkable.

=== Sculptures ===
Among the relevant findings at the site, are several fragments of anthropomorphic stone sculptures that presumably were destroyed along with the site structures. These include a male figure, mutilated of hands, legs and head, seems to be a captive representation, its slim body, the back curvature and the arms are stiff up against its body, would indicate a person tied and captive, similar to others observed in other regions.

=== Phallus ===
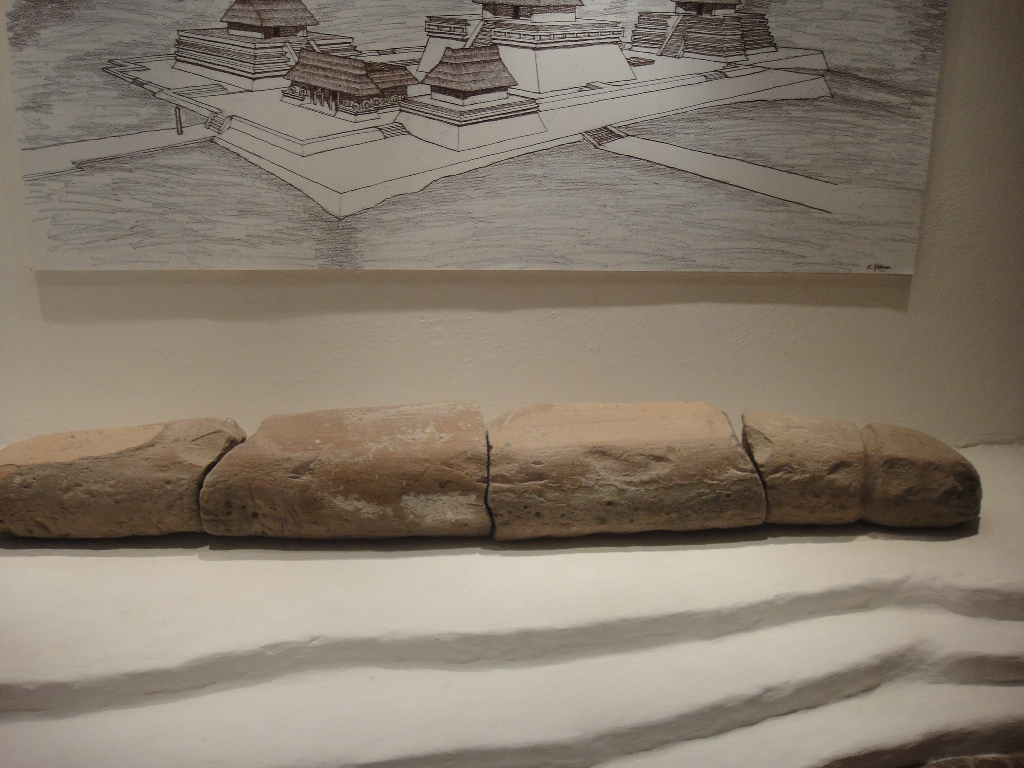
Phallus, located at site museum

Was found at the main entrance of casas tapadas, it was broken in four pieces. It is believed that it was vertically set originally. This is a male attribute marker to the site, representing fertility. It has many carvings, similar to others found in the site.

=== Turquoise ===
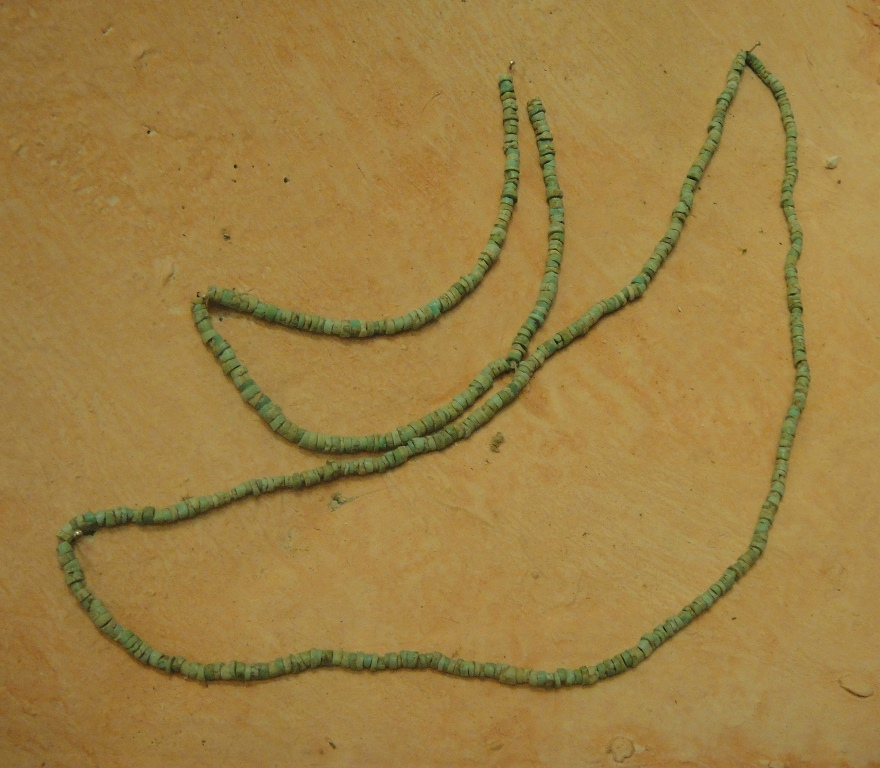
Turquoise collars, located at site museum

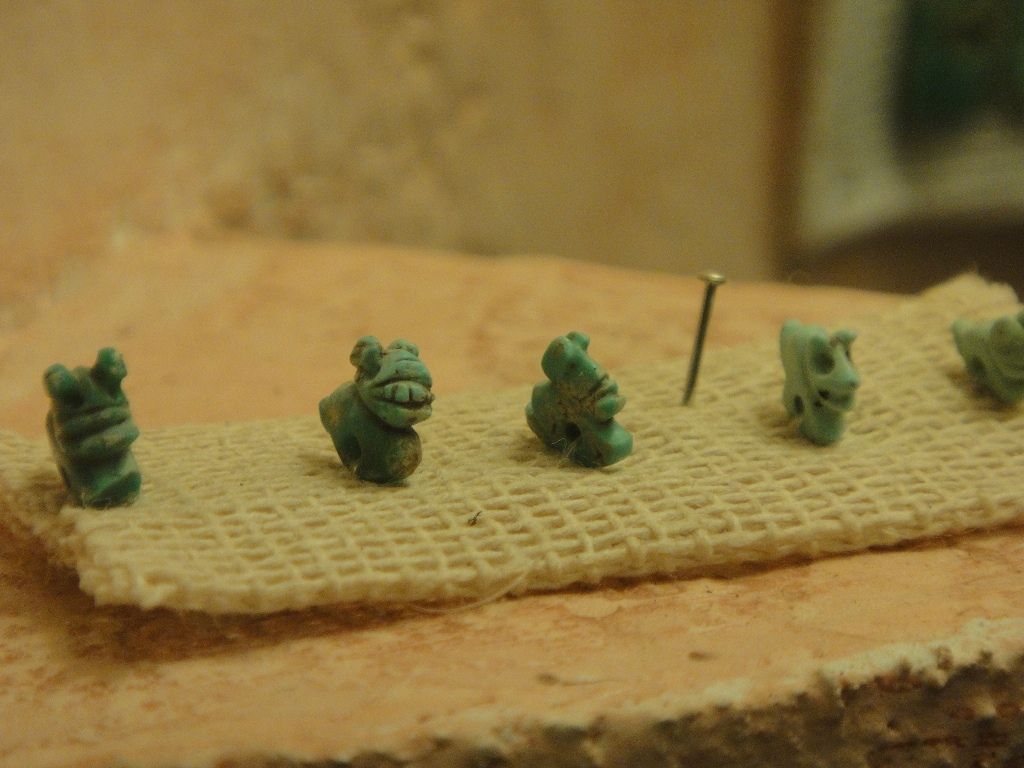
Tturquoise jewelry miniatures about 1/8" tall, located at site museum

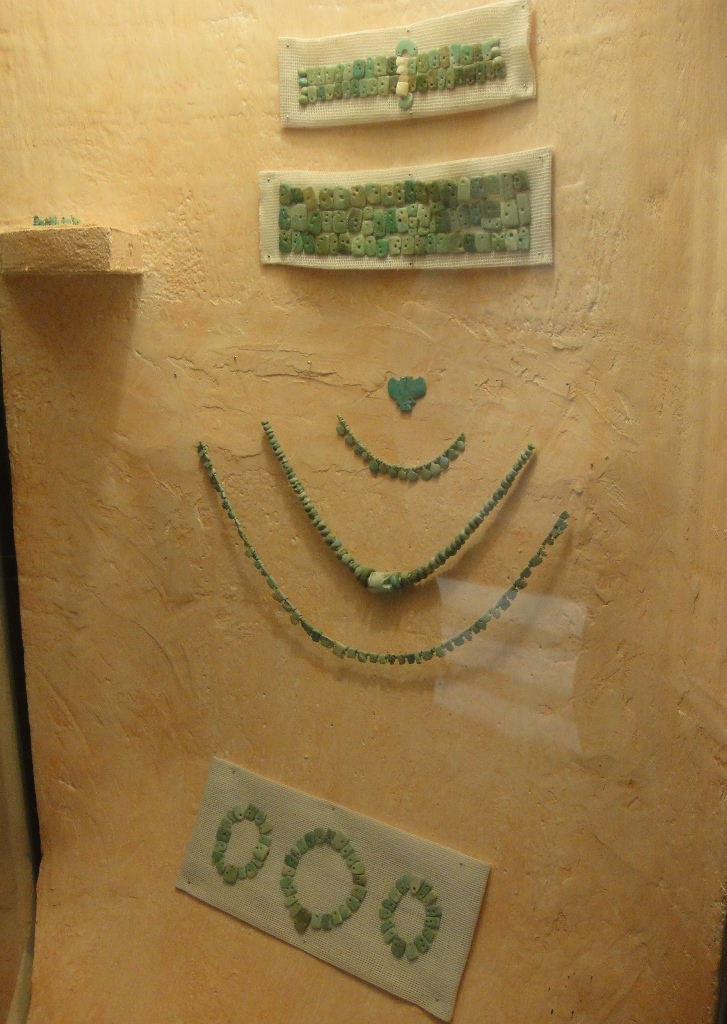
Turquoise jewelry, located at site museum

It was a high valued stone for jewels manufacturing, it was associated with water and the morning sky. Many pieces were found with various designs, among them are miniature figures (measuring about 3 mm or 1/8 of an inch), shaped as water droplets, lightning and dogs, animals associated with water.

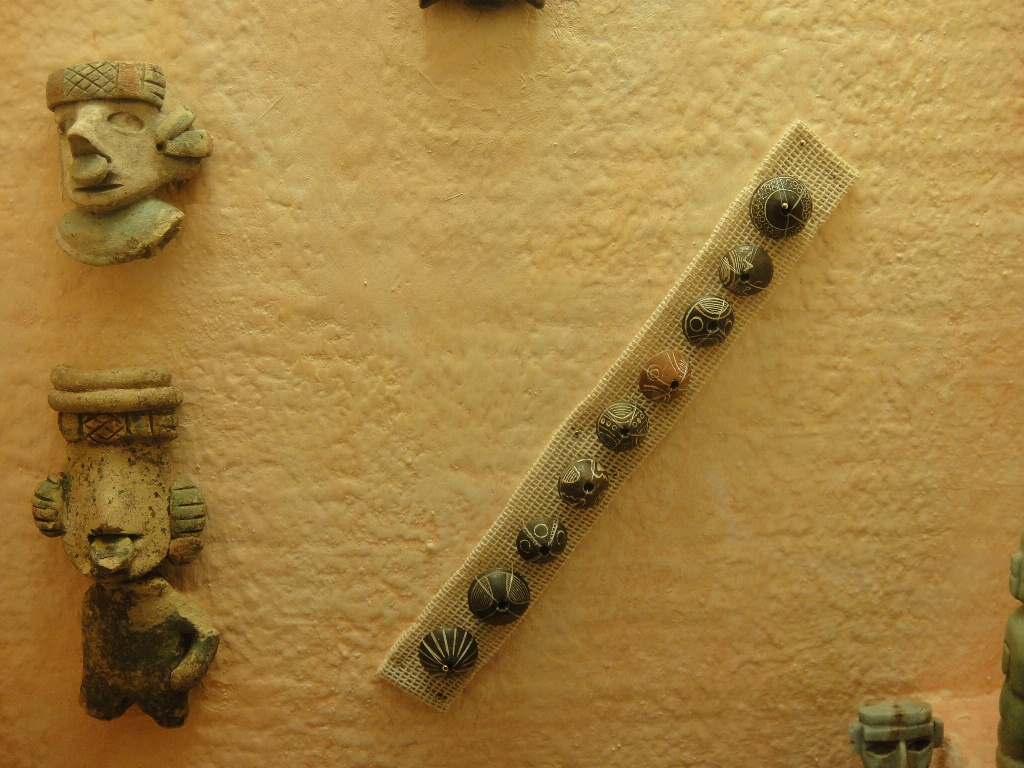
Decorations, located at site museum

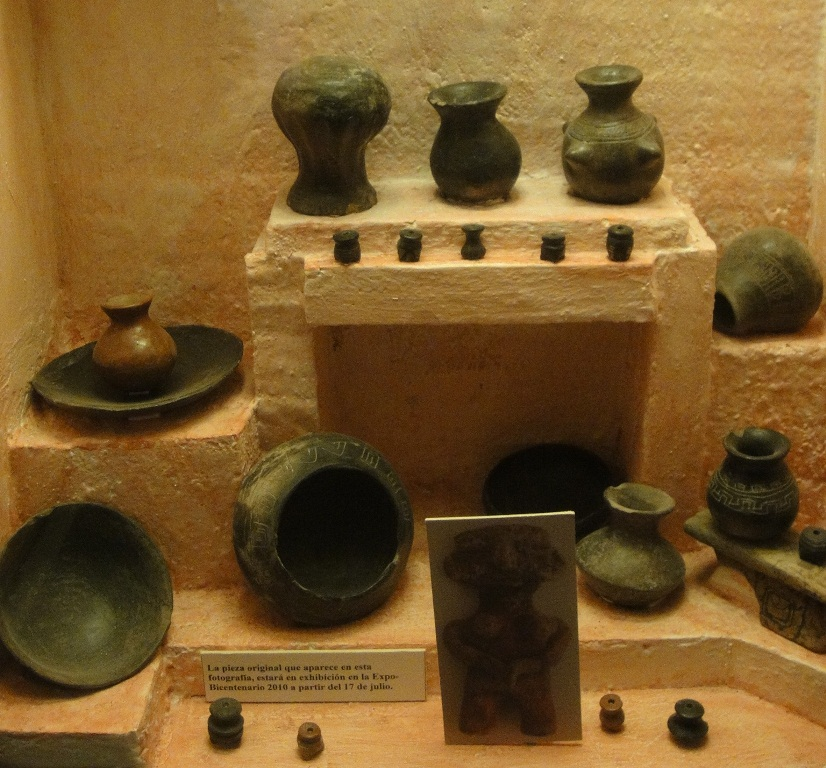
Pottery, located at site museum

=== Site museum ===
Upon entering the site, the museum is on the right hand side, it contains a large number of pieces found in the site.

Site facilities are well kept, including parking space, toilets, souvenirs and a well-marked site visit route. The museum offers guided tours by trained junior high school children.

== Bibliography ==
- Brambila Rosa, "Datos generales del Bajío" (Bajio General Data), en Cuadernos de arquitectura mesoamericana, número 25, UNAM, México, 1993, pp. 3–10. (in Spanish)
- Castañeda Carlos, Irapuato prehispánico (Prehispanic Irapuato), Archivo Centro INAH Guanajuato, México, 1997. Informe de la primera temporada de campo del proyecto Arqueológico Plazuelas, Archivo Centro INAH Guanajuato, 1998. (in Spanish)
- Castañeda Carlos y Gladys Casimir, Las piedras talladas de Plazuelas (The Plazuelas engraved stones), ponencia presentada en el III Coloquio Internacional sobre Otopames, Toluca, Estado de México, noviembre de 1999. (in Spanish)
- Weigand Phil, Evolución de una civilización prehispánica Evolution of a prehispanic culture), El Colegio de Michoacán, Zamora Michoacán, 1993. (in Spanish)
