= Barajas (archaeological site) =

Archaeological site in Pénjamo, Guanajuato, Mexico

Barajas is an archaeological site located in the municipality of Pénjamo, Guanajuato, Mexico, which includes a large complex of approximately 15 archeological sites in good preservation state, built on a small volcanic massif in the Bajío.

== Background ==
The area north of the Lerma River, is presumed to have been originally occupied by hunter-gatherer nomadic groups, Barajas construction was probably made by late occupants. Characteristics indicate that these constructions were sedentary establishments. Lifestyles and social characteristics follow the Mesoamerican model. It is estimated that the site was abandoned around year 1000 CE.

During the first millennium CE, Mesoamerica had its greatest boom. Sedentary groups inhabited the arid plains of Northern Mexico. Around the year 1000 CE, for unknown reasons sedentary groups left the region, so returned to the nomad cultures of the desert territory. This impacted the Mesoamerican environment: it is known (oral and pictorial tradition of the Postclassic) that there were frequent migrations from the North for 500 years before the Spanish invasion. As well as the claimed northern roots of the Toltec, Aztec and Purépecha. Barajas may have been an intermediate point of these migrations.

Northern Mexico has been studied by Pedro Armillas (1964, 1969), Braniff (1989, 1994). More recent archaeological has been made by France, with research periods in 1998, 1999 and 2000.

=== Occupation ===
Recent research shows that the area was occupied during the Epiclassical period (650–950 CE). Epoch during which the inhabitants were sedentary groups (farmers) and became an important population of the Bajío. It is estimated that sedentary groups began the occupation of the area from the Mid-Classical Mesoamerican period (450–650 CE) and sites were abandoned in the late 10th century, in a generalized manner, a phenomenon consistent with the fall of northern Mesoamerica. Some traces indicate that sites were visited sporadically by the late Postclassical hunters of Purépecha artifacts.

=== Settlement and Social Organization ===
During the area apogee, hundreds of structures of various types and sizes were built, used andesite slabs for construction. Widely available in the area, was used for the construction of their religious and housing structures.

The similarity of structures on neighboring hills was observed. This architectural feature indicates that sites in the area were part of a similar complex.

Housing areas provide an indication of life in the Epiclassical. The majority of the inhabitants lived in rectangular houses, with interior spaces often divided in several rooms. The high slab walls, built on a terrace, with roofs built with perishable materials. Among the houses were free spaces, often with changes made by terraces, which were probably used for agriculture. The ruling class rooms were large and more complexes part of the housing units.

== The Site ==
The zone includes approximately 15 different surrounding sites, among these are:

=== Nogales ===
The "Nogales" presumably was the main civic-ceremonial center, because it includes the most complex and monumental structures. Structures A1, A2 and A3 were excavated. Detected five levels of successive occupation by the abundant ceramic, radiocarbon dating allowed establishing a chronological sequence.

This site was discovered in the early 1980s. Its constructors built a fortress in the north of the Protohistoric Purépecha Kingdom (Zepeda 1988, Sánchez Correa 1993). The architectural features of Nogales allow the assumption of an occupation during the epiclassical and early Postclassical period (700–1000 CE), it is suspected that Nogales could be related to the San Antonio site from Carupo (Michoacan) which presents at least one of the buildings with similar impressive buildings of the Chalchihuites culture (Faugère - Kalfon 1991, 1996). This last finding indeed raised an identity problem for the occupants of the Barajas massif and in general, the phenomena observed there.

Group A Nogales Structures A1 y A2. Residential structures

Group B Nogales, non-domestic buildings: a small altar was discovered (B4) located at the center of a ceremonial place ornamented with three impressive pyramidal structures.

Group G Nogales, G9. A study was performed of funerary practices and biological characteristics of the massif populations. Investigation of structure G9 offered interesting information. It is a small artificial terrace that supports the damaged vestiges of a tile construction. The terrace fill had burials associated with Barajas phase: more or less complete remains of five primary funerals were discovered in 4 square meters. The best preserved funeral had the remains of an adult woman buried in a hole in dorsal decubitus with legs in extended position. This woman was buried with the bones of another adult (secondary probably), as well as a rich offerings consisting of ten ceramic vessels, an adornment made of small conch pearls were found at the waist and a plug, cut in the form of a token.

=== Yácata El Angel ===
The H2 structure has large buildings. These had divisions and several rooms. They were built around inner courtyards. They were normally associated with a structure whose central atrium was likely used as meeting space and funerals. Occasionally had a closed courtyard.

Group C Yácata El Ángel: patio and associated articles.

=== El Moro ===
Group D El Moro. Concentration of small wells built from slabs, extensively used.

=== Casas Tapadas ===
Group A Casas Tapadas. Excavated two small parts of structures, probably residential buildings, an underground structure was found.

=== Los Toriles ===
Some study work focused on the defensive site of the Toriles, the door in the wall was partially refurbished.

== Occupation Phases ==
Nogales Phase. 450–500 to 750 CE.

Barajas Phase. 750 to 950 CE.

Early Postclassical. 950 to 1100 CE.

Late Posclassical. 1400 to 1521 CE.

Early research carried out on the site and its surroundings have allowed obtaining an overview of the occupation of this area of the Lerma Valley. Firstly, the results confirm assumptions about the main Barajas occupation between 750 and 950 of our era, i.e. in an Epiclassical chronological position.

Also show that the Barajas phase occupation was preceded and followed by well identifiable though modest occupations. In this context, the importance and the relative brevity of Barajas occupation raises many questions. The represented demographic expansion does not appear to be explained by the natural increase of previously present groups; it is tempting to consider a migratory phenomenon resulted in the colonization of the massif previously uninhabited. This migration could also result from people living nearby, in the form of consolidation or relocation of the habitat. It may correspond also to wider movements (as might be assumed by the appearance of ceramics, from the Altos de Jalisco region types). These two hypotheses are not incompatible.
