= Sierra Gorda =

Ecoregion in Mexico

- IUCN category Ia (strict nature reserve)
- Waterfall in the Sierra Gorda, 2007

- Location within Mexico
- Location: Querétaro, Mexico
- Nearest city: Jalpan de Serra
- Coordinates: 21°18′39″N 99°40′05″W
- Area: 383,567 ha (947,810 acres)
- Established: May 19, 1997
- Governing body: National Commission of Protected Natural Areas (CONANP), Secretariat of the Environment and Natural Resources (SEMARNAT).
- Website: www.sierragorda.net

The Sierra Gorda (lit. 'fat mountain(s)') is an ecological region centered on the northern third of the Mexican state of Querétaro and extending into the neighboring states of Guanajuato, Hidalgo and San Luis Potosí. Within Querétaro, the ecosystem extends from the center of the state starting in parts of San Joaquín and Cadereyta de Montes municipalities and covering all of the municipalities of Peñamiller, Pinal de Amoles, Jalpan de Serra, Landa de Matamoros and Arroyo Seco, for a total of 250 km^{2} of territory. The area is extremely rugged with high steep mountains and deep canyons. As part of the Huasteca Karst, it also contains many formations due to erosion of limestone, especially pit caves known locally as sótanos. The area is valued for its very wide diversity of plant and animal life, which is due to the various microenvironments created by the ruggedness of the terrain and wide variation in rainfall. This is due to the mountains' blocking of moisture coming in from the Gulf of Mexico, which generally makes the east side fairly moist and the west semiarid scrub brush. Most of the region is protected in two biosphere reserves, with the one centered in Querétaro established in 1997 and the one centered in Guanajuato established in 2007. The Sierra Gorda is considered to be the far west of the La Huasteca region culturally and it is home to the Franciscan Missions in the Sierra Gorda of Querétaro World Heritage Site. Sierra Gorda has become the first National Park in Mexico to join the EarthCheck Sustainable Destinations program.

== Geography ==
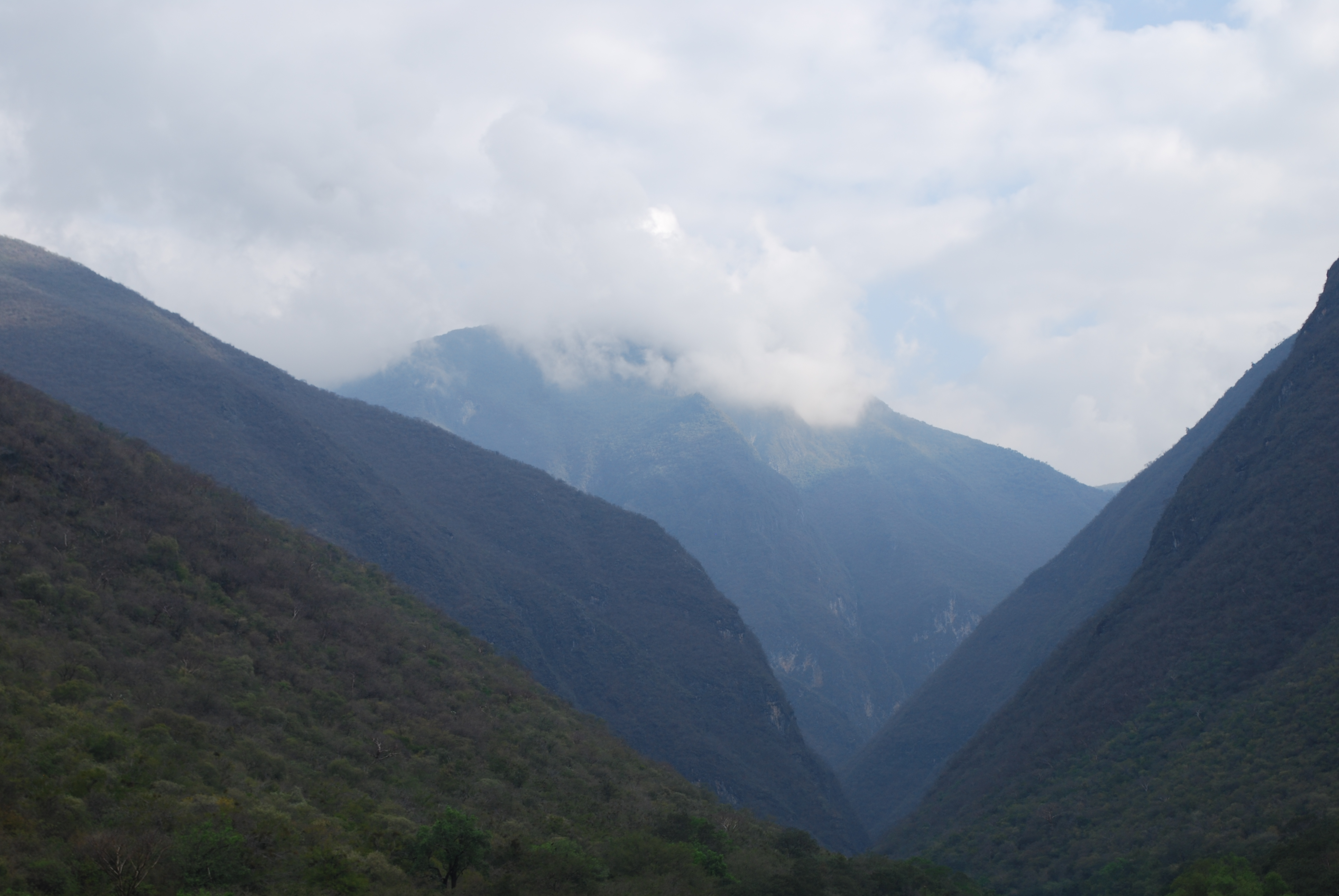
Mountains at the junction of the Arroyo and Jalpan Rivers in Arroyo Seco

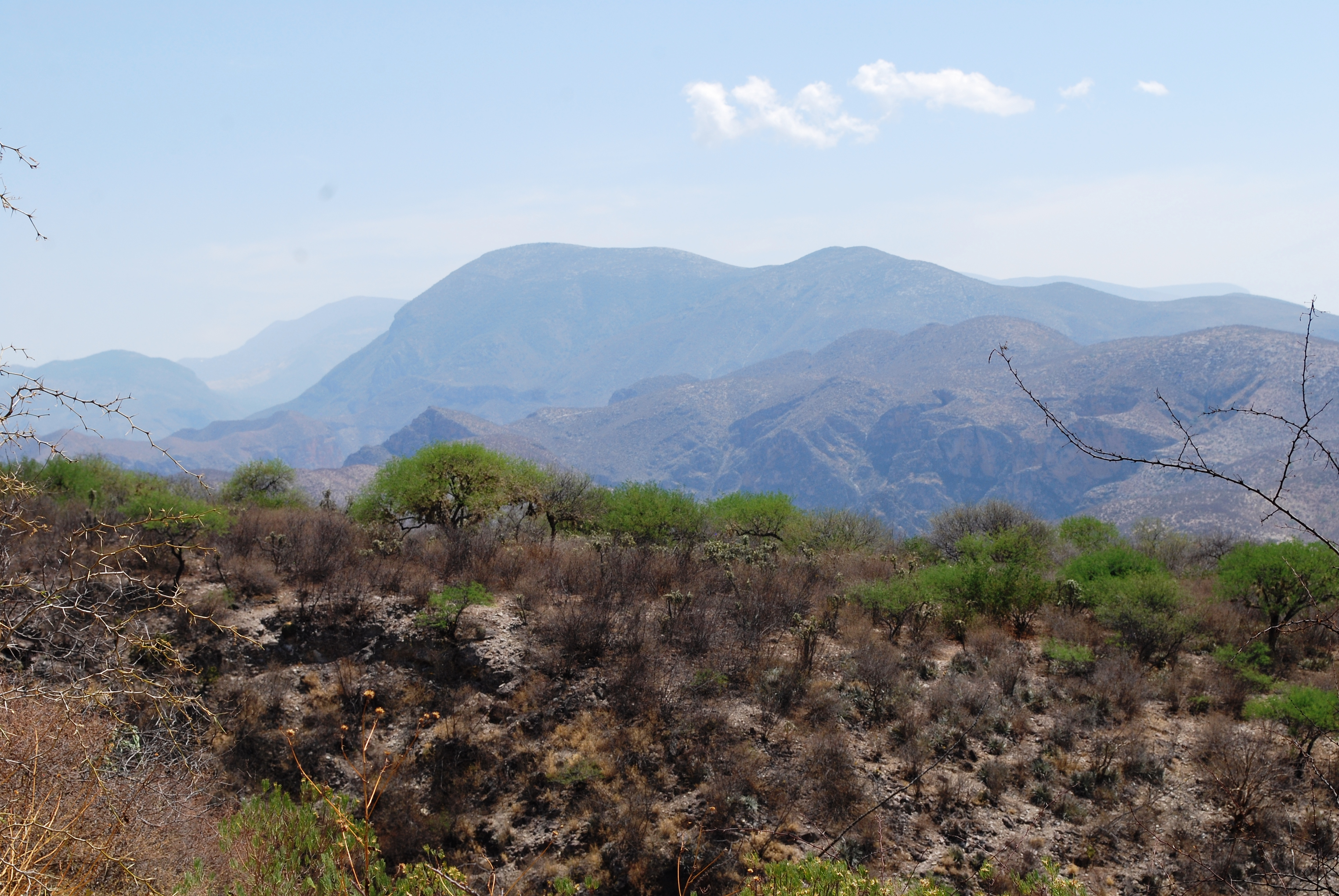
Semidesert and mountains in the municipality of Peñamiller

The region is on a branch of the Sierra Madre Oriental mountain range and consists of a series of mountain chains that run northwest to southeast, formed 240 million years ago. Most are made of limestone, formed by sea beds from the Jurassic and Cretaceous periods. Later there were intrusions of volcanic rock, especially in the eastern portion in Hidalgo state, from which come the mineral deposits of the area. The limestone has been affected by erosion to form the Huasteca Karst, and the area contains a large number of caverns, and pit caves (sótanos), some of which extend for hundreds of meters in depth. All of the Sierra Gorda is marked by very rugged terrain, which includes canyons and steep mountains. Elevations range from just 300 meters above sea level in the Río Santa María Canyon in Jalpan to 3,100 m asl at the Cerro de la Pingüica in Pinal de Amoles. The most significant peak in the Hidalgo area is Cerro Cangandhó which has an elevation of 2,820 m asl. Rainfall also varies greatly from 350 mm to 2,000 mm per year. Among its mountains are the peaks associated with the Sierra Alta de Hidalgo, the pine forests of Zamoarano, the Extoraz Canyon and the slopes of the Huazmazonta, the inter-mountain valleys where the five missions are found and the rolling hills leading into La Huasteca. The wide variations of elevation and rainfall favor a wide variety of flora and wildlife.

There are three main rivers in the Sierra Gorda, all of which are part of the Pánuco River basin. These are the Santa María River, the Extoraz or Peñamiller River and the Moctezuma River. All three pass through deep canyons and tend to form borders between the states and municipalities of the region. Santa María marks part of the border between Querétaro and San Luis Potosí, and the Moctezuma River marks part of the border between Querétaro and Hidalgo. The Tula and Moctezuma Rivers meet in the Sierra Gorda of Hidalgo. Here, the Moctezuma River Canyon extends for twelve km and rises 480 meters above the floor.

== Climate ==
The climate of the region depends on elevation and that the mountains form a natural barrier against the main source of moisture, the Gulf of Mexico. The east side of the mountains gets significant more rainfall than the west, in the form of orographic precipitation and clouds as the moisture-laden winds from the Gulf of Mexico ascend the mountain slopes. Forests and even rainforests are found in the east, while the west is dominated by desert and near desert conditions. In the east, mornings in the high mountain areas usually bring cloud cover and fog. The most moisture falls in the northeastern edges of the regions, where it merges into La Huasteca proper, in San Luis Potosí and Hidalgo. In the entire region, the coldest temperatures occur between December and January, with high temperatures in April and May. Temperatures vary widely depending on elevation with an annual average of 13 °C in the higher elevations such as Pinal de Amoles to 24 °C in lower areas such as Jalpan. In the highest elevations, frosts and freezes are not uncommon. In 2010, the Sierra Gorda had it first significant snowfall in eighteen years in the municipality of Pinal de Amoles, with temperatures of −4 °C. In some places, the cover was 15 cm deep.

== Ecology ==
Because of its great variety of ecosystems, the Sierra Gorda has one of the most diverse ecologies in Mexico, with one of the largest number of species of plants and animals.

The micro-environments of the region range from conifer forests, oak forests, mostly found on mountain peaks, banana and sugar cane fields in the deeper canyons. On the east side, there are deciduous forests. On the west side, bordering the Mexican Plateau, there are desert and semi desert conditions, with a variety of cacti and arid scrub brush.

Species in danger of extinction include the jaguar, puma, the black bear, the green parrot, the Veracruz partridge, and the Humboldt butterfly, mostly due to human activities. Endangered plant species include the biznaga gigante (Echinocactus platyacanthus), the chapote (Diospyros riojae), the guayamé (Abies guatemalensis), the magnolia (Magnolia dealbata) and the peyote (Lophophora diffusa). monarch butterflies can be found in the area as well, as they pass through to their wintering grounds on the State of Mexico-Michoacán border . There have been plagues in the forests of the area due to the recent drought conditions. The most serious is a bark beetle (Dendroctonus adjunctus) and mistletoe (Arceuthobium sp.). The drought conditions have been blamed on global climate change. Areas in Querétaro and Guanajuato have been declared as biosphere reserves. The Sierra Gorda in Hidalgo has not, but it still contains a large number of important ecosystems.

== Biosphere reserves ==
There are two major conservation areas in the Sierra Gorda region: one in Querétaro and one in the state of Guanajuato.

=== Biosphere reserve in Querétaro ===
Map of the Sierra Gorda region in Querétaro

The Sierra Gorda Biosphere in Querétaro was established by decree on May 19, 1997 because of its exceptional variety of species and ecosystems. Uniquely among protected areas of Mexico, it was established thanks to environmental activism, efforts that were led by Martha Isabel Ruiz Corzo and her Sierra Gorda Ecological Group (GESG, Grupo Ecológico Sierra Gorda). The reserve extends for about 400,000 hectares over the states of Querétaro and San Luis Potosí. It covers about 32% of the state of Querétaro and is roughly the size of Rhode Island. When it was declared, the reserve had 683 communities with about 100,000 inhabitants. However, since then, the population has nearly dropped to about half. In Querétaro, the biosphere reserve encompasses the municipalities of Jalpan de Serra, Landa de Matamoros, Arroyo Seco, Pinal de Amoles (88% of its territory) and Peñamiller (69.7% of its territory). The biosphere was declared as a result of grassroots efforts, the only one to be established this way in Mexico. The original declaration encompasses 383.567 hectares. In 2001, it was added to the International Networks of Man and Biosphere of UNESCO as the thirteenth Mexican reserve on the list, occupying first place in regards to ecodiversity. It is also recognized as a Área de Importancia para la Conservación de las Aves (Area of Importance for the Conservation of Birds) by the Consejo Internacional para la Preservación de las Aves Mexicanas.

The reserve begins in the dry semi desert areas in the center of Querétaro and as one moves north and higher into the mountain peaks of Pinal de Amoles at around 3,100 metres (10,200 ft), the scenery changes to temperate forest of conifers. The elevation is lower north into Jalpan and the climate is warmer and wetter before moving into the rolling hills of the La Huasteca in San Luis Potosí and Hidalgo. Elevations in the reserve range from 350 to 3,100 meters above sea level, with rugged mountains, canyons, lush valley and “sótanos” or pit caves carved out from the limestone of the Huasteca Karst. Humidity is primarily from the Gulf of Mexico, which makes the northeast of the region green, but the southwest, blocked from the moisture by the high mountains, is dominated by arid scrub brush. This combination of varying elevation and moisture patterns creates the regions primary biological characteristic, which is a large number of ecosystems in a relatively small area. It has 15 vegetative types, including old growth moist montane forests covered in bromeliads and orchids, high elevation pine-oak forests, a great diversity of cactus, wild oregano and lowland tropical forests . The biosphere is the seventh largest federally protected natural area and has the greatest biodiversity of all of them, including those which encompass marine areas, as it is home to 10 of Mexico's 11 ecosystems. The diversity of the area can also be seen in the number of plant and animals species found in the reserve. There are 2,308 species of plants, with about thirty-five percent of the area covered by forested areas of oaks, junipers and pines. There are 130 mammal, 71 reptile and 23 amphibian species, including six feline species, the black bear (Ursus americanus) and the Mexican spider monkey (Ateles geoffroyi vellerosus). There are 360 species of birds, more than 30 percent of the bird species in the country, including military macaws (Ara militaris). Migrating monarch butterflies pause here on their southern route, and butterfly species in general total more than all that are in the U.S. and Canada combined. Many of these species are endangered, and many have not yet been studied.

The biosphere reserve in Querétaro is managed by Comisión Nacional de Áreas Naturales Protegidas of Semarnat. The management system is a combination of federal authorities working with the participation of local communities. The land is generally not owned by the government. Thirty percent of the reserve is communally owned land with the rest privately owned, with the government issuing regulations. Cooperation between federal authorities and local communities has not always gone smoothly, with local residents complaining that the government has issues decrees without consulting them. The CESG and the biosphere project have attracted international support from sponsors such as the Schwab Foundation, Shell, Wal-Mart, Hewlett-Packard, Grupo Bimbo and nongovernmental organizations such as Ashoka, conservation foundations and U.N. agencies. The Grupo Ecológico Sierra Gorda was one of 94 winners of the Energy Globe competition among 700 entrants. It received 10,000 Euros to help fund its projects. Conservation of the area has also attracted the attention of people such as director James Cameron, who sponsored a reforestation project on 120 hectares. This is in addition to various other reforestation projects that have been ongoing since the 1990s. These projects even include an overall forest management plan designed to produce enough wood for local woodcutters to earn a living.

=== Biosphere reserve in Guanajuato ===
Much of the Sierra Gorda region which extends into the state of Guanajuato was declared a biosphere reserve in 2007 to preserve its biodiversity as well. In this state, protected area covers 236,882 hectares which is the entire municipality of Xichú, 70% of Victoria, 65% of Atarjea, about a quarter of San Luis de la Paz and a small portion of Santa Catarina. The reserve here is divided into a nucleus, which is in the municipalities of Victoria, Ajarjea and Xichú, and a periphery. Only eco tourism, research activities, traditional economic activities and low impact development is allowed in the nucleus.

This section of the Sierra Gorda is home to eighty four species of plants from trees to cacti, 182 species of birds and 42 species of mammals. The rugged terrain means that there are a wide number and variety of microclimates although average temperatures vary only between 16 and 19 °C. It lowest point is a canyon called Paso de Hormigas in Xichú at 650 meters above sea level with a very warm climate suitable for tropical fruit. The highest point is Pinal de Zamorano at 3,300 meters, followed by El Picacho de Pueblo Nuevo, El Zorillo and El Cuervo all above 2,700 meters. The largest changes are seen in arid versus wetter zones, which can often be relatively nearby, with foliage changing from rainforest to pine forest to desert landscapes. The area is the poorest in Guanajuato, with over 200 communities which have a population of less than 150. This area is the most rugged in the state where most of the natural areas and small villages are remain intact due to their inaccessibility. Culturally, the Sierra Gorda region is the far western part of La Huasteca, which extends over parts of the states of Querétaro, San Luis Potosí, Hidalgo and Veracruz.

=== Conservation challenges ===
The greatest conservation challenge is that the area is the second most populated natural protected area in Mexico with severe problems with poverty. This creates a need to balance conservation efforts with local subsistence needs. One important aspect of this is to manage forest resources so that local woodcutters can make a living while controlling how much is cut. However, mass migration out of the region has almost halved the population of the Querétaro biosphere to about 50,000 people since it was declared. This has taken pressure off of local natural resources, as agriculture, livestock production and logging lessen. Many of the people who have left are in the United States and send money back home. This money has spurred the building of larger homes and the proliferation of pick up trucks, many with U.S. license plates. It has also allowed for the change to gas over firewood for cooking, but garbage has become a problem. However, overall the depopulation has been positive for the recuperation of the biosphere.

Despite the lessened pressure, economic activities still take a toll on the area. Illegal logging is still a very serious problem, as the area has attracted loggers from outside. The problem is most serious in Landa de Matamoros, Pinal de Amoles and Jalpan de Serra. Aside from commercial loggers, areas are also cleared by local farmers looking for more space for animals and crops. This has led to springs and river drying up and eroding of topsoil. While strict environmental protection laws exist, enforcement is lacking. Local authorities have requested the creation of environmental police to guard the forest areas. However, much of the enforcement is done by the local community itself.

Lastly, there have been problems with droughts and pest infestations. These include the roundheaded pine beetle, European mistletoe, and caterpillars. Some residents see the event as divine will but others place global warming. It is not known how much of the oaks, junipers and pines that make up most of the forested areas have been compromised but there are visible yellow patches seen in the otherwise green forest. The pests have been able to infest more because trees are weak due to drought conditions.

Efforts to help the local community preserve the area and make a living primarily consist of payouts to landowners who conserve and eco-tourism. Recently, the federal government along with the United Nations, began a program to pay private land owners for "environmental services" of between 18 and 27 US dollars for each hectare they conserve each year. However, this only covers about 215 landowners and 21.500 hectares, 5.6% of the total reserve. The second is the promotion of tourism based on the area's natural resources. One organization dedicated to this is Sierra Gorda Ecotours.

=== Sierra Gorda de Hidalgo ===
The Sierra Gorda in Hidalgo has not been declared a biosphere reserve, but it still contains a large number of important ecosystems. It is mountainous with a wide variety of ecosystems like other parts of the Sierra Gorda, but this area has a greater percentage of the volcanic rock when entered the area late in its geological history. The terrain is very rocky and difficult to travel. The most important elevation in the Hidalgo area is the Cerro Cangandhó which has an elevation of 2,820 masl, located in the Sierra Alta de Hidalgo, The area is marked by the Moctezuma and Tula Rivers. The first contains a canyon which is 480 meters deep. The border between Hidalgo and Querétaro is marked by where the Moctezuma and Tula Rivers meet. This area is also home to one of the largest hydroelectric dams in Mexico.

The Sierra Gorda of Hidalgo roughly divides into an arid south and a north filled with forests. In both areas, days are significantly warmer than the nights. The north contains forests of pine, ocote, oaks, junipers and other trees. The south is more arid and much of it is scrub brush. This part of the Sierra Gorda, especially the south, is dominated by the Otomis, rather than the Huasteca or Chichimeca. The most important city is Zimapán. Agriculture is limited to corn grown during the rainy season but yields are poor due to the lack of flat lands and fertile soil. Agriculture also increases erosion. More important to the economy is mining, with minerals such as lead, zinc, magnesium, silver and stone such as marble and opals.(higalgogob)

== People and culture ==
A number of indigenous communities still inhabit the region. The eastern part in Hidalgo is dominated by the Otomi. The far north of Querétaro still has significant communities of Pames, and Guanajuato has a number of Chichimeca groups.

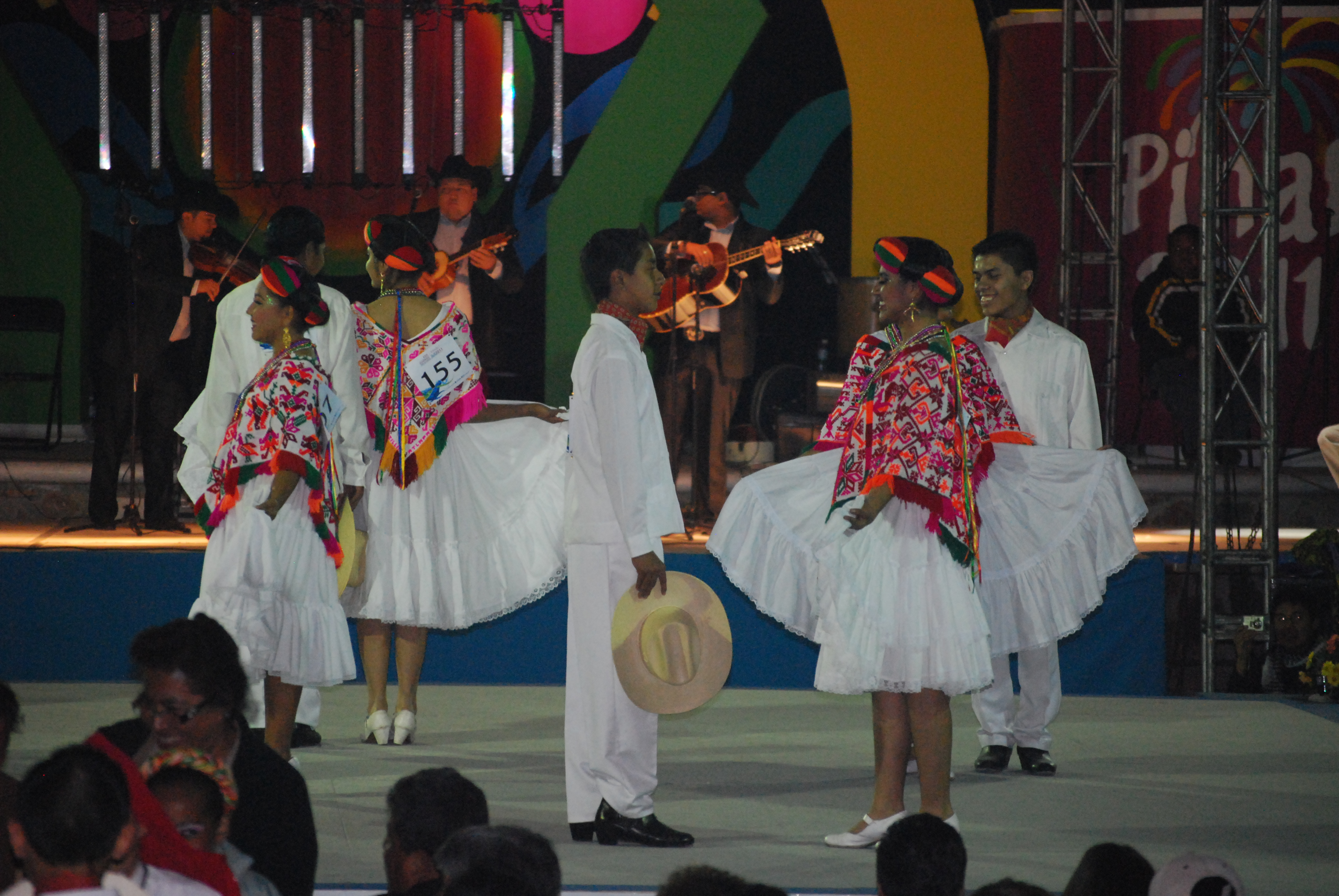
Participants in the annual Huapango dance competition in Pinal de Amoles

While indigenous people make up a very small percentage of the population of the region, the Huasteca culture has had a strong impact since the pre Hispanic period. Most of the region is considered to be at least nominally the far western part of this cultural region. Huapango is the dominant native musical and dance style in the Sierra Gorda, with festivals dedicated to it in Xichú, Pinal de Amoles, San Joaquín, where Huasteca influence is strongest. Most of the population lives in very small rural communities, many under 500 inhabitants. There are no notable social conflicts in this area, which is free of problems related to the illegal drug trade that afflict other parts of the country.

Poverty levels are high in the area despite the ecological and cultural richness. Tourism has been a recent phenomenon here, as the area's ecological importance becomes more widely known. Most still make a living from agriculture, livestock and mining and in some areas, these traditional economies are protected by law. However, the extreme poverty of the area has forced many, especially younger residents, to migrate to seek employment. This has led to many areas becoming dependent on remittances sent back home, much of it from the United States. In some areas, one in four households is supported by remittance money.

There is an annual cycling event called "Escalera del Infierno" (Hell's Ladder) which extends over the Sierra Gorda in Querétaro in March. The event begins in Bernal, through Ezequiel Montes, Cadereyta and ends in San Joaquín, for 137 km, 28 km of which are uphill.

== Settlements ==
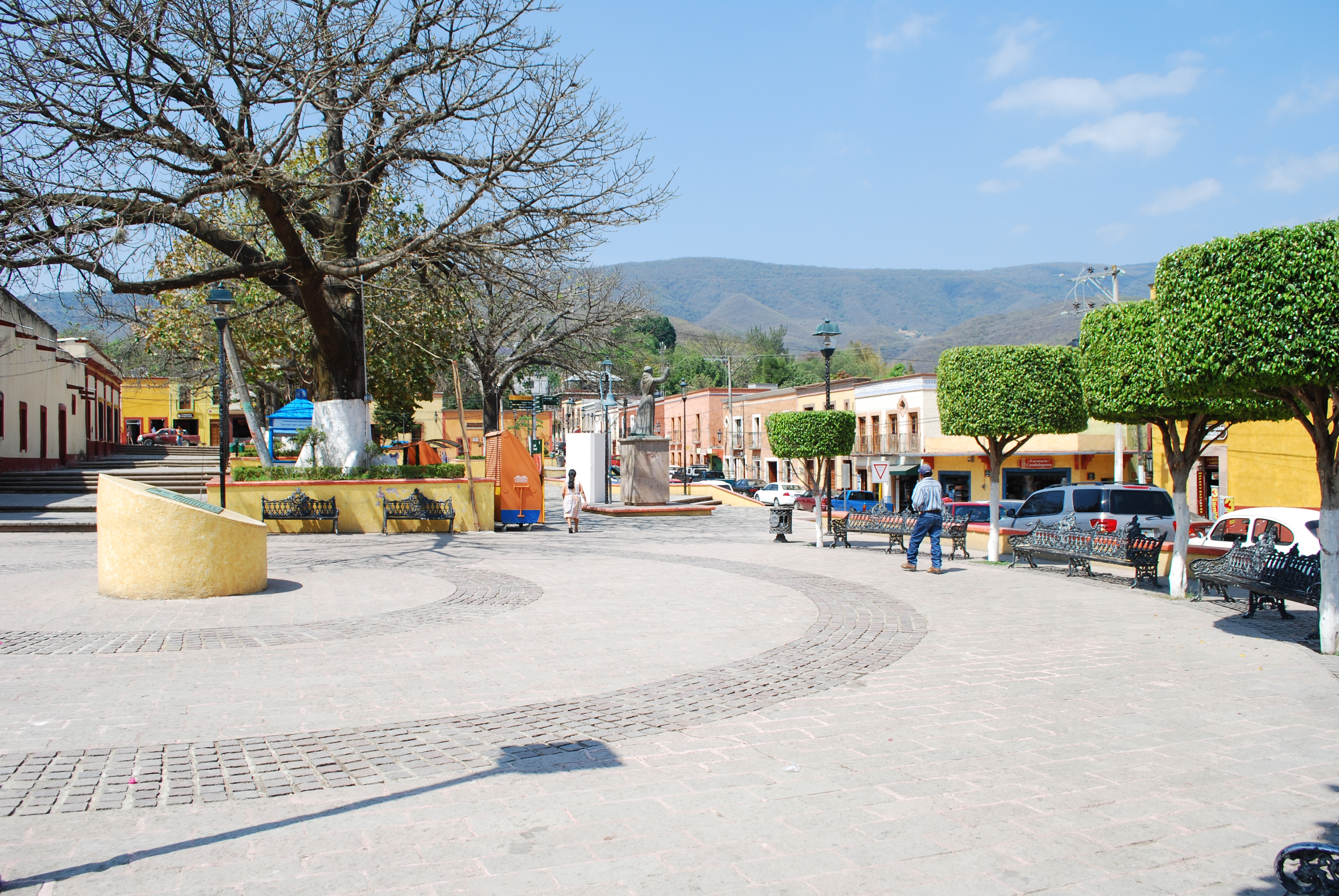
View of Fraile Plaza in Jalpan de Serra

Jalpan de Serra is in the north of Querétaro. It is called the "heart of the Sierra Gorda" in part due to is geographic location in the city and the fact that it is the only city in the biosphere. Jalpan is closely surrounded by mountains, with cobblestone streets around the very center. Mornings frequently are foggy or cloudy, with the sun burn such off by midday. Ecotourism and tourism related to the five Franciscan friary declared a World Heritage Site have recently become an important part of the economy. The Jalpan Dam has become important as a habitat for aquatic birds.

There is a museum in Jalpan de Serra dedicated to the history and geography of the Sierra Gorda region. The museum building was first constructed in 1576 as a fort and military outpost. It was reconstructed at the end of the 16th century. It was remodeled in 1990 and was inaugurated as a museum in 1991, with a collection of pieces that range from the pre Hispanic era to the Reform War. It has eight halls for exhibits, a bookstore, an audiovisualroom, a temporary exhibit hall, research center and library. It organizes educational, ecological and cultural events.

Xichú, in the state of Guanajuato, was founded in 1585 as a mining town, with the municipality containing a high elevation at Cerro El Descarado, at 2,400 masl and a low elevation where the Santa María River and the Xoconoxtle meet at 826 masl, the lowest in the state. It has a population of over 11,000 people and although very few are indigenous, Huasteca influence is notable.

Zimapán is the largest city in the Hidalgo portion of the Sierra Gorda. Unlike other parts of the Sierra Gorda, this area has been dominated by the Otomi, with the Spanish city founded in 1522. It is primarily a mining center, extracting various metals and stones from the steep mountains that surround it. The municipality has a fairly significant number of indigenous language speakers; over 3,000 in a total population of about 34,000.

== History ==
Human settlements in the area have been dated to between 6,000 and 4,000 years ago, in the southern part of the region, with the earliest found in the far south of the area in what is now the municipality of Cadereyta de Montes, in an area called the Mesa de León. The earliest inhabitants were hunter-gatherers; however over time, many developed sedentary agricultural villages by the end of the Pre Classic period . The development of these villages was bolstered by migration of agricultural peoples from the Mexican Plateau and the Gulf of Mexico coast, especially from the latter. Agriculture was concentrated in the lower valley areas, the few plains and some sides of mountains. This also included the cutting of forests to make more agricultural land. Most settlements are found near springs, ponds and small lakes as they were the most readily usable sources of water, instead of the rivers which ran deep inside narrow canyons. This included the Huastecas, who were found mostly in the far northeast of the region, noted for growing cotton.

The height of settlement of the area came between the 6th and 10th centuries, with the largest number of successful human settlements, with an economy based on farming and mining. During this time, the area saw intense commercial traffic and cultural exchanges between Gulf of Mexico, the Huasteca area and the Mexican Plateau, with artifacts related to Río Verde in San Luis Potosí, Teotihuacan, Tula, west to the Bajío and from the valleys of Querétaro and San Juan del Río all found. However, the peoples of the Sierra Gorda had more ties with peoples to the west, north and east, than with the Mexican Plateau to the south. This is when the cities of Las Ranas and Toluquilla grew. The two cities’ economies were based on the control of trade routes and mining of cinnabar, used as a red pigment. The mining of cinnabar required coordinated and hierarchical labor practices for the various tasks involved, which would lead to the development of these cities. This area was the primary provider of red pigment to Mesoamerica.

Between 200 and 1000 CE, the area was culturally divided into three regions, Río Verde, the Serrana Cultura and the Huasteca. The Río Verde region is located in the northwest of the state of Querétaro into San Luis Potosí. The Serrana Culture is found around the archeological sites of Las Ranas and Toluquilla, which dominated most of the trade routes, and had the greatest population during the Classic Period (200-900CE). The Huasteca region is in the far northeast with major settlements at Tancoyol, La Campana, Tancama and Tonatico, which had fertile lands. The Otomi arrived in the area in 800 CE and settled peacefully.

The development of cities and dominions came to a halt in the 11th century, after being in decline for over 300 years before that. During the Post classic (900–1521) all of the area's cities in Querétaro would become abandoned. There are two theories as to why this occurred. The first is that there was climate change during this time, which caused the area to dry out. The second was that it was due to social phenomena, as a number of cities in Mesoamerica, including Teotihuacan went into decline. Eventually the cities of the Sierra Gorda were abandoned altogether, but this may have been gradual. Evidence at Las Ranas and Toluquilla indicate a non violent transition, as farming communities were abandoned and replaced by hunter-gatherer communities.

The hunter gatherer cultures that moved in from the 11th century remained until the colonial period, and were categorized together as "Chichimecas". These consisted in various ethnicities including Pames, Ximpeces Guachichils and Jonaz. All speak languages in the Oto-Manguean family, with differences mostly cultural. The Pames were found mostly in the east with the Jonaz in the west. In addition, there were also groups of Otomis and Huasteca to be found.

The areas in the far east and far west of the Sierra Gorda were dominated by the Spanish soon after the Spanish conquest of the Aztec Empire. What is now the Sierra Gorda in Guanajuato and Hidalgo states had Spanish cities in them by the middle of the 16th century. The main reason for this was that these areas had higher concentrations of mineral deposits. Another factor was that the indigenous peoples in these areas were relatively compliant to Spanish rule, especially in Hidalgo, where the Otomi had already been dominated by Xilotepec.

The Spanish entered the heart of the Sierra Gorda early, with Nuño de Guzmán conquering the Oxitipa dominion, which encompassed Jalpan, Xilitla, Tancoyol and Tilaco in 1527. However, during the early colonial period, the Querétaro Sierra Gorda would remain dangerous territory as the Chichimecas fought Spanish domination. with the first war between the Chichimeca Jonaz and the Spanish occurring in 1554. During the 16th and 17th century, the Spanish would surround this area on west, east and south, with military and missionary incursions into the interior. Spanish settlements were begun to the south of it, such as the Villa de Cadereyta in order to form a bulwark against the nomadic Chichimeca tribes. In the late 16th century, a number of forts were established in the area including El Jofre and Jalpan. The incursions were provoked not because of significant mineral deposits in northern Querétaro, but rather, the area laid on roads which led into mining areas such as Guanajuato and Zacatecas.

Missionary work began in 1550 with an Augustinian mission in Xilitla, San Luis Potosí. However, like military incursions, evangelism would occur from outside the heart of the region and gradually move inwards with many failures. However, the challenge to the Spanish was not only the hostility of the native peoples, but also this area lacked cities or towns, or the social hierarchy that was taken advantage of in other areas of Mesoamerica. In this region, the Spanish would have to create population centers.

Systematic evangelization of the Querétaro area would not be attempted until the 17th century, when Augustinians in the east and Franciscans in the west began building missions in 1670 and 1680s, under the military protection of Captain Jerónimo de Labra. However, Labra died in 1683, and the missions were unprotected. The Dominicans would arrive soon after but by 1700, both they and the Augustinians and Dominicans abandoned missions in most of the area, leaving only the Franciscans in Tolimán, Cadereyta, Escanela and Maconí. Many of the missions built in the interior during the 16th and 17th centuries were destroyed shortly after they were built. Successful missions were established in the far south of the region, with the mission of San Francisco Tolimán in 1683, the mission of San José de Vizarrón in the 1740s. Because of this, much of the first evangelization efforts undertaken before the mid 18th century have been largely forgotten.

In 1740, the colonial government in Mexico City decided to extinguish indigenous resistance the Sierra Gorda, and send an expedition headed by José de Escandón to accomplish this. Escandón mostly fought the Chichimeca Jonaz, culminating in the Battle of Media Luna in 1749, when the Chichimeca were decisively defeated. Legend states that at the end of the battle, the Chichimecas and Ximpeces climbed the hill the battle was fought on to commit collective suicide rather than to be integrated into the Spanish order.

In the far north of Querétaro, the Pames were more pacifistic and accepting of Spanish domination. It was these people who the Franciscans were able to group into larger settlements around missions. Although the mission in Jalpan was established before Junípero Serra's 1750 arrival into the region, Serra is given credit for building the five main missions of this area and completing the evangelization of the local people. In reality, the missions were built by Pame hands, under the direction of various Franciscan friars including José Antonio de Murguía in Concá, Juan Crispi in Tilaco, Juan Ramos de Lora in Tancoyol and Miguel de la Campa in Landa. However, the vision for the building of the missions was Serra's, as he imagined a type of utopia based on Franciscan principles. Serra insisted that the missionaries learn the local languages and experience hunger along with the rest of the population. There was still hostility to the Spanish presence, and Serra's response was economic as well as spiritual. The portals of the five main mission churches reflect this vision as well. The style of the five missions is called "Mestizo Baroque" as the indigenous elements are more clearly visible here than in other Baroque structures further south. The Baroque is mostly confined to the portals of the main facades and are meant to function much as an altarpiece, and to teach a world view to the natives of the area. Serra spent eleven years in the Sierra Gorda before moving on in the late 1760s. The missions established in Querétaro would be the first of a long series of missions that would be established as the Spanish made their way north into what is now southern California.

Various uprisings occurred in the area in 1810 as part of the Mexican War of Independence. The town of Jalpan was burned and sacked by royalist forces in 1819.

In the 19th century, the area was still heavily dominated by indigenous people, with small settlements of mestizos and criollos. Conflicts between the indigenous groups and others began at this time over natural resources such as land, water and especially forests. The Sierra Gorda Rebellion began in 1847 by deserters from the Mexican army. The uprising spread to nearly all parts of the Sierra Gorda region from Guanajuato to San Luis Potosí to Veracruz, with the most activity in Santa María del Río, Xichú and Rioverde between 1847 and 1849. The rebels demanded free use of various lands, the abolition of levies, the division of haciendas and the termination of parish church rights to land. Initial efforts by authorities to subdue the uprising were only partially successful. Rebels had control of various cities such as Ciudad Fernández, Rioverde and Santa María del Río by 1849. However, the government caught the most important rebel leader by the name of Quiroz that same year and executed him. This broke the main resistance and the government was able to put much of the rebellion down by 1850.

From Jalpan, General Tomás Mejía led military actions here against the Liberal government installed in the state of Querétaro and the country. He managed to take the main square of Querétaro in 1857. However, at the end of the Reform War, he was executed along with Maximilian I of Mexico.

In 1880, the first major (dirt) road was built through the area to connect it with the capital. This spurred economic development in the region.

Jalpan gained city status in 1904 as it already has electricity, telephone, telegraph and a sugar cane mill.(arqueomex) In 1911, the Grupo Revolucionario Aquiles Serdán was created in Jalpan under Policarpo Olvera and fought with the forces under Francisco I. Madero.

The modern Querétaro-Jalpan highway was built between 1962 and 1970, along with a number of other roads, bridges, electrification and water services.

The economy of the region had remained mostly the same since the colonial period, mostly based on agriculture and livestock. In 1989, this began to change as local residents formed the non governmental organization Grupo Ecológico Sierra Gorda. The group works with environmental education, reforestation and waste management among other things. The group worked to get the biosphere declared in 1997 and has had international support since then. This has spurred ecotourism.

The mission churches of the area suffered damage from the Mexican War of Independence and the Mexican Revolution, and had been all but completely abandoned by the second half of the 20th century. In the 1980s, the churches were "discovered" by a group from INAH from Xilitla. The churches were restored in the 1980s and 1990s, and declared a World Heritage Site in 2003.

Cinnabar and mercury mining has been part of the southern Sierra Gorda since the Pre classic period. This mining remained important until the 1970s, when most of the commercial mines closing and the last, in Maconí, closed in 2000. However, there are still at least six families known to mine the element on a very small scale. According to researchers, the long history of mercury mining here has caused the contamination of the environment as it built up over time. They believe this is behind the high levels of certain chronic diseases in the region. There are plans to build a dam on the Extóraz River, 85 meters tall to store 118 million m^{3} of water. The water would be transported by aqueduct 138 km to the city of Querétaro. However, there is local opposition to the project.

== Missions ==
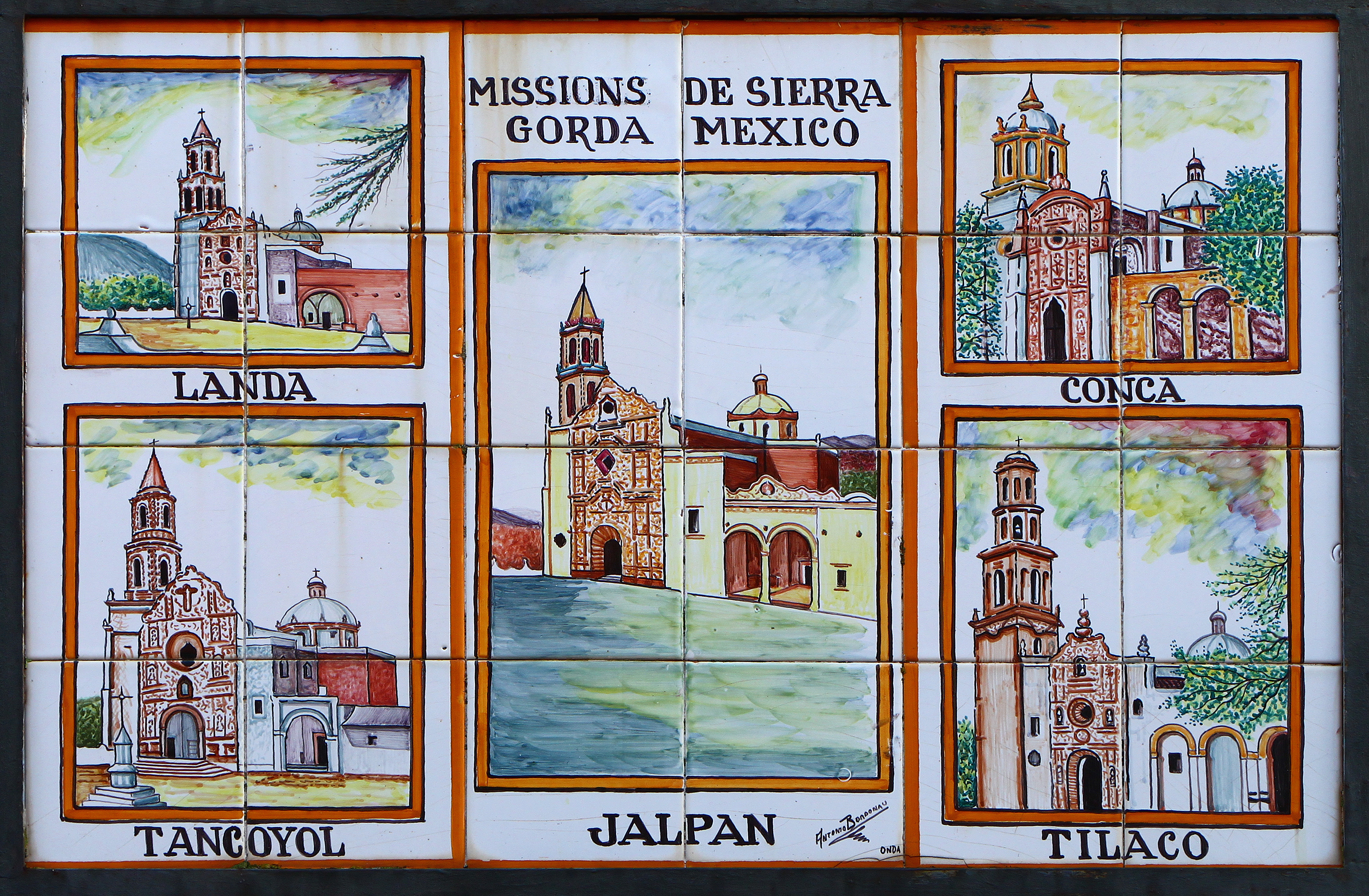
The missions of Sierra Gorda

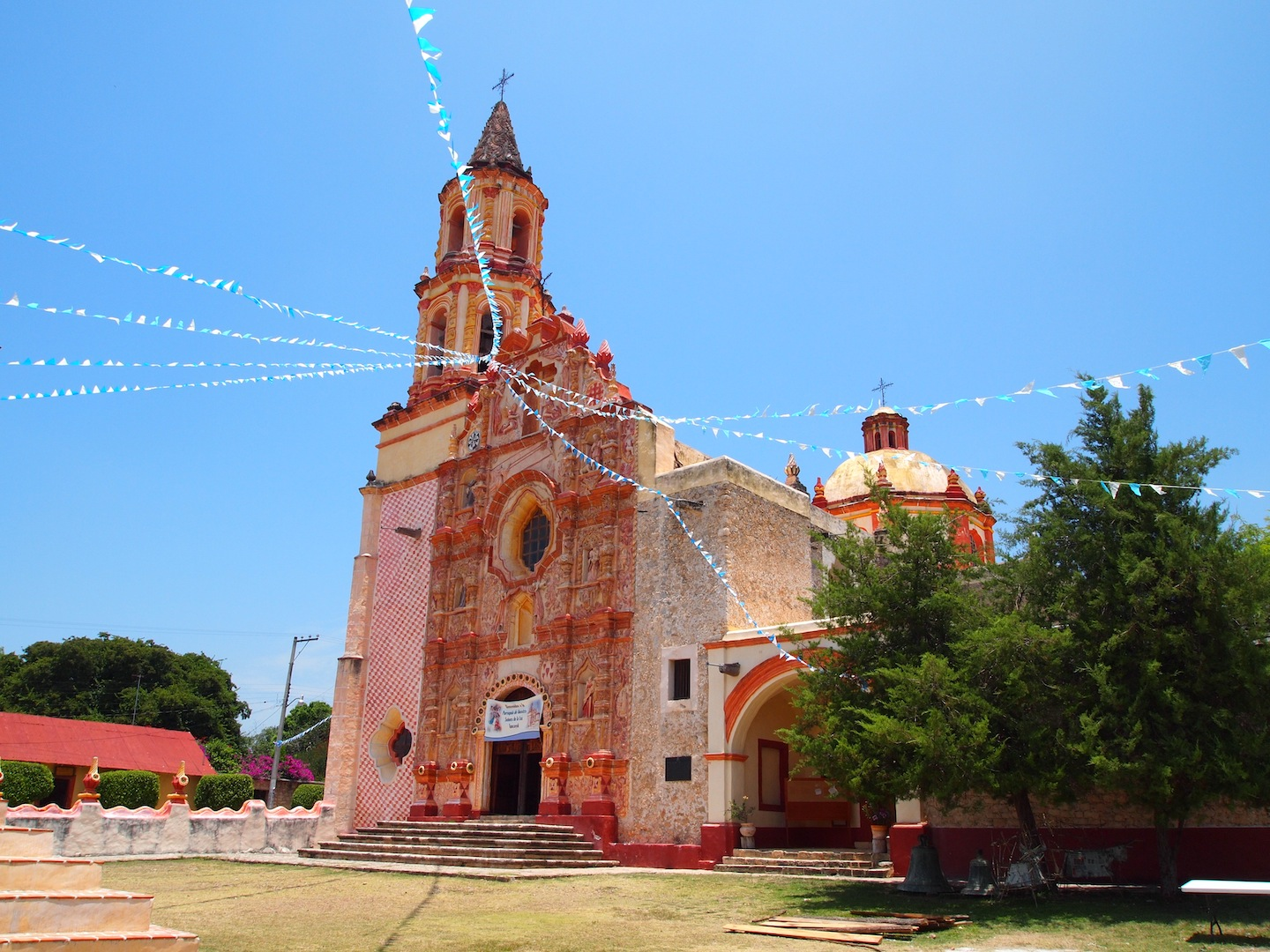
View of Nuestra Señora de la Luz Mission in Tancoyol

During the 16th and 17th century, there were attempts to evangelize the Sierra Gorda of Querétaro by the Augustinians, Franciscans and Dominicans. However, almost all of these missions were never completed or were destroyed soon after they were built by the indigenous communities. The military pacification of the area by José de Escandón in the 1740s allowed for the building of permanent missions in the heart of the Sierra Gorda. However, the five Franciscans missions accredited to Junípero Serra were built in Pame territory, as these people were more accepting of Spanish domination. The placement of the missions had the purpose of dividing the heart of the Sierra Gorda and to open roads into San Luis Potosí. The missions were built by Pame hands, under the direction of various Franciscan friars including José Antonio de Murguía in Concá, Juan Crispi in Tilaco, Juan Ramos de Lora in Tancoyol and Miguel de la Campa in Landa. However, the vision for the building of the missions was Serra's, as he imagined a type of utopia based on Franciscan principles. Serra insisted that the missionaries learn the local languages and experience hunger along with the rest of the population. There was still hostility to the Spanish presence, and Serra's response was economic as well as spiritual.

The main feature of these churches is the ornate decoration of the main portals, although there is decoration on the bell towers and in some churches, other areas as well. This decoration is termed "Mestizo Baroque" or "Mestizo architecture" according to INAH. The ornate decoration is primarily aimed at teaching the new religion to the indigenous peoples, but unlike even the Baroque works further south, indigenous influence is obvious as the Serra's idea was to demonstrate a blending of cultures rather than complete conquest. One element is the use of red, orange, and yellow, including pastel shades, and native sacred figures such as the rabbit and jaguar appear. The mission churches have a single nave, covered by a cannon vault, but each has its own peculiarities, especially in the portals. Serra spent eleven years in the Sierra Gorda before moving on in the late 1760s north.

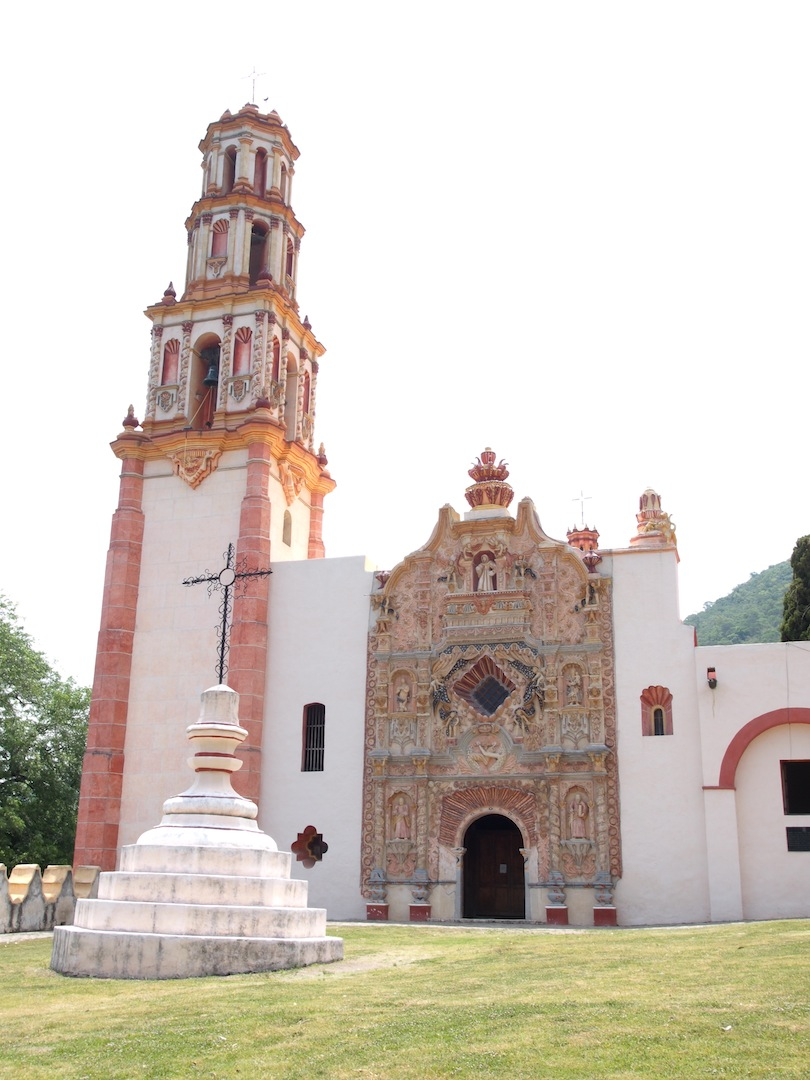
San Francisco Mission in Tilaco

The mission in Jalpan was established before the arrival of Junípero Serra in 1744, but Serra was in charge of building the mission complex that stands today from 1751 to 1758. It is dedicated to the Apostle James, the first evangelist. This complex is situated in the center of the modern town in front of the main plaza and formed by an atrium, cloister, pilgrim portal and church, with a chapel annex on the left side. The original atrium wall was lost, but reconstructed in the same style, with three portals and inverted arches. The main features of the ornate portal on the facade are Our Lady of the Pillar and the Virgin of Guadalupe, both with Mesoamerican connections, as well as a double headed eagle, meant to symbolize the blending of the two cultures.

A second mission is located in the community of Tancoyol called Nuestra Señora de la Luz de Tancoyol, dedicated to Our Lady of Light. This facade has profuse vegetative ornamentation, with ears of corn prominent and is the most elaborate of the five missions. It is likely that this mission was constructed by Juan Ramos de Lora, who resided here from 1761 to 1767. The structure is similar to those in Jalpan and Landa. It has a church with a Latin cross layout and choir area, a sacristy, atrium with cross and chapels in the corners of the atrium called "capillas posas". There is also a pilgrims' gate, a cloister and quarters for the priest. The interior has a number of sculptures including one of "Our Lady of Light".

The facade consists of three bodies, a pediment and four estípite columns. The lower body has sculptures of Saints Peter and Paul and who Franciscan coats of arms. The second body has sculptures of Joachem and Saint Anne, with the Virgin Mary in her arms, and a niche in the center. There are also images from the Passion such as nails and a lance. This niche contained an image of Our Lady of Light, but it is empty now. Between the second and third bodies, there is a large window and above it, a representation of the stigmata of Francis of Assisi. The pediment contains a large cross in relief of two styles related to the Franciscan and Dominican orders. The bell tower is narrow and the baptistery is at the base of this tower. On the lower part appears a small window which illuminates the baptistery. The cupola of the tower is in a pyramid shape with a Baroque iron cross on top. Indigenous influence is noted in the interior columns of the church, which have images of a jaguar and a person with Olmec features.

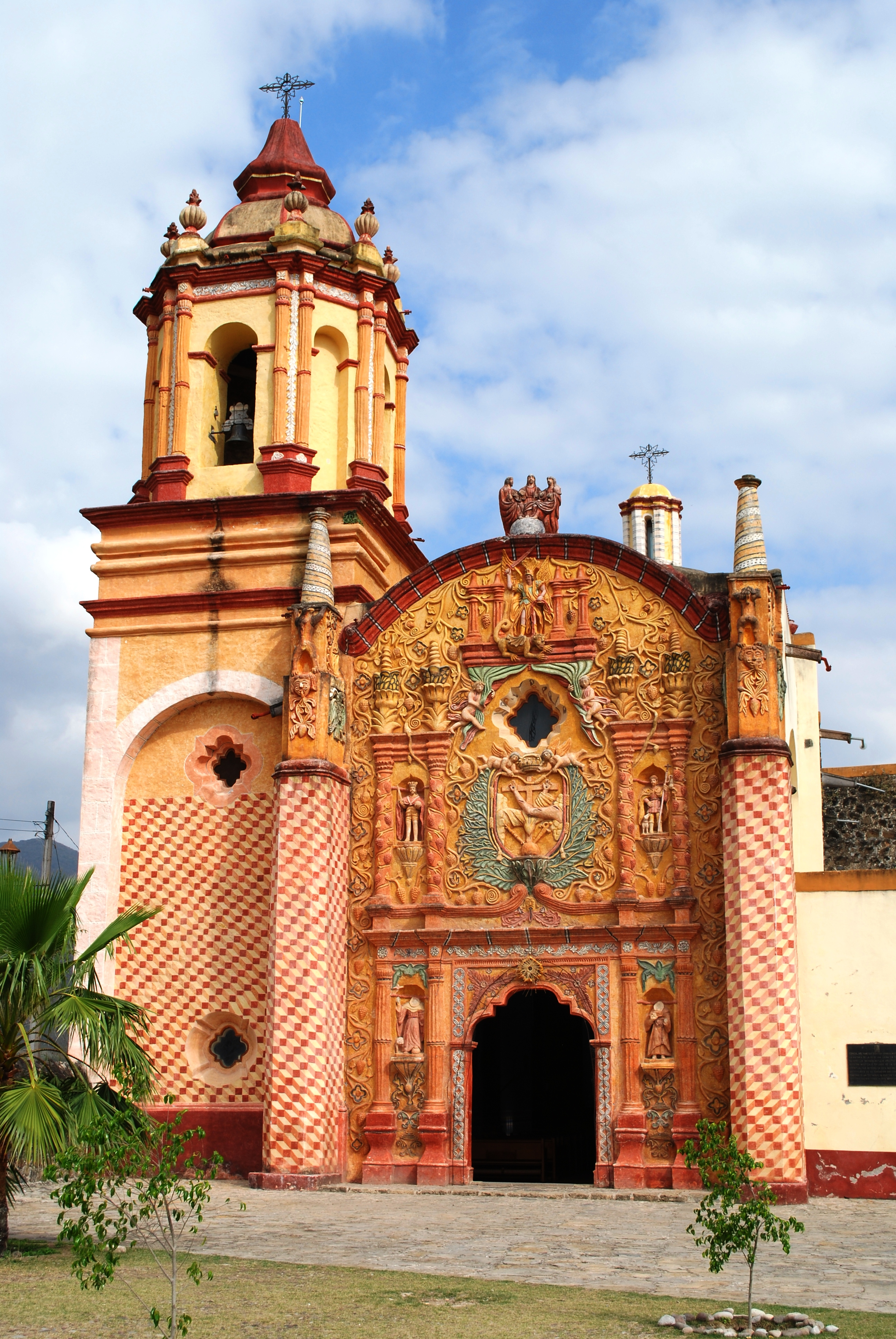
Mission of San Miguel Concá

San Miguel Concá is located forty km from Jalpan on Highway 69 to Río Verde. The church is in the center of the community on one side of Guerrero Street. It is oriented to the south and dedicated to the Archangel Michael. It is the smallest of the mission churches and was probably finished in 1754, according to an inscription located inside the church. Concá is a Pame word which means "with me". The decoration is mestizo as well with large flowers, foliage and coarse figures in indigenous style. It is distinguished by an image of the Holy Trinity at the crest along with a rabbit and double-headed eagle. San Francisco del Valle de Tilaco is a small community eighteen km northeast of Landa de Matamoros. It was constructed between 1754 and 1762 by Juan Crespi and dedicated to Francis of Assisi. It has some characteristics different from the other missions. First, it is built on a gradient. The bell tower is separated from the main nave of the church by the baptistery and structurally functions as a buttress for the church. Tilaco is the best conserved of the five missions and has the most subtle ornamentation on its facade. Its facades are composed of three horizontal and three vertical partitions, with the Franciscan coat of arms prominent over the main entrance. In Tilaco, the facade has small angels, ears of corn and a strange large jar over which is an image of Francis of Assisi. One distinctive decorative element is four mermaids with indigenous features. Tilaco has the best conserved atrium corner chapels called "capillas posas", which were used for processions.

Santa María del Agua de Landa is located twenty km from Jalpan on Highway 120 towards Xilitla. The mission was built between 1760 and 1768 by Miguel de la Campa is dedicated to Our Lady of the Immaculate Conception, which gives rise to part of the community's name. It was the last of the missions to be built. The atrium is bordered by a wall and centered by a cross, and paved in stone. It is noted for its equilibrium in composition and very narrow bell tower, which is integrated into the facade. The sculpture of this facade is considered to be the best of the five according to Arqueología Mexicana magazine. The faces of the mermaids at Landa have indigenous features.

Junípero Serra spent eight years on the project of building the missions until 1770. When a number of historical events, including the expulsion of the Jesuits, forced the abandonment of the missions. Serra moved on to California. When Serra left, the missions were left in the hands of regular clergy. During both the Mexican War of Independence and the Mexican Revolution, the missions suffered sacking and destruction. Initial restoration work to the outside of the mission churches was begun in the 1980s. Between 1991 and 1997, interior work on altars, choirs, organs and paintings was done. Further work was sponsored by the state between 1997 and 2002. Work done in the 1990s also included that on surrounding plazas and monuments. The effort to inscribe the missions as a World Heritage Site began in 2000 and was ultimately successful in 2003, when it was added during the 27th meeting of the World Heritage Committee.

== Archeological sites ==
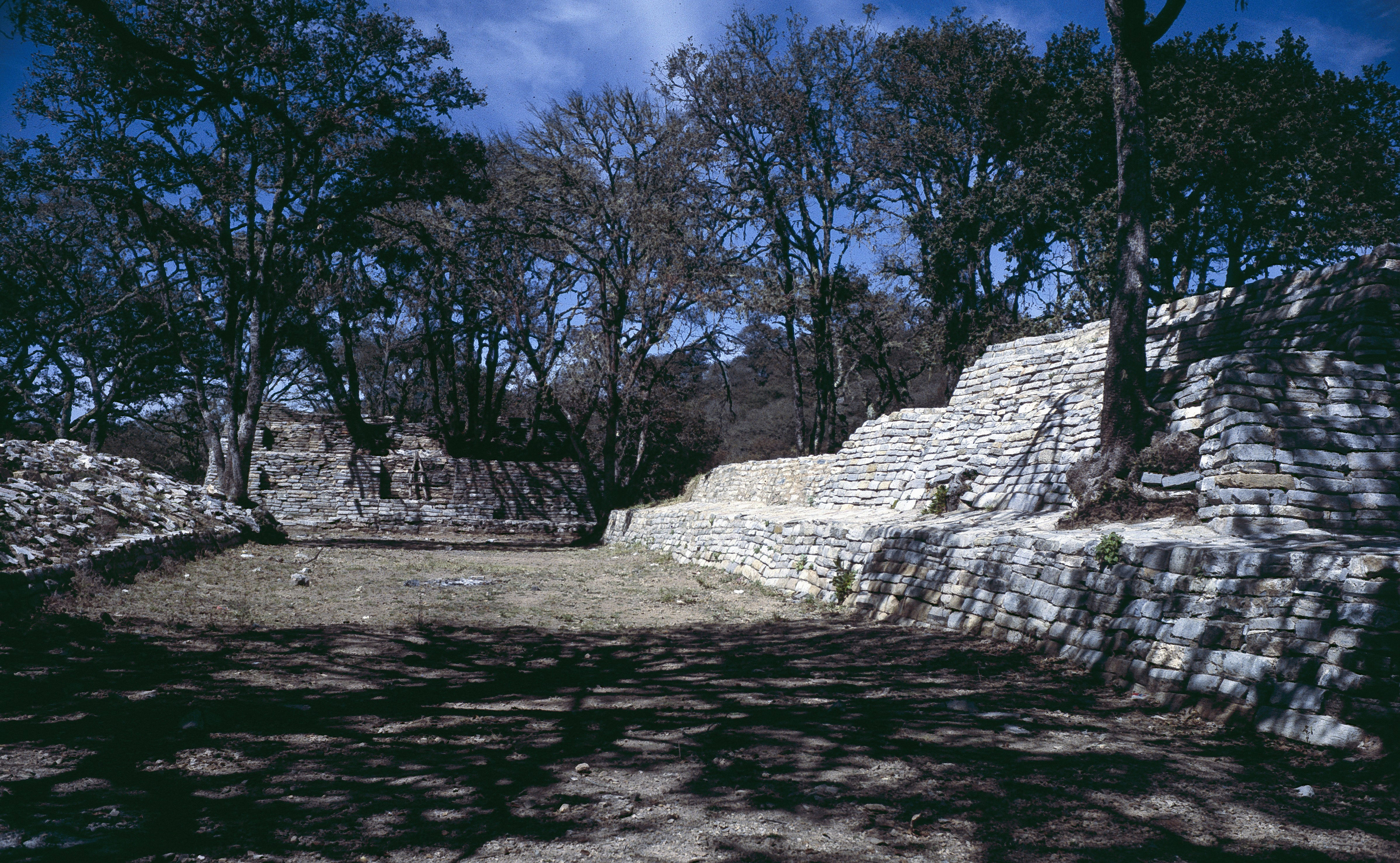
Las Ranas

At the end of the Preclassic, most of the Sierra Gorda was populated by agricultural villages established by people who migrated here from the Mexican Plateau and Gulf of Mexico coast, mostly from the latter. Agriculture was concentrated in the lower valley areas, the few plains and some sides of mountains. This also included the cutting of forests to make more agricultural land. Most settlements are found near springs, ponds and small lakes as they were the most readily usable sources of water, instead of the rivers which ran deep inside narrow canyons. Settlements were ranked in importance according to their function, with Las Ranas and Toluquillo occupying the most important positions.

The height of settlement of the area came between the 6th and 10th centuries, with the largest number of successful human settlements, with an economy based on farming and mining. The pre Hispanic architecture of the area is best developed in the major urban centers. These cities are centered on a Mesoamerican ball court which then opens up to various plazas and monumental structures on pyramid bases. Other structures such as administrative buildings and residences are found in both squared and round forms, but most often with a talud topped by a cornice. As many cities were situated on top of hills, the leveling of terraces to create space is another distinctive feature. However, while stucco was used on some floors, there is no evidence of walls being covered in it, as seen further south. The mining of cinnabar required coordinated and hierarchical labor practices for the various tasks involved, which would lead to the development of the cities of Las Ranas and Toluquilla. This area was the primary provider of this red pigment to Mesoamerica.

The pottery of the area was influenced by the mineral deposits of the area for coloring and Olmec based influences coming from the east of the area. One strong example of both is the production of what is called "black Olmec pottery". There is little known about the religious beliefs of this area, as few symbols have been found to identify deities or religious calendar. Burials do indicate a belief in life after death, as interred individuals, sometimes sacrificed, are found in a fetal position. Grave goods include many objects used in life as well as containers which may have contained food.

Aracheology in the Sierra Gorda began just before the second half of the 19th century, when mine engineers reported archeological finds in the mountains. Several of these engineers organized expeditions, some with state support, which resulted in the mapping of sites such as Las Ranas and Toluquillo. These expeditions also include the first photographs of these sites. The discovery of these two cities generated academic interest, but they were not further explored until 1931, when archeologist Eduardo Noguera and architect Emilio Cuevas went to evaluate the sites for the Direction of Pre Hispanic Monuments. By 1939, twenty seven sites had been identified in Querétaro, with twenty three in the Sierra Gorda. There are over 400 archeological sites, with twenty six primary ones, Ahuacatlán, Arroyo Seco, Arquitos, Canoas, Cerro de la Campana, Cerro del Sapo, Concá, Deconí, Ecatitlán, El Doctor, La Colonia, La Plazuela, Lobo, Los Moctezumas, Pueblo Viejo, Purísima, Ranas, Sabino, San Juan, Soyatal, Tancama, Tancoyol, Tilaco, Toluquilla, Tonatico and Vigas.

From an anthropological perspective, Querétaro, especially the northeast, is of great interest because of the cultures which developed and disappeared here as well as its connections with Mesoamerica and cultures to the north, but knowledge of the region is limited. It is possible that the peoples of the area had cultural and economic contacts as far north as Casas Grandes, and what is now New Mexico and Arizona. The mummy of a girl was found in a cave near the community of Altamira in the municipality of Cadereyta de Montes which shows evidence of agricultural settlement in an area that today does not support it. The semi desert conditions that currently prevail in most of the Sierra Gorda dates from climate change that occurred at the end of the first millennia CE, which dried the area and probably put an end to city and dominion development.

Las Ranas and Toluquilla were the two largest prehispanic cities to develop in the Sierra Gorda area. Las Ranas was the most developed city from the 7th to the 11th century, with Toluquilla somewhat smaller and reaching its height in the 11th century. Both cities are near to each other and both controlled the active trade routes of the area as well as the mining of cinnabar, highly prized as a red pigment in Mesoamerica. The trade that passed through the area linked the Gulf of Mexico to the central Mexican Plateau and some areas north as well. Extensive mining was done at both Toluquilla and Las Ranas beginning between 200 and 300 CE, extracting cinnabar, mercury and sulfur. Cinnabar was the most prized used in funerals. The structures at the sites indicate a stratified society and built with stone slabs and mud and covered in stucco in some places. At Toluquilla, many structures were built on terraces cut into the mountain to create more space. Las Ranas was taken over by the Chichimeca Jonaz late in its history but by the time the Spanish arrived, both cities were abandoned. In 2009, INAH and other institutions carried out research at Toluquilla on thirty skeletons from the pre Hispanic era in order to determine the importance of mining in the south of the Sierra Gorda. The objective of the study was to determine the amount of accumulation of mercury in the bones to find out who was most involved in the mining and how it affected the health of the population. It also studies patterns of mercury contamination in the surrounding environment as well. There have been over eighty extraction sites for cinnabar found around Las Ranas and Toluquilla, which lie on one of the largest deposits of the mineral in Mexico.

The archaeological study of mining by the Sierra Gorda Project was begun in the 1970s, based on an earlier interdisciplinary study carried out at the Sierra de Querétaro. The project was supported by the federal and state governments as well as UNAM. The project further mapped the cities of Las Ranas and Toluqillo. Further studies in the 1980s consolidated earlier findings and worked out settlement patterns in the wider area. Continued work at that time classified the ancient cultures and register more than 500 sites, encompassing all of northern Querétaro and into San Luis Potosí. The effect of mercury poisoning is not only an ancient problem but a modern one as well. These studies are also investigating the high levels of certain chronic diseases in the current population. The theory is that there is widespread mercury contamination in the environment because of it build up from mining for over hundreds of years.

== Bibliography ==
- Jimenez Gonzalez, Victor Manuel, ed. (2009). Guanajuato: Guia para descubrir los encantos del Guanajuato [Guanajuato: Guide to discover the charms of Guanajuato] (in Spanish). Mexico City: Editorial Oceano de Mexico SA de CV.
