= Pinal de Amoles =

Pinal de Amoles, Querétaro
- Town
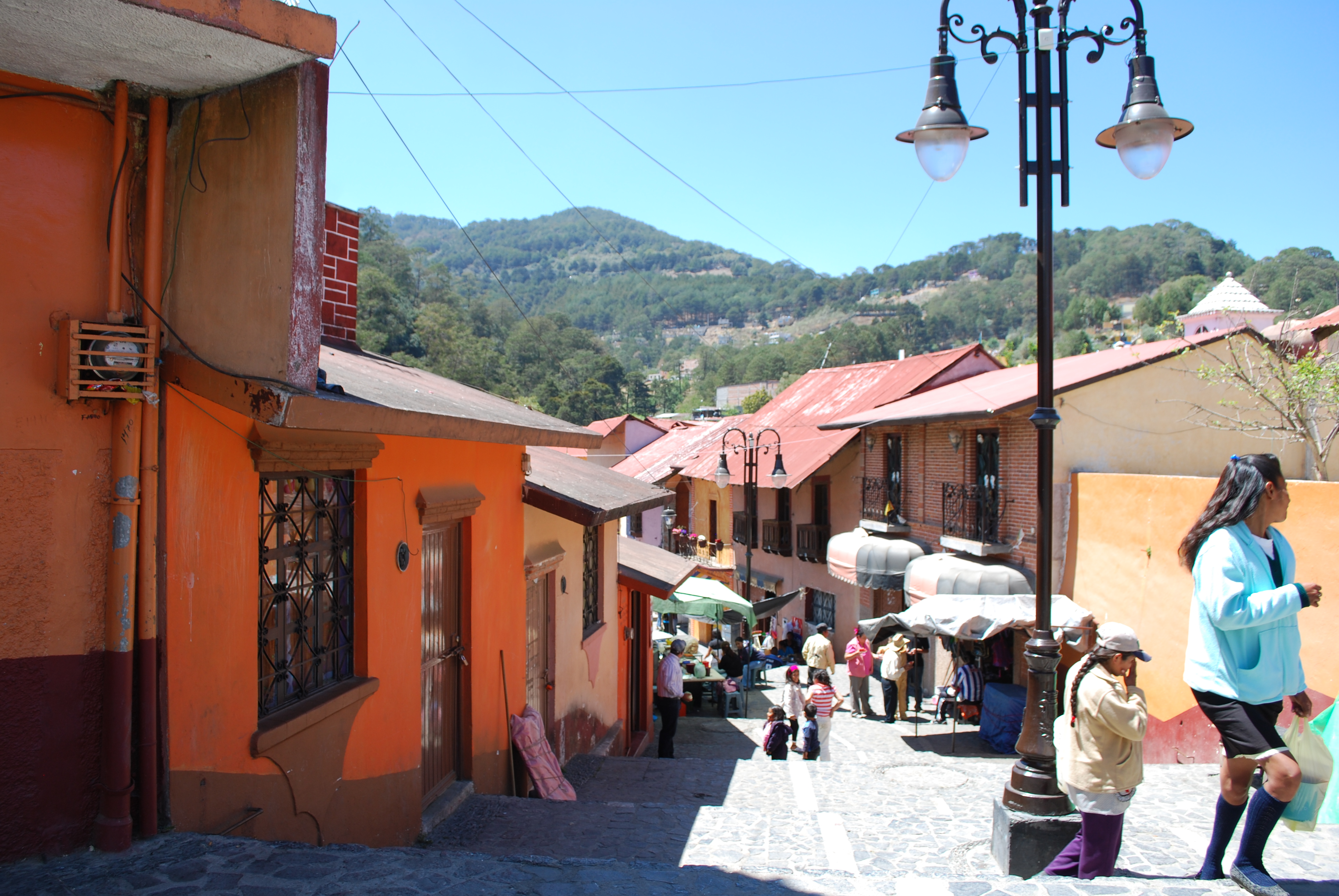
- Overlooking a street in the center of Pinal de Amoles

- Location in Mexico Pinal de Amoles, Querétaro (Mexico)
- Coordinates: 21°08′03″N 99°27′31″W
- Country: Mexico
- State: Querétaro
- Founded: 1606
- Municipal Status: 1932

Government

Area
  - Total: 705.3698 km^{2} (272.3448 sq mi)
- Elevation (of seat): 2,400 m (7,900 ft)

Population (2005) Municipality
  - Total: 25,325
  - Seat: 1,525
- Time zone: UTC-6 (Central (US Central))
- Postal code (of seat): 76300
- Area code: 441
- Website: www.pinaldeamoles.gob.mx (in Spanish)

Pinal de Amoles is a town located in Pinal de Amoles Municipality in the state of Querétaro in central Mexico. It is part of the Sierra Gorda region which stretches over northern Querétaro into Guanajuato, Hidalgo and San Luis Potosí, with 88% of the municipality's land comprising the Sierra Gorda Biosphere Reserve. The municipality contains large areas of forests and the highest peaks in the region, which separate the wetter areas of both the north and east from the drier areas of the south and west. The town began as a mining camp in the 17th century. However, most mining in the area has disappeared and the municipality is one of the poorest in Mexico, despite recent efforts to promote ecotourism and restart mining. This has led a large number of residents to migrate to larger cities in Mexico and to the United States to work, sending remittances back home. These remittances now overshadow the locally generated economy.

In 2023, Pinal de Amoles was designated a Pueblo Mágico by the Mexican government, recognizing its cultural and historical importance.

== The town ==
The town of Pinal de Amoles, was founded as Real de San José de Amoles, in the early 17th century as a mining camp. Today, much of that mining has disappeared, but the town remains. It is located 153 km north of the state capital, straddling Federal Highway 120, which connects it to San Juan del Río in the south and the state of San Luis Potosí in the north. The town located at an altitude of 2,320 meters above sea level, on small flat spaces on a mountain with a population of 1,582 (2005). For this reason, it has narrow winding streets and many inclines. Most of the streets are of cobblestone and many houses are painted red, ochre or yellow, with colorful balconies. There is no municipal market but the traditional tianguis is held on Sundays. This features basic products, especially locally produced fruits and vegetables in season. It also features locally produced coffee and breads such as pan de pulque (pulque bread).

The town center consists of a very small plaza which fronts the local parish church of San José, dedicated to Saint Joseph. The San José Church was begun in 1770 and inaugurated in 1771. It has a simple design with a traditional pediment on its facade. On the right hand side, there is a bell tower with three levels.

The town and the immediate surroundings include numerous hotels, several of which also operate cabins in the nearby mountain areas. Local food specialties include cecina, pacholes (toasted sweets made from corn), tamales with cheese, gorditas, pan de pulque, barbacoa, wines and liquors made from various fruits, pulque and aguamiel.

Because of its altitude and fairly abundant rainfall, the climate is primarily cold, with fog not being uncommon. It is surrounded by forests, canyons, arroyos, waterfalls and green fields.

== History ==
Pinal is Spanish and means "pine forest." "Amoles" is from the Nahuatl amolli – a name of a root often used as a detergent. The municipality's seal contains an amolli, along with an eagle with its wings extended to signify hospitality. There are branches and four pine cones to represent the various conifers that grow abundantly in the area, the Cerro de Media Luna mountain and a pick and shovel to represent the area's past of mining silver, mercury, gold, antimony and other metals. A cross and sword represents the Spanish conquest and evangelization. The date of 1932 signifies the establishment of the municipality. The date of 19 March 1606 represents the founding of the Spanish town.

The first inhabitants of the region were hunter-gatherers as early as 6000 BC. Starting from the 13th century groups of Pames and Chichimeca Jonaz came to the area. Communities of these groups were still found in areas such as El Cuervo, Puerto de Vigas, El Rodezno, Tonatico, Escanela and others when the Spanish arrived in the 16th century. Starting from 1534, the Spanish established the province of Xilotepec, which encompassed much of the land around what is now the Sierra Gorda in Querétaro, but it did not manage to dominate this area for centuries because of the fierce resistance of the native peoples, especially the Chichimeca Jonaz. However, the Spanish penetrated the area for evangelization, military purposes and prospecting. The first mine was in Escanelas in 1599. Pinal de Amoles, initially called Real de San José de Amoles, was established in 1606. It was named an Alcaldía Mayor Real with official jurisdiction over what is now the municipalities of Arroyo Seco, Jalpan de Serra, Landa de Matamoros, Pinal de Amoles, San Joaquín, Peñamiller and Cadereyta de Montes. However, this seat of government would be transferred to Cadereyta as the silver from the mines dwindled by 1675. However, this Alcaldía Mayor would form over half of the future state of Querétaro.

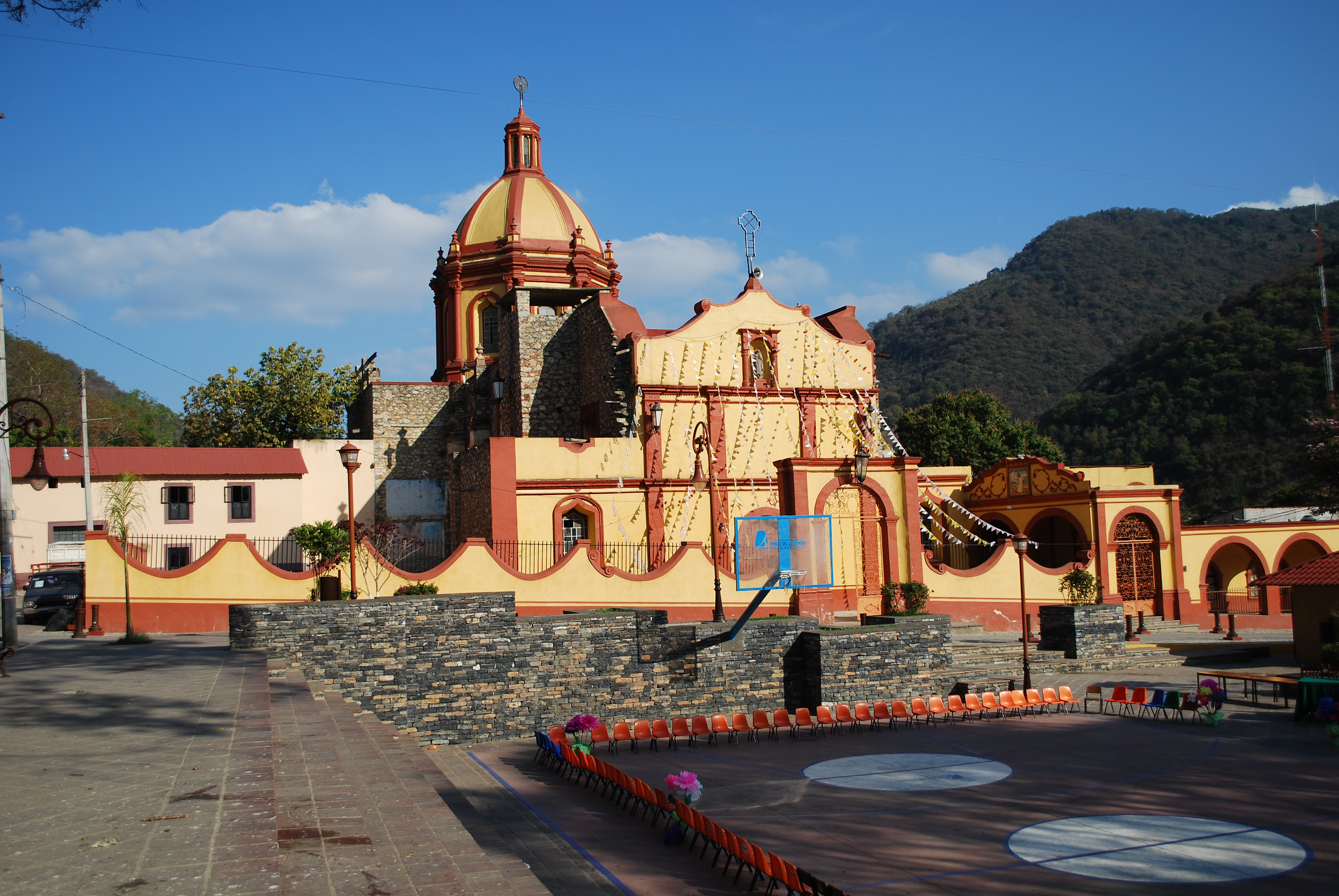
Mission church of Ahuacatlán

Another tactic the Spanish used to try and dominate the region was the establishment of missions to convert the indigenous peoples to Catholicism. The mission at Ahuacatlán was founded in 1693 by the Dominicans.

Complete Spanish domination would come in the mid 18th century, with the defeat of the Chichimeca Jonaz at the Battle of Media Luna, which took place in the municipality. To consolidate this hold, Spanish missionaries under Junípero Serra established five Franciscan missions in the heart of the Chichimeca Sierra Gorda just to the north of Pinal de Amoles, in Jalpan de Serra and other municipalities. As municipality's settlements grew, new churches were established. The church of San Jose was constructed in 1770. The Bucarieli Mission was founded by Guadalupe Soriano in 1775. He also built the church at San Antonio Escanelilla.

After Mexico's independence, most of the area's mines gave out, eliminating the base of most of the area's economy. Since then, Pinal de Amoles and the rest of the Sierra Gorda in Querétaro would remain underdeveloped compared to the rest of the state. The district of Jalpan was founded in 1825 which included Arroyo Seco, Landa de Matamoros, Jalpan and Pinal de Amoles. During the second half of the 19th century, this district began to subdivide. First the municipality of Ahuacatlán de Guadalupe separated from Jalpan de Serra in 1866, and included Pinal de Amoles, San Pedro Escanela and Bucareli. It would then become a sub prefecture of Jalpan, with government offices moved to Pinal de Amoles in 1894. Other government reorganization included the naming of Pinal de Amoles as a “municipal presidencia” in 1914, Pinal de Amoles was officially declared a town and San Antonio Escanellilla becoming a sub delegation in 1924. The municipality's current status as a free municipality came in 1932, with Ahuacatlán, San Antonio Escanelilla, San Pedro Escanela and Bucareli as delegations. In 1944, the delegation of Santa Águeda de Pusunguía was added.

While mining declined after Independence, it never ceased completely and there were various operations in the 19th and 20th centuries. En English company installed itself to mine silver in Pinal de Amoles in 1865. A Mexican company was founded in 1887 for the same purpose. A US company called El Soyatal began mining antimony in 1944. Mercury mining began again in 1960, which caused an economic boom, but by 1970, prices for this element fell and ended most of the mining here.

In 2001, the state taxation authority identified major irregularities with the public records of Pinal de Amoles with up to eight million pesos missing.

Ecological projects such as those to clean the waters in local canyons were begun between 2001 and 2003. In 2007, a sewerage treatment plant was inaugurated in Ahuacatlán, mostly paid for by the state and federal governments. The goal of the plant is to prevent contamination of waters in the Escanela, Chuveje and Ahuacatlán Rivers, which lead to the Jalpan Dam.

== Environment ==
Like the rest of the Sierra Gorda region, Pinal de Amoles is marked by very rugged terrain, which includes canyons and steep mountains. The area is located in an area with extremely high peaks with small flat areas and mesas. The altitude varies between 839masl at the community of Huajales to 3350masl at the Cerro de la Calentura, which is also the highest point in the state. Eighty eight percent of the municipality's territory belongs to the Sierra Gorda Biosphere Reserve of Querétaro, a region which is protected because of its extreme diversity of landscapes, climates, vegetation and wildlife. Pinal de Amoles represents the highest peaks of this region, which essentially separate the wetter lands to the north and east from the semi arid areas of the south and west as the mountains block moisture coming in from the Gulf of Mexico. Most of the rock is sedimentary, with about 45% limestone. About 15% is intrusive volcanic rock. This due to the fact that much of the Sierra Gorda was sea bed millions of years ago, with volcanic activity later in its geological history. The volcanic rock accounts for most of the municipality's minable deposits.

Rivers are fast flowing due to the geography. The two most important rivers are the Extoraz in the south flowing east and El Rodezno or Río Escanela, which flows past Escanela, Escanelila and Ahuacatlán, emptying into the Jalpan Dam. There are also 169 bodies of surface water which include 143 fresh water springs, six small dams and 20 streams.

In the entire region, the coldest temperatures occur between December and January, with high temperatures in April and May. Temperatures vary widely depending on altitude with an annual average of 13C in the higher elevations such as Pinal de Amoles to 24C in lower areas such as Jalpan. In the highest elevations, frosts and freezes are not uncommon.

The north of the municipality is dominated by deciduous rainforest, which loses much of its leaves in the dry season. The center and northwest are dominated by pine and oak forests. Pine and holm oak forests are found mostly above 2,000 masl. The forests of the municipality are its most important natural resource. The types of wildlife is very varied and includes white-tailed deer, pumas, tigrillos (Leopardus tigrinus or Leopardus wiedii), bobcats, coyotes, raccoons, opossums, armadillos, foxes, skunks, hares and rabbits. Birds are especially varied and include woodpeckers, American goldfinches, sparrows, parrots, macaws and ravens. Reptiles include rattlesnakes and coral snakes as well as “river shrimp” or acamaya. A group of researchers from the Natural Sciences Faculty of the Universidad Autónoma de Querétaro have discovered a new species of crustacean similar to a very large shrimp or small lobster in the municipality. The crustacean is found in fresh water mostly in the Platanos Arroyo and can grow to a size of up to eight centimeters. Locally, the creature is called an “acocil” or freshwater lobster, like other creatures found in other parts of Mexico. However, studies have shown that this crustacean show enough peculiarities to warrant it as a separate species. The formal name for it is Procambarus Yacoy.

There three main types of climate. The first is temperate and humid, with rains in the summer and an average annual temperature of between 12 and 18C. There is little rain in the winter but the annual average is about 850mm. This climate prevails at altitudes over 2,000 masl. There is a semi hot and dry climate in areas with average annual temperatures between 18 and 22C with rains in the summer and little rain in winter. Average annual precipitation is about 500mm. Areas with a semi hot and humid climates have similar rainfall patterns but with an average rainfall of just under 1000mm. Summers here are hot and humid. Like in the rest of the Sierra Gorda, the coldest temperatures occur between December and January, with high temperatures in April and May. In the highest elevations, many of which are in Pinal de Amoles, frosts, freezes and even snow are not uncommon. Recent significant freezes, frosts and snows have occurred in 2007 and 2010 with very high altitude communities such as San Gaspar most affected. The ice and snow make driving dangerous on Highway 120, as it has an abundance of curves. This can form “black ice” which is an invisible layer of ice over the earth, which can lower air temperatures further. The government works to help poorer communities deal with the cold conditions year with advisories. In 2010, the Sierra Gorda had it first significant snowfall in eighteen years in the municipality, with temperatures of -4C. In some places, the cover was 15 cm deep.

Most of the municipality is covered in forest of one type or another, and these forests are its main natural resource. These forests have been having problems in recent years between insect and parasitic plant infestations and logging. The infestations have been more severe than usual because of drought conditions weakening trees. While there are strict environmental laws for the area as part of the biosphere reserve, enforcement is spotty. The forests of this and neighboring municipalities have attracting illegal logging from those outside the area. Pinal de Amoles is one of the Sierra Gorda municipalities where this problem is the most serious.

In 2005, a road was built between El Llano de Huaxquilico to San Pedro Escanela, but it is controversial because of environmental concerns. Its building caused severe ecological damage in an area considered to be one of the most sensitive in the Sierra Gorda Biosphere Reserve, as it is where most of the local aquifers recharge. The area receives a large amount of rain, which has led to damage and mudslides affecting the road, making it almost impossible for more than one car to pass at a time.

The rugged terrain of the area gives rise to a number of waterfalls, forests, canyons, springs and other natural attractions. El Chuveje is one of the largest waterfalls in the state, measuring about thirty meters high and with a strong steady fall of water surrounded by mountains and vegetation. Activities include hiking, camping and bird watching with macaws and white tailed deer still to be seen although there are fewer than in the past. The waterfall is located a couple of kilometers from the park entrance and can only be reached by foot. The El Salto waterfall is located in San Pedro Escanela, with a height of 35 meters. The water falls into a clear pond at the foot of the elevation then forms a small river. It is not easy to reach and recommended only for experienced hikers. The Puente de Dios (Bridge of God) is a natural bridge located on the side of a small mountain near the Peña de la Gloria. The site of the bridge is a deep crevasse with thick vegetation and under the bridge a river with two small waterfalls flows. The La Angostura Canyon is about fifty meters long and contains part of the Escanela River, the same that passes through the Puente de Dios and then empties into the Ayutla River. The canyon contains several places where the water pools and are suitable for swimming in the summer. The Infiernillo Arroyo is found within a kilometer long canyon. In the lower part, there are various pools of blue water along with small waterfalls. Around these is thick vegetation.

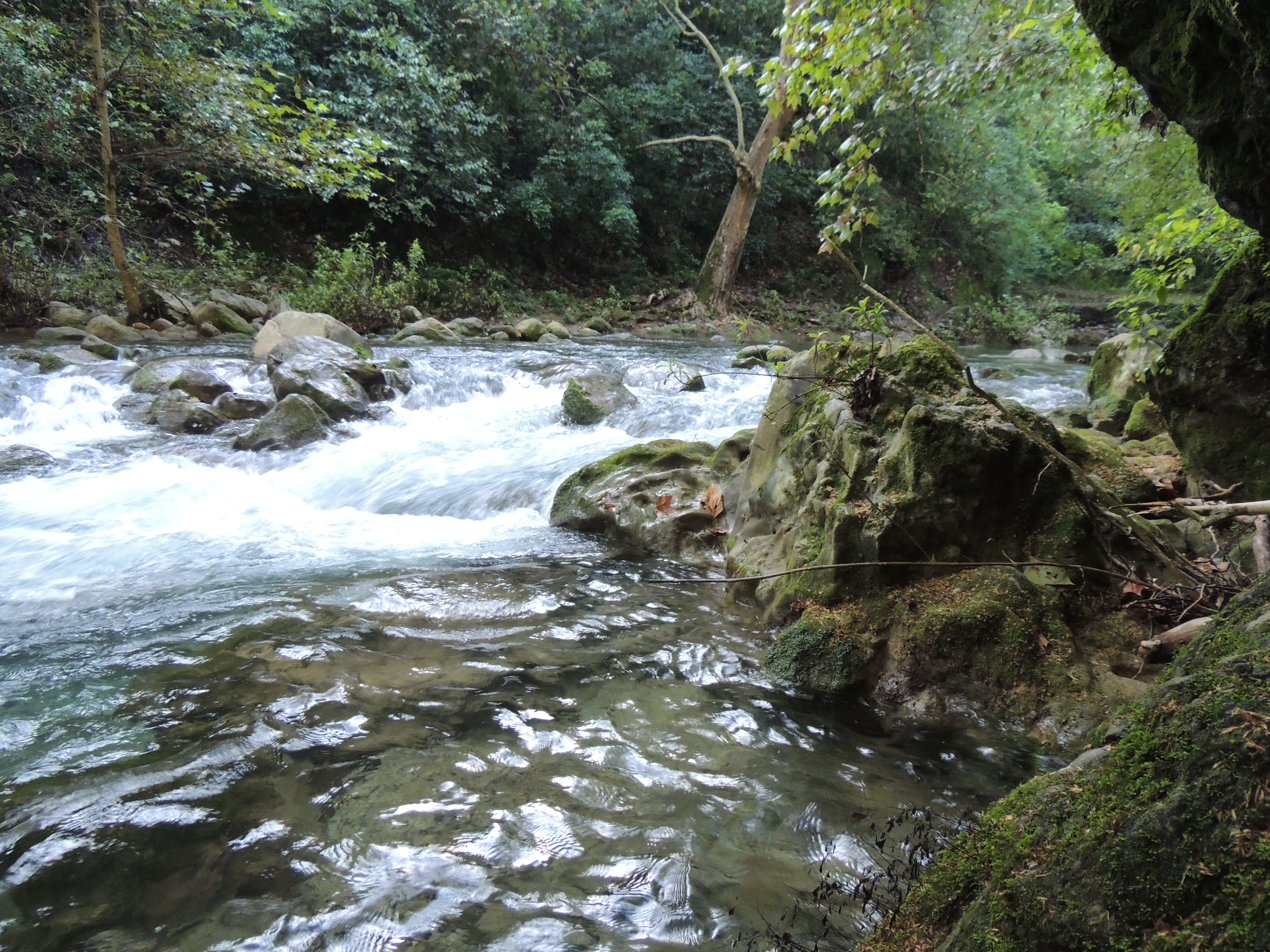
Sideview of Puente de Dios River, Pinal de Amoles, Querétaro, México

The Barranca Arroyo is a small canyon structure about an hour and a half from the municipal seat. The water flows year round with several areas where it pools, but the water is cold. The area is surrounded by large mountains with abundant vegetation. There is camping, hiking and picnicking. The Peña de la Viuda is a natural monolith which falls directly into an arroyo. The area has abundant vegetation, and activities such as skiing, camping and hiking. La Escondida is an area in mountainous forest with a permanent fresh water spring. It permits camping and hiking. El Cidral is an area with cedar trees surrounding a clearing for camping and hiking. The Peña de la Glora waterfall is surrounded by thick vegetation. The lowest part has a natural spring and the upper part has a deep, unexplored cave. The Cueva de los Riscos (Cave of the Crags) is named after the crags which appear in various of its chambers. The entrance begins with a rocky descent then levels out to an area with sand. The center has a hillock with looks like a monolith rock. This can be climbed to observe the various crags with contain ice. One of these in the shape of a pulpit and another is called the “bell tower” because if it is struck it sounds like a bell.

== Culture ==
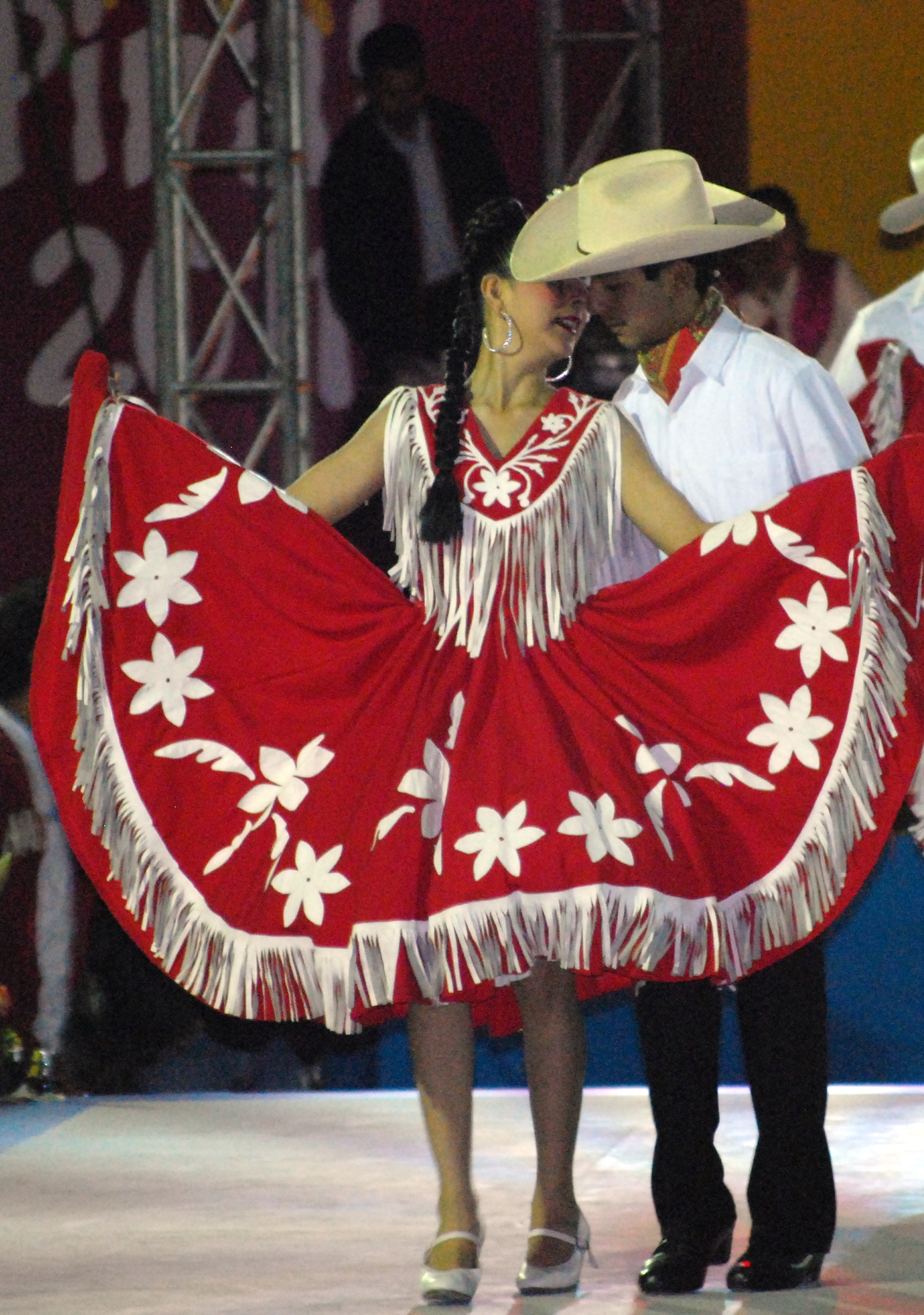
Dancers at the 2011 Concurso Nacional de Bailes Huapango

Each of the major communities of the municipalities have their annual festival, set on the day of their patron saint. These include Pinal de Amoles (March 16–19), San Pedro Escanela, (May 1–5 and June 27–29), Ahuacatlán de Guadalupe (December 12), Santa Águeda (February 5), Bucareli (October 4 and December 8) and Escaelilla (June 13). Municipality wide there is the annual “La Molienda” from the beginning of February to the middle of March. This is related to the harvest of sugar cane although nowadays, there are fewer fields that grow this crop. The tradition includes cutting a cane to extract its juice in a press or mill. With the juice boiled down and the remaining dry cane used as fuel or animal feed. The boiled sugar cane juice is made into a syrup, which is then molded into small pillars called piloncillos.

Pinal de Amoles, like the rest of the Sierra Gorda, has been classified as the far west of the La Huasteca region. Huapango is a tradition in the Sierra Gorda and the people here identify themselves as part of the La Huasteca region, according to Jorge Enrique Resendíz Martínez, municipal president of Pinal de Amoles. This Huasteca influence is best seen in the tradition of Huapango music and dance, which is strongest here and in other Sierra Gorda communities such as Xichú and San Joaquín, where there are festivals dedicated to it. Huapango musicians from Pinal de Amoles are noted for their ability to improvise melodies and lyrics, but the main event for the year is the Concurso Nacional de Bailes de Huapango held each year in the municipal seat in March.

2011 marked the twenty second annual event, which originally was called the Concuso Nacional de Baile de Huapango y Reunión de las Huastecas. In this year, there were more than 400 couples registered in the competition with about 10,000 spectators in attendance, as the event grows each year. The event is held at the Casa de la Cultura (House of Culture), with three categories: children's (under 12), youth (13 to 17) and adult (over 18). Entrance fee is 100 pesos per couple. Various styles of Huapango dance is presented including hidalguense, poblano, potosino, queretano, tamaulipeco and veracruzano, named after the states of Hidalgo, Puebla, San Luis Potosí, Querétaro, Tamaulipas and Veracruz respectively. It begins on Friday night and concludes on Sunday night. The children's category is exposition only, with the other two having eliminations. The judging panels are made up of representatives of these states, who qualify technique, dress, projection, coordination and precision. The winners of various categories received between four and six thousand pesos, with the overall winner for each age group receiving between 14,000 and 20,000 pesos. Those couples who have won the grand prize in previous years are not allowed to participate again together. For 2011, the groups presenting live music for the event included Los Hidalguenses, Reales de Colima and Huapangueros Differentes. The event is concurrent with the Fiestas Patronales or feast day of the patron saint of the municipality. This event in 2011 featured popular rock groups such as Pambo Pop-rock and Pega Pega de Emilio Reyna.

== Economy ==
Only just over eighteen percent of the total population is economically active. Just over 50% of these are dedicated to agriculture, livestock, forestry, fishing and hunting. Of a total of 60,970 hectares in the municipality, 32,901 are forest, 23,176 are used for livestock and 4,893 are cultivated. The only irrigated land is located in Misión de Bucareli with 71 hectares and Medias Coloradas with 32 hectares. Most crops are for auto consumption and include corn, beans, chickpeas, chili peppers, potatoes and tomatoes. The area has climates suited for the cultivation of apples, but pears, peaches, quince and figs are also grown. In the small subtropical area there is the production of limes, lemons, papaya, mangos, guavas, peaches, coffee, avocados, sugar cane, blackberries, pineapples and ornamental plants. Livestock is mostly cattle with some sheep, goats and pigs. Local livestock farmers have a cooperative to help with the acquisition of supplies.

In the early 2000s, apple growers in the region found that they could not sell their fruit, not because of taste but because it is smaller and has a less shiny appearance than fruit from the north of Mexico, the US and Chile. In 2003, apple growers from Pinal de Amoles and other nearby municipalities came together to find ways of marketing their product. The result is the production of apple juice, produced by a cooperative. Initial taste tests were positive but marketing was a challenge. Business students helped out and eventually the product began to appear on store shelves in various parts of Mexico and even in the US. In 2005, the cooperative signed a deal with bottlers to sell 60 tons of Querétaro Golden apples as 550,000 250-ml boxes of juice.

Just under seventeen percent of the population is dedicated to mining, infrastructure and construction. Only three percent are dedicated to manufacturing, mostly handcrafts. Handcrafts in the area include objects made from leather, palm fronds, silver, gold, wire, wool, wood and stone. Municipal president has announced plans to reactivate mining in the municipality to create jobs. He stated that it needs to be done because it is a part of the area's history. There are mines in San Gaspar, Río Escanela and Bucareli among others which generate three hundred jobs, extracting mercury, silver and antimony.

About twenty one percent are dedicated to services, tourism and general commerce. For the Sierra Gorda area, tourism, especially ecotourism is a new and important source of income for the region. As the municipality contains many of the highest peaks of the Sierra Gorda, much of the area is covered by fog and clouds for at least part of the day. Natural areas for visitors include El Camposanto Viejo and El Cruz de Palo with camping, hiking and rustic playgrounds for children. Campamento Río Escanela Enclavado is located along the Escanela River with a path that leads to the Angostura Canyon and the Puente de Dios. The nearby town of Río Escanela is an old mining community surrounded by forest. The facility has cabins, camping area, showers, picnic tables, grills and food services. Campamento Las Trancas in Potrerillos is a camping location just outside the municipal seat. In November 2010, it installed the first extreme sporting facility in the Sierra Gorda, a zip-line which measures about one hundred meters and crosses a deep narrow canyon. One ecotourism site is in Cuatro Palos, a village of thirty homes just outside the municipal seat. It is a campground which is one of twelve founded by the Sierra Gorda Ecological Group, a civil society organization dedicated to promoting alternative economies based on ecologically sensitive technologies. About thirty women from the village work at the campground as a cooperative. The campground has dry toilets in which lime, sawdust and solar energy are used to produce compost. There have also been some solar panels installed.

There are also a number of small archeological sites and historic monuments. Pinal de Amoles has had problems with the sacking of these sites, but now programs have been started to halt this activity and create tourist routes based on the sites.

Pinal de Amoles has been ranked as one of the poorest in the country of Mexico, with the lowest levels of income by the United Nations Development Programme. and one of the highest levels of economic marginalization. Only about 18% of the residents are economically active, 45% of which are homemakers, with the rest students and retirees. About half of the population is considered to be very poor, with ten percent considered to be living in deplorable conditions with no public services at all.

For this reason, many from this municipality and others from the Sierra Gorda, have migrated out to cities in Mexico and to the United States in order to work. The municipality estimates that about 35% of its population has migrated abroad, equaling about 8 thousand people. Others suggest the numbers are even higher, with an estimate of four people in the United States for each family here. No one knows exactly how many from the state of Querétaro have gone to the U.S. to work or the amount which is sent back in remittances each year. However, it is estimated that the Sierra Gorda region receives between 50,000 and US$100,000 per day or 18.2 million dollars each year. This is larger than the municipal budget of Pinal de Amoles. These remittances have come to overshadow earnings made locally from small shops, livestock and agriculture. In Pinal de Amoles and other areas of the Sierra Gorda, the dollar has become part of the economy, especially around Christmas when many come back to visit families for the holiday season. This has led to many businesses accepting the dollar as a medium of exchange in many businesses including restaurants and bars. Many families now use it as a regional currency. However, remittance money sent back can vary depending on economic and political factors. As of January 2011, the amount sent back to the Sierra Gorda fell about forty percent. Officials blame the security situation on the US-Mexican border, with many younger people in the US not visiting during the Christmas season.

The money sent back by those in the United States is so important that Pinal de Amoles is one of the sponsors of the annual “Día del Paisano” (Day of the Countryman) event which honors migrant workers visiting at Christmas time. The event is held in Jalpan de Serra and includes contests, raffles and more. This money is not only sent back directly to families but is also the basis for a number of public works projects. In the early 2000s, migrants from Querétaro formed a Federación de Clubes de Migrantes de la Sierra Gorda, in order to donate to public works projects in their hometowns. It consists of twenty seven smaller groups, eight of which are from Pina de Amoles, to spur economic development. Under a program "Queretaro Unidos Tres por Uno" each dollar sent by residents abroad is matched by the federal and state governments to three dollars as part of a nationwide program sponsored by the Secretaria de Desarrollo Sustentable. Most of the projects have been related to paving, running water and sewerage, but have also included electrical networks, schools, health centers and computer equipment. The death of sixteen residents in 2006 and 2007 and the lack of employment pushed the municipality in 2007 to start promoting legal emigration to the United States. For this purpose, municipal resources have been budgeted, and a liaison with the U.S. embassy established to help residents get visas. In 2007, forty residents succeeded in getting legal work visas through the program, who mostly went to Escondido, California. Each of these applications cost the municipality 5,000 pesos, which includes transportation north.

== Transportation and communications ==
The municipality has 399.4 km of roadway, which includes 56 km of federal highway. However, about 40% is dirt road linking about 70% of the communities. There is bus service that passes through the municipality on its way to Jalpan from both the city of Querétaro and Mexico City. Regional newspapers include : Voz de la Sierra, Mensajero de la Sierra, La Versión, El Observador and Sierra Gorda. State papers include La Sombra de Arteaga, Noticias and Diario de Querétaro.

== Archeology ==
Fossils of ammonites, trilobites, snails and oysters have been found which date back to between 250 and 125 million years.

El Quirambal is located between the municipal seat and Escanela. It is an archeological zone similar to the larger sites of Las Ranas and Toluquilla further south in the Sierra Gorda. It was inhabited by the Serrana Culture between 200 and 1200 CE with mining as its main economic activity. Among its main structures there is the Mesoamerican ball court which measures forty by twenty meters, which is flanked by a temple with a pyramid base seven meters high and fourteen meters on each side. There are various other pyramid and residential structures along with large terraces which were dug into the hillside to create more flat space. The construction from 800 to 1200 CE was similar to other areas of the La Huasteca.
