= Peñamiller =

Peñamiller, Querétaro
- Town
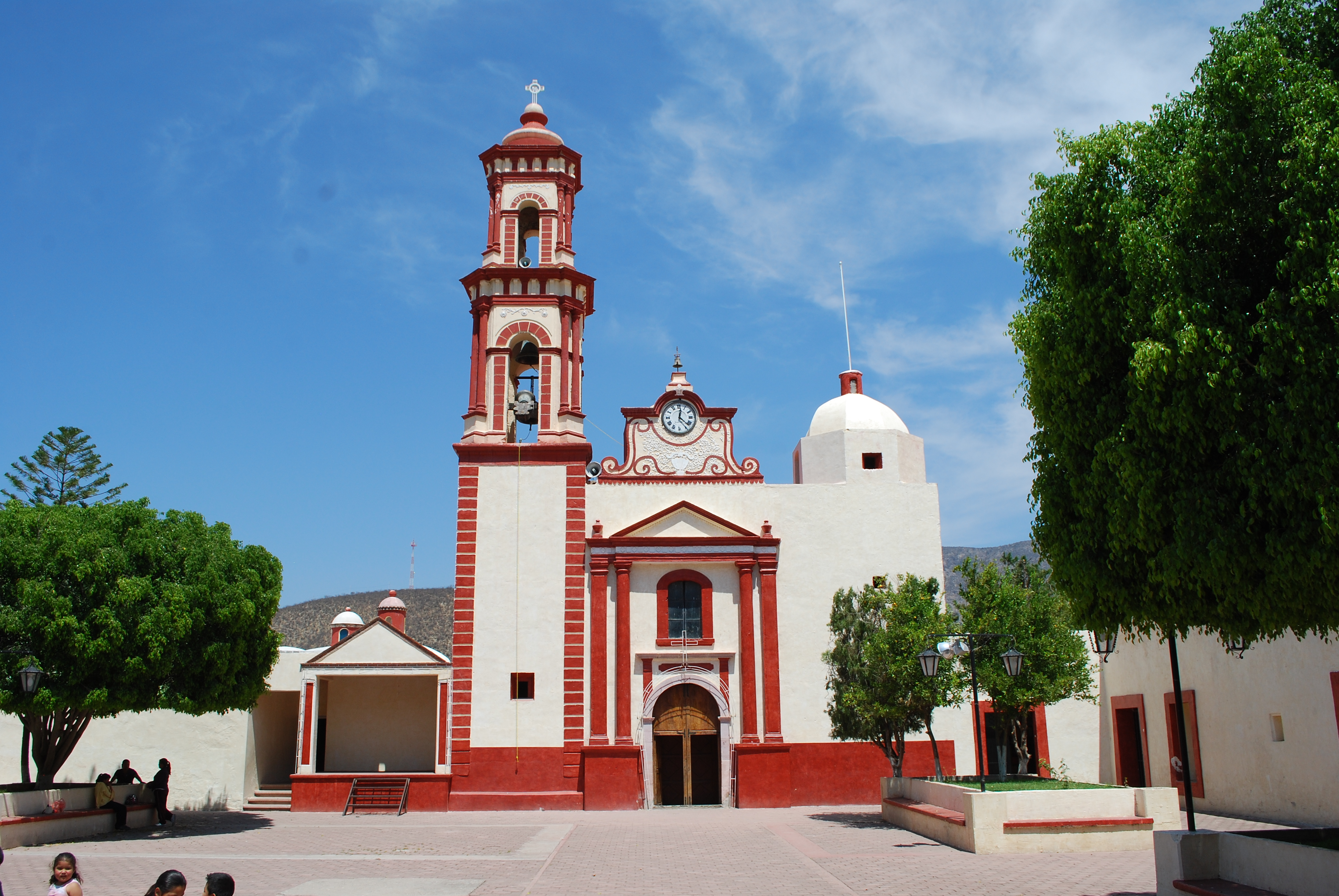
- Parish church of the municipal seat

- Location in Mexico Peñamiller, Querétaro (Mexico)
- Coordinates: 21°03′07″N 99°48′54″W
- Country: Mexico
- State: Querétaro
- Founded: 1748
- Municipal Status: 1941

Government

Area
  - Total: 694.902 km^{2} (268.303 sq mi)
- Elevation (of seat): 1,320 m (4,330 ft)

Population (2005) Municipality
  - Total: 17,007
  - Seat: 1,095
- Time zone: UTC-6 (Central (US Central))
- Postal code (of seat): 76450
- Area code: 441
- Website: www.penamiller.gob.mx (in Spanish)

Peñamiller is a town in Peñamiller Municipality in the Mexican state of Querétaro. It is part of the Sierra Gorda region with about eighty percent of the territory belonging to the Sierra Gorda Biosphere of Querétaro. The municipality is on the southwest side of the Sierra Gorda, the highest mountains of which block most of the moisture coming in from the Gulf of Mexico. For this reason, most of the territory is arid, part of what is called the Querétaro “semi-desert” filled with cactus. There is a small portion on the far east side which has temperate forests and bodies of water, mostly related to the Extoraz River, in which fish are raised. The name of the town and municipality comes from a mountain called “El Picacho” but reminded town founder José de Escandón of the Peña Mellera in Spain. Over time, the name morphed into Peñamiller.

== The town ==
The town of Peñamiller is a small community of less than 1,100 as of 2005, located in the west of the municipality at an altitude of 1330 meters. The town is wedged between mountains and the banks of the Extoraz River. It was founded and named by José de Escandón in the middle of the 18th century. He named it Peña Mellera as the mountain now known as Picacho just east of the town reminded him of a similar formation in the Peñamellera Bajo in Spain. Inside and just outside the town there are many walnut trees. Just further out there are many tall cactus and buzzards can frequently be seen circling in the air riding on warm air currents. Many of the town's roads are still dirt. The main church building dates from the 19th century and the municipal palace building is one of the oldest in the town. The municipal seat has one public library called the Biblioteca Pública Municipal Lic. Benito Juárez. It offers lending of books with home delivery, research help, guided tours, story hours for children and digital services.

The most important local religious event occurs on 15 August, when the Our Lady of the Assumption is venerated. This event lasts eight days and includes pilgrimages, masses, dances, novenas and fireworks. The next most important are the events associated with the Christmas season. The annual Passion Play has been held since 1880 with the participation of at least fifty actors each year. It is held on the streets of the town, especially where there are shady walnut trees ending at the Cerro del Calvario were the crucifixion in enacted. The Feria de la Nuez, dedicated to the Archangel Michael, is held on the 29th of September. This event include sporting events, traditionals as jaripeos, a coronation of a queen and popular dance.

Handcrafts produced in the town include a tool called a guingaro, used to accomplish much of the work in the fields. They also made embroidered belts (called pitiados) as well as reed baskets and brooms and a type of overcoat.

== Geography ==
The municipality is located in the north of the state, in the Querétaro semi desert area. It is considered to be the gateway to the Sierra Gorda in Querétaro. Eighty percent of the municipality belongs to the Sierra Gorda Biosphere Reserve of Querétaro. The territory is very rugged with altitudes varying from between 1,280 and 3000 masl. The most important elevations include El Cerro del Piñon at 3000 masl, Mesa de Salinas at 2460masl, El Campanario at 2120 masl, La Tembladera at 2080 masl, El Piloncito at 1980 masl, El Cerro de Dios at 1900 masl and El Picacho at 1680masl. The municipality in the Extoráz River basin, which receives rainfall over a surface of 2,149 km2 and results in a river that moves 1,150,000m3 of water each year. This river is the main one in the municipality, and has carved out a large canyon called the Cañon del Paraíso (Paradise Canyon), located three km west of the town of Peñamiller. This canyon is barely ten meters wide, but it is 700 meters long with sides of black marble up to one hundred feet high. There are some caves and other capricious forms on the canyon walls, as well as petroglyphs and cave paintings done by ancient Chichimecas. The area has hiking trails with signs, mountain climbing, rappelling and camping. The cave paintings of Del Sol and De la Luna are also located along the Extoraz River, ten km off of Highway 120, next to the community of El Mirador. The sun image measures approximately one meter in diameter and the moon image about sixty cm. These paintings are found on the south side of a large hill which is situation over an even large one and has a natural opening similar to a window. During part of the year, the sun's rays pass directly through the “window” onto the sun image.

=== Hydrography ===
The only other surface water is the Saucello, Los Encinos, Higuerillas and Del Buey arroyos, which generally do not flow during the dry season from March to June.

=== Climate ===
The climate is dry and semi-hot with an average annual temperature of 22C. Winters are distinguishable and freezes occur on occasion. The hottest months are from May to August when temperatures can rise to up to 40C. The average temperature year round is 21.7C. Annual precipitation, mostly restricted to the rainy season in late summer and early fall is about 435mm. The lowest areas, between 1200 and 1400masl has the driest climate with an average rainfall of about 300 to 400 mm yearly. Temperatures range from 2 to 35C with an average temperature of 22C. Winters are well defined and freezes appear about once every ten years. Between 1500 and 1800 masl, the conditions begin to change from semi desert to temperate forest. Temperatures vary from -3 to 35C with an average of 20C. Between 2000 and 3000masl, temperatures vary from -5 to 25C and rainfall of between 500 and 600mm. The municipality experiences about sixty cloudy days each year.

=== Flora and fauna ===
Most of the vegetation consists of mesquite (prosopis spp) along with some pine-holm oak forest in the east and desert scrub brush on the extreme south. Other plants that can be found in the municipality include palo bobo (Tessaria integrifolia), uña de gato, huisache (Vachellia farnesiana), granjeno, palo sishote as well as nopal, wild oregano and barrel cactus. Wildlife is mostly limited to that which can live in arid conditions such as doves, turtledoves, quail, rabbits, squirrels, skunks, weasels, cacomistle, raccoons, badgers, coyotes, foxes, armadillos and various types of snakes including the coral snake and the rattlesnake. In the La Higuera and Río Blanco rivers there are various types of fish such as trout, tilapia, catfish and carp. In the forested areas, there are white-tailed deer, temazate (Mazama temama), wild boar, and pumas.

The Tembladera Lookout Point is situated on the side of Highway 120. The site allows for views of “biznaga” cactus which grow to up to 2.3 meters in height as well as views of mountains such as the Cerro de Media Luna, Cerro de la Virgen, El Picacho, Cerro el Capanario as well as the Del Paraiso Canyon, and the Extoráz River.

== Demographics and culture ==
The military campaigns of the mid 18th century wiped out most of the Chichimecas except for some small communities. Otomi families were brought into the area into settlements such as El Paraíso, Adjuntas de Higueras, La Higuera, El Puerto de la Guitarra, Agua del Ángel, El Pilón La Tinaja, El Carrizal and La Mesa del Troje. However, at their peak they only numbered about 550 inhabitants. Since that time, most of these small groups assimilated into the mainstream culture, losing the Otomi language and many emigrated out of the area, especially in the 20th century. As of the 2005 census, only fifty people who spoke an indigenous language at all lived in the municipality. About 6% of the municipality's population was Otomi in 1900, but near zero now.

The population in 2000 was 16,557 distributed in 136 small communities, with about 95 percent considered to be rural. There were 17,007 in 2005. Ninety eight percent of the municipality is Catholic divided into four parishes, Santa Maria Peñamiller, San Miguel Palmas, San José Pinal de Amoles and Atargea in Guanajuato. In the past, families were large with up to twelve children but in the 20th century, family planning campaigns have brought that average down to 5.6. Peñamiller has one of the highest rates of single mothers in the state. The municipality has the highest rate of maternal mortality with an average of 20.6 deaths per 10,000 live births. The state average is 4.1.

Because of the lack of employment, there is mass emigration from the area. Most rural people migrate to larger cities in Mexico or to the United States and many never return. During the last decades of the 20th and the first years of the 21st, the municipality has had about 3,500 people leave to find work and about 130 on average never return.

Popular traditional musical styles include corrido and huapango, with a number of locally notable bands. Huapango is most often placed for traditional festivities.

The cuisine of the area is traditional Mexican cuisine adapted to the food products of the Querétaro semi-desert area. A number of cactus and succulent species are eaten including Agave americana, the flowers of the yucca plant, garambullo (Myrtillocactus geometrizans), nopal and sotol (Dasylirion texanum). Insects such as escamoles, tantarrias (an insect which lives in mesquite trees) and maguey worms (larvae) are also eaten. Escamoles and maguey worms are often eaten mixed together. Goat meat is popular as it is relatively easy to raise in the harsh climate. The most representative dish of the area is “chivo tapiado”, which is goat meat accompany by wild vegetables in season, especially various types of cactus. In the river areas, a number of fish species and caught and grown including trout, tilapia, catfish and carp.

== History ==
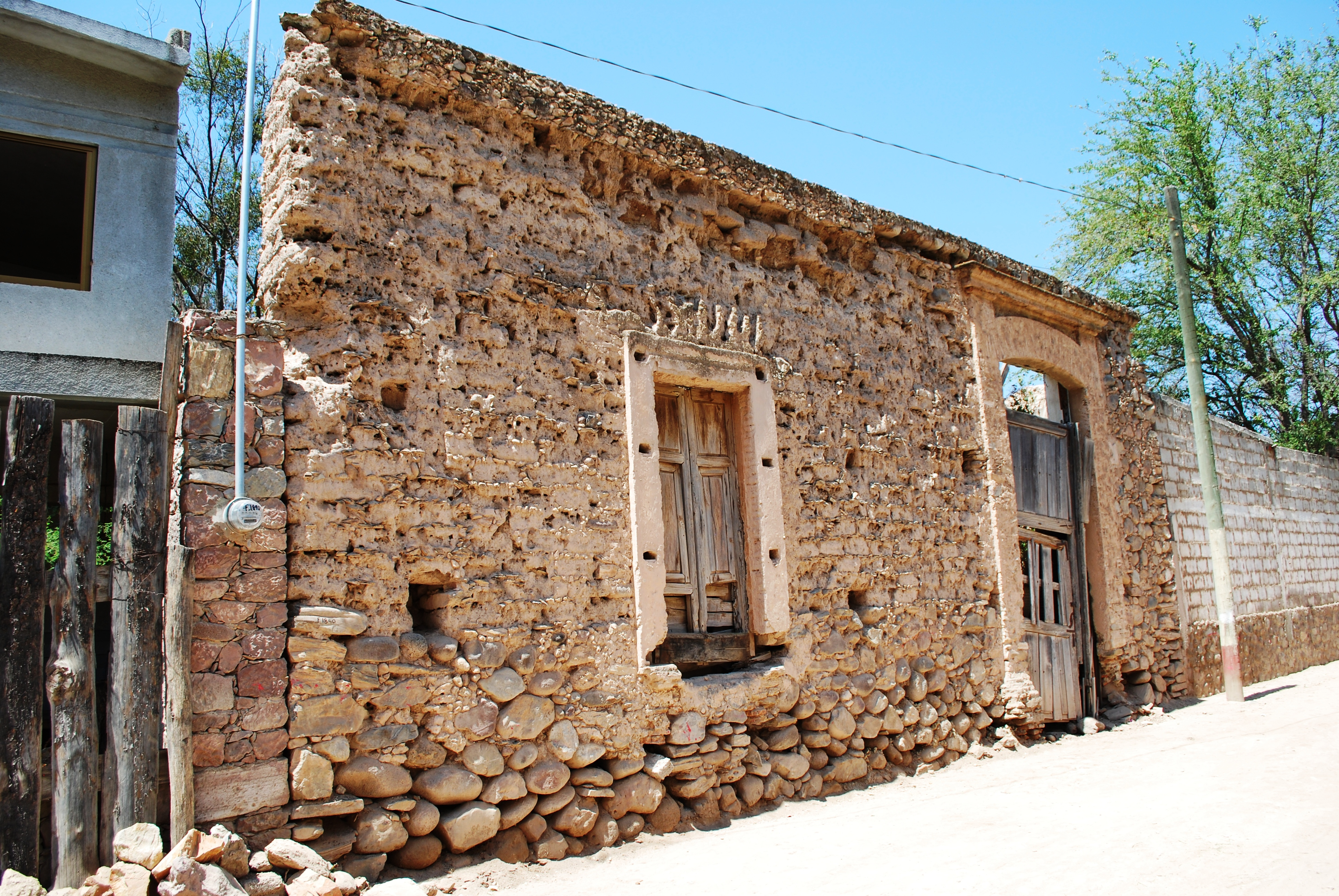
Adobe facade

The name was originally Peñamellera, given by José de Escandón, as the mountain formation east of town reminded him of a similar formation in Asturias, Spain in the Peñamellera Baja. It was officially named Santa María de Peñamillera when the area became a sub prefecture of Tolimán. Eventually, the name morphed to what it is today. The municipality's coat of arms represents the history and traditions of the area, especially those related to the founding of the Spanish town in 1748 and after. Since it was the 18th century, the sun figure has eighteen rays. Another motif is that of a colonizer subjugating an indigenous person to represent the conquest of the Chichimecas. As thirty seven families moved in to found the town, there are thirty seven marked tombs, and a tree represents the distribution of lands. Eight palms in a walnut tree branch represent the most important annual celebration, that of the Virgin of the Assumption on August 15. The parish church is represented, and the mass of foundation is represented by a cross at the top of the coat of arms.

The area which is now Peñamiller has been inhabited for more than 2000 years, which is shown in part by the petroglyphs where have been found along the Extoraz River. More artwork painted or chiseled in rock formations are found in de Río Blanco, El Soyatal, El Mirador, El Puerto del Cobre, La Mesa de los Chilitos, La Cueva del Caballo, and La Cruz del Milagro. In the pre Classic period, the area was dominated by the Serrana Culture, the same culture that built the sites of Las Ranas and Toluquillo. From this culture there are remains such as ceramic figures found in La Plazuela, Camargo and Alto Bonito, which date from the 7th century. These objects show Toltec influence. There also have been pre Hispanic tools likely related to mining found in the area, especially around Soyatal. Mining mostly focused on the extraction of mercury and cinnabar, with the latter extensively commercialized from 800 to 900 CE. The Pames arrived in the 13th century and mostly settled in the area around San Miguel Palmas. The Chichimeca Jonaz arrived in the 14th century and mainly settled in Tembladera, El Portugués and the areas around the Extoraz River and the Cerro de Media Luna, in the east where the land is less arid.

The first Spanish in the region were led by Nicolás de San Luis Montañez in the mid 16th century. Because of their battles with the Chichimecas, San Luis Montañez was named “Capitan of the Chichimecas.” The Pames did not offer much resistance to Spanish incursion but the Chichimeca Jonaz did. In Pame lands, the San Miguel Palmas mission was founded relatively early, in 1691, when the indigenous peoples there requested that a priest be sent to them for evangelization purposes. It was abandoned briefly for unknown reasons in 1684. The mission church was completed in 1723. Río Blanco was founded as a mining camp in 1691 when deposits of mercury, silver, gold and water for processing were found by the Spanish. However, Peñamiller and the rest of the Sierra Gorda of Querétaro were not subdued and settled until the expedition of José de Escandón in the mid 18th century, culminating in the defeat of the Chichimeca Jonaz and allies at the Battle of Media Luna (in neighboring Pinal de Amoles) in 1748.

The municipal seat was founded in 1748, at first with a military aim of a fortress against the scattered Chichimecas who had escaped the Battle of Media Luna. Soldiers and families were located strategically; both against the remaining Chichimecas and to make sure the indigenous among them did not rebel. This totaled thirty soldiers with their families along with one hundred others under the command of Captain Joseph Antonio Diaz Maldonado. A presidio was established as a sub prefecture of the district of Tolimán. The official foundation ceremony included a mass officiated by Friar Tomas Aquino Ramirez de Prado, and declared as the Villa de Peña Millera de la Santisima Virgen de la Asunción. The new settlement was traced out with a plaza, a church, monastery cemetery and gardens on the north side with lands partitioned out on the other sides. In addition, four official pasturelands for cattle were marked off in each of the cardinal directions. In 1825, the presidio became a Franciscan mission under the direction of San Pedro and San Pablo of Michoacán. By this time, the town has grown sufficiently that there were a number of large mansion homes, the most prominent belonging to Juan Sánchez, Luis Olvera, Lamberto Rodríguez, Aurora Requena and Alicia Sánchez.

With the declaration of the first state constitution, Peñamiller belonged to the district of Tolimán, under the name of Santa María Peña Millera. Sometime from then to the present the named changed permanently to the current form, with “Peñamiller” first showing up in records as early as 1833.

The last battle of the Rebellion of the Sierra Gorda was fought here in 1849. Eleuterio Quiroz, a principal leader of the movement, was captured by General Tomas Mejía and made a prisoner, then executed by firing squad. The body was embalmed, taken to Pinar de San Agustín and hung by the government as an example.

During the government of Porfirio Díaz, a number of men amassed large estates and fortunes. In Peñamiller, the largest landholder was Rafael Olvera, who was cacique of all the Sierra Gorda and the richest man in Querétaro at that time. He was also governor from 1883 to 1887. His two main properties in Peñamiller were the Boquillas and Extoraz Haciendas, the latter the largest in the state at 41,036 hectares.

During the Mexican Revolution in 1916, Peñamiller was separated from the district of Tolimán and joined to the municipality of Colón. Peñamiller was recognized as a town in 1917, under its modern name in 1917. In the same year, it was made part of the Colón municipality then back to Tolimán. The area was affected by a severe flu epidemic in 1918. From 1918 to 1920, the parish church of Santa María de la Asunción was remodeled and redecorated. In 1924, its status as a community in the municipality of Tolimán was reaffirmed.

Much of the land from the haciendas were broken up from 1915 to 1930 and made into communally held lands called ejidos. While the initial declarations were made in 1915, their implementation was delayed until 1930. These ejidos include Extortas, Rio Blanco, Las Enramadas, Peña Blanco, San Lorenzo, La Plazuela, Maguey Verde, El Pilón, Los Encinos, Agua Fria, Molinitos de Orozco, El Portugues, Camargo, La Higuera, El Tequizquite and San Isidro Boquillas. In 1936, much of the Peñamiller area was reformed as the Villa Zapata delegation of the municipality of Tolimán. In 1936, a rebel group led by Taurino López burned the municipal archives of Peñamiller. However, this rebel leader was found the next day hanged. The main church of the town of Peñamiller became a parish in 1937, and then it was named as head of its own municipality in 1941.

The tower of the parish church was built in 1955. Highway 120 was built through the municipality in the 1960s, but it was not paved until 1980. Basic modern infrastructure such as running water, electricity and a health center were constructed in 1962, but only in the municipal seat. A dirt road connecting the municipal seat with Tolimán was built in 1972. From 1960 to 1970, mining was at its height in the municipality with 128 mines extracting mostly mercury. However, mercury prices crashed in the 1970s and the boom ended.

The municipal palace, an auditorium, a sports facility and a medical clinic were built in the mid-1980s. The parish church was remodeled again in the 1990s, with support from state and municipal authorities. At the same time, a “teatro del pueblo” or people's theatre was constructed for social and religious events as well as sports.

In 1994, the Colegio de Estudios Científicos y Tecnológicos del Estado de Querétaro, Peñamiller Campus was established, starting with 58 students. Distance high school education was begun in the rural delegation of Camargo. A similar program was installed in the San Miguel Palmas delegation in 2002.

In 1998, Marcio Antonio Morales Sanchez was named the first “child municipal president” for Children's day on 30 April, a tradition which has been repeated since. During the first decade of the 21st century, there were a number of remodeling projects on the facades of the historic center of the municipal seat, including the Santa María de la Asunción Church.

During the latter 2000s, Peñamiller and the rest of the Sierra Gorda experienced a number of small earthquakes, in an area which is not prone to seismic activity. A large number of these small quakes were felt from the latter part of 2010 to the first months of 2011. A number of communities including Villa Emiliano Zapata, San Juanico, El Alamo and Peñamiller have reported smelling sulfur and other foul odors and seeing vapor in connection with the quakes. As of January 2011, over fifty small quakes have been reported in Peñamiller alone, but the cause of the quakes is not known. However, none of the recorded events have been over 3 on the Richter scale so far. The Instituto de Geociencias of UNAM and the state of Querétaro have been investigating the seismic activity. Seismic activity monitors has been placed in various areas of the municipality by UNAM, and the state installed ten others at a cost of US$170 million.

As Peñamiller has a mining past, there have been problems with pollution associated with the mines, many of which are abandoned. In 2007, residents of the municipality protested to authorities about the quality of water coming from two wells on which depend about 3,000 people. The water has tested positive for lead and magnesium for at least twenty years and the problem is worse during the rainy season. On occasion the contamination during this season is such that the water comes out brown due to sediment. The mineral contamination is due to abandoned mercury mines in the area. Then municipal president Juan Manuel García Leal admitted that at least 5,000 people in eight communities drink and otherwise use water contaminated with magnesium and other minerals. Another source of contamination are the pipes used to transport the water, however the municipality does not have the resources to replace the system.

Peñamiller is one of the municipalities in the Sierra Gorda with high rates of migration to the United States, due to economic marginalization. This has led to a significant loss of students in the public schools, who generally accompany their parents when they move out.

== Economy ==
About 21% of the total population is economically active. About thirty four percent of the working population is dedicated to agriculture, livestock, forestry, fishing and hunting. 1,045 hectares of land are dedicated to irrigated farming, with 916 farmed only during the rainy season. The rest, about 70,000 is left wild due to its dryness. Irrigated land is limited to those closest to the Extoráz River and orchards that produce avocados, guavas, cherimoya, peaches, pomegranates, figs, limes, lemons, mangos, oranges, nuts, papayas and more. The most profitable crop is nuts, including pecans and pine nuts, although the amount produced each year can vary. However, there is a total of fifty three products grown with significant harvest. Pine nuts, avocado and Mexican plums are grown at the Maguey Verde, La Higuera, Camargo, Los Encinos, Río Blanco, Agua Fría and Molinitos ejidos.

There is relatively little livestock raised due to the harshness of the land, but most of the livestock is pigs followed by goats. There are 54,895 hectares used as natural pasture with 79 hectares are seeded.

There are about 20,000 hectares of forest which can be cut and include species such as pine, oyamel, juniper, white cedar and red cedar, oak, poplar, strawberry trees, mesquite and more. In areas without logging, there are a number of species of plants with medicinal properties, including wild oregano, cat's claws and more, which produce a harvest of about 500 tons per year. Wild foodstuffs include maguey, nopal cactus, pitayo fruit, yuccas and more, which usually give a more abundant harvest once every four years. Wild herbs area generally harvested between August and November. Another product is the production of willow branches, which is supplied as raw material to communities such as Tequisquiapan for crafts.

Mining, construction, and industry employ about twenty three percent of the population. Industry is mostly limited to the production of clothes in small workshops in Camargo, Los Encinos, San Lorenzo, Las Enramadas, La Vega, Peñamiller and La Misión de Palmas, employing just over two hundred people. There is also a workshop in La Misión de Palmas that makes sandals with tire tread soles that employs twenty five people. Soccer balls stitched by hand are made by about 350 people working at home in about twenty communities, mostly by women and school-aged children to allow them to earn money without leaving home to supplement family income. Local handcrafts include belts decorated with a type of embroidery. Various articles are made with willow branches such as baskets and hats, mostly made in San Lorenzo and Villa Emiliano Zapata and sold in Tequisquiapan. Rope is made in Las Mesas, El Cobre, Agua de Pedro, Puerto de Ojo de Agua and Aposentos, with items such as baskets and brooms made from reeds in the municipal seat. There are various mineral deposits in the municipality with mercury having been the most extracted. There were 128 mines during the 1960s and early 1970s, but the demand for mercury steeply declined after the Vietnam War. There are still small deposits of gold, silver, copper, zinc antimony and bauxite. There are stone quarries which produce marble, onyx, and sandstone in various colors.

About sixteen percent of the population is dedicated to commerce and services. Commerce is mostly limited to basic needs for the local population, including tianguis held in seven communities during the week. There is no municipal market. There are also eight businesses dedicated to buying forest products.

The Sierra Gorda region has been promoted for tourism, especially ecotourism in recent decades. Peñamiller is promoted as the gateway to this region. There are some guest houses and other facilities for tourism. The Mesa del Sombrerete Ecotourism Center is located seven km from the Río Blanco River which is mostly dedicated to camping. It has cabins, restaurant, and hiking. El Oasis is a water park which obtains its water from a fresh water spring, which are propelled 200 meters into the main pool by the force of gravity. It is located in the Higueras Arroyo, surrounded by tall mountains. The tallest is the Cerro de la Virgen, which has a rock crag as a lookout point. The park offers camping and the park's pools and other attractions are filled with water from clear waters from a spring 200 meters away. These waters are also bottled and sold with the brand name “Peña Miller.” The facility also has a restaurant, multi use sports field, tanks for fish and cabins. The Río Blanco River area marks the boundary between the forested and semi desert areas of the municipality. It is home to Ecoalbergue Río Blanco, which is an ecotourism facility. Activities include camping, cave exploring, canyon exploring, visiting fresh water springs and abandoned mines and hiking.

== Transportation ==
The town of Peñamiller is connected by highway to the state capital, San Juan del Río and Xilitla. The municipality has 61 km of paved highway, 276 km of dirt roads and 52 km of dirt paths. All communities except for La Tinaja are connected by one of these three types of roads. There is public bus service between the municipal seat and Querétaro, Mexico City, Guadalajara, El Guamúchil, Atarjea, San Miguel Palmas Molinitos, Villa Emiliano Zapata, Peña Blanca, La Higuera, El Saucito and Las Mesas. For transportation to other communities in the municipality, there are about twenty pickup trucks which function as communal taxis.
