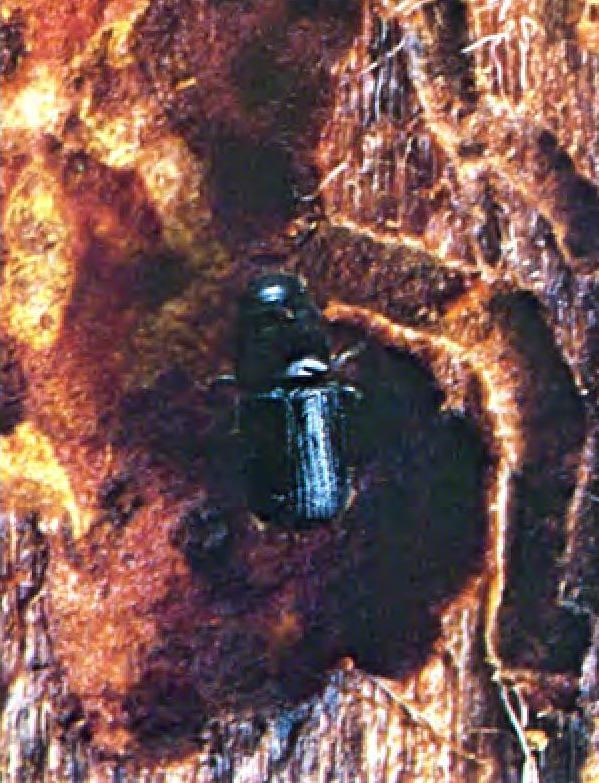
- Adult Roundheaded Pine Beetle

Scientific classification
- Kingdom: Animalia
- Phylum: Arthropoda
- Clade: Pancrustacea
- Class: Insecta
- Order: Coleoptera
- Suborder: Polyphaga
- Infraorder: Cucujiformia
- Superfamily: Curculionoidea
- Family: Curculionidae
- Subfamily: Scolytinae
- Genus: Dendroctonus
- Species: D. adjunctus

Binomial name
- Dendroctonus adjunctus Blandford, 1897

= Dendroctonus adjunctus =

Species of beetle

Dendroctonus adjunctus, the roundheaded pine beetle, is a species of bark beetle in the family Curculionidae found in North America. A parasite, the roundheaded pine beetle feeds on and eventually kills pine trees of several species in Guatemala, Mexico, and the Southern United States (New Mexico, Arizona, Nevada, Colorado, Utah).

Roundheaded pine beetles are a serious threat to wild and commercial pine stocks, wiping out up to half of pine trees in a region in outbreak years. To prevent and mitigate the beetle's epidemic outbreaks, loggers have developed a variety of biological, cultural, and chemical controls.

== Description ==
Like many insect species, the roundheaded pine beetle goes through several stages in its life cycle, changing dramatically in appearance between each one. Adults are 5-6 mm long and 3 mm wide, with females slightly larger than males. Adult exoskeletons are shiny, reflective, dark brown or black, and covered with hairs. Their eyes are flat, don't protrude from the exoskeleton, and are generally elongated. The adult beetles have antennae and wings and can fly.

The roundheaded pine beetle's eggs, less than 1.5 mm in length and width, are much smaller than adults. They are oblong and pearly white.

Larvae are C-shaped, legless, and mostly translucent, though their abdomens are sometimes visible as tinges of reddish-brown. Depending on the instar stage, the larvae's size can vary from slightly larger than an egg to slightly smaller than an adult.

When the larvae become pupae, they become opaque white. The pupae also have antennae, legs, and wing covers, reflecting characteristics of the species' adult form.

== Life cycle ==
The lifespan of most roundheaded pine beetle is one year. In October and November, female adults gain flying abilities and colonize weakened pine trees by attacking the tree bole's basal portion. The beetles often capitalize on trees already attacked by species in the Ips and Dendroctonus genera. Once they locate a desirable pine tree, they release aggregation pheromones, which attract other beetles to the tree. The beetles then bore through the pine's bark, constructing chambers where mating occurs. After mating, each male-female beetle pair works together to build egg galleries, carving grid-like structures of tunnels where females lay and store their eggs. Though egg galleries of different mating pairs often cross, it appears roundheaded pine beetles do not actively cooperate in infesting trees beyond male-female mating partnerships.

The roundheaded pine beetle's egg galleries can grow to be pretty extensive, as each horizontal tunnel is on average separated by 2.5-5 cm and each longitudinal tunnel by 30 cm. Each gallery overall is usually 30.5 cm long, but large galleries can extend to 1.2 meters. Female roundheaded pine beetles fill their galleries with egg, depositing one egg per grid niche on alternating sides of the gallery. The beetles initially keep the egg gallery free of dust, but as the gallery deepens into the tree, male beetles packs the first few inches of tunnels closest to the pine bark with boring dust, probably to protect the eggs.

Beneath the bark, these egg galleries mostly exist in the tree's cambium, the layer separating the pine's xylem, transport tissue carrying water from tree roots to leaves, from its phloem, tissue ferrying sugar and other nutrients around the plant. However, the egg galleries extend into the tree's phloem and often its xylem as well extend beyond; the roundheaded pine beetles coopt phloem into their habitat, severing the tree's internal circulation and drastically reducing its ability to get sugars and nutrients to where they're needed. Roundheaded pine beetle pairs also feed on phloem throughout, further sapping the host tree of nutrients.

Roundheaded pine beetle pairs that begin boring into trees in October complete their galleries by December; those that start in November can only partially complete their dwellings by December. For these beetles, cold bark temperatures between December and February limits their gallery tunneling to the few days when the bark is warm enough for activity. Adult roundheaded beetles continue a minor amount of construction in March and April.

Roundheaded eggs generally hatch between mid-March and late April; the eggs of beetle pairs that colonized pines in October may hatch in the winter, but almost all quickly perish from cold. Though early-hatching eggs die, unhatched beetles are surprisingly resilient against the winter cold, surviving in temperatures as low as -25°F. Young larvae form small feeding galleries in the phloem. After their first molt, the larvae bore outwards, mining the tree's cambium; after their second molt, in the third instar phase, the young roundheaded pine beetles tunnel into the outer bark to complete their development. As they excavate, the beetles broaden a series of feeding channels leading to what will become pupal chambers, laying the groundwork for the pine beetles to more easily pupate into adult form.

The roundheaded larvae rapidly develop through the third instar phase, molting to reach the fourth instar. Fourth-instar larvae mature much more slowly, generally only pupating into adults in late July and early August. In fringe cases, however, beetles may pupate as early as June and as late as mid-September. Once adults, the roundheaded pine beetles remain in their sickening host pine of birth for 2 to 3 months, departing between late September and early November. By late November, adults will have located fresh pines to colonize, mate in, and build an egg gallery, thus restarting the cycle.

== Effects on trees and outbreaks ==
By using pine tree's phloem for food, habitat, and egg-laying, roundheaded pine beetles are extremely destructive towards pines, as they sever the tree's circulation, sap it of nutrients, and eliminate its ability to get sugar to where it's needed. The beetles can kill individual trees, clumps of dozens of pines, and even wipe out pines from entire forests. In the US, roundheaded beetles target and kill young, mature, and overmature Pinus ponderosa pines. They particularly thrive when pole-sized ponderosa pines are tightly packed together; each tree is large enough to support the beetles, while the pines' close proximity allows the beetles to easily fly from one tree to the next, infecting all.

Periodic outbreaks, while brief and infrequent, are devastating to ponderosa pine populations. In 1950, roundheaded pine beetles infested 16,000 pole-sized ponderosa pines near Cloudcroft, New Mexico. In 1971, an even more devastating epidemic occurred, as the species killed 400,000 pole-sized ponderosas in southern New Mexico. In the 1990s, the roundheaded beetles caused similar epidemics of pine tree death in the mountains of southern New Mexico and southeastern Arizona.

In dense clumps, the beetles colonize and kill pines in groups of 3 to 15; in exceptional cases, they wipe out up to 100 trees at a time. Roundheaded pine beetles can kill up to 50% of the trees in pure ponderosa pine stands; even when pines are interspersed with other conifers, roundheaded beetles still eliminate up to 50% of pines, in doing so reshaping forest ecosystems by leaving Douglas firs as the dominant species.

While attacking ponderosa pines the most, roundheaded pine beetles also colonize and kill the limber pine in the United States. In Mexico and Guatemala, the roundheaded beetle also attacks the Mexican white pine, Chihuahua pine, Montezuma pine, and Pinus pseudostrobus.

Roundheaded pine beetles also spreads the fungi Ophiostoma adjuncti and Leptographium pyrinum as it infects trees. The role these fungi play in benefitting the beetle or killing the pines remains unclear.

== Predators and parasites ==
The red-bellied cleric and a predacious beetle Temnochila virescens prey on roundheaded beetles, while braconid wasps of the Coleoides genus and the nematodes Parasitylenchus stipatus and Parasitylenchus dendroctoni parasitize roundheaded beetles. The latter two nematode species are used to target egg-laying adult females, as the parasites sap the beetles of resources, halving egg production of invested females. Woodpeckers are also closely associated with roundheaded pine beetles; given that they consume over 90% of other species in the Dendroctonus genus on individual trees, they likely also heavily predate on roundheaded beetles.

== Pest control ==
Given the deleterious effects roundheaded pine beetles have on commercial and wild pine populations, the United States Forest Service recommends combining biological, cultural, and chemical control to mitigate roundheaded populations before the beetles' infestations become epidemic. The Forest Service recommends using natural predators and parasites to control the beetles. Commercial landowners can also culturally adapt to roundheaded pine beetle infestations by thinning their forest stocks and felling and burning infested pines as soon as possible. Chemically controlling roundheaded beetles requires lots of time and resources, so it is generally limited to protect pine trees of the highest value.
