= Chichimeca Jonaz =

Chichimeca Jonaz may refer to:

- Chichimeca Jonaz people, an ethnic group of Mexico
- Chichimeca Jonaz language, a language of Mexico

== See also ==
- Chichimeca, a historic group of peoples
