= Chichimeco =

Chichimeco may refer to:

- Chichimeca Jonaz people, a contemporary ethnic group of Mexico
  - Chichimeca Jonaz language, their language
- Chichimeca, a historic group of peoples of Mexico
- Chichimeco, the Spanish name for the Westo, a historic tribe of the eastern United States
