= Landa de Matamoros =

- Town
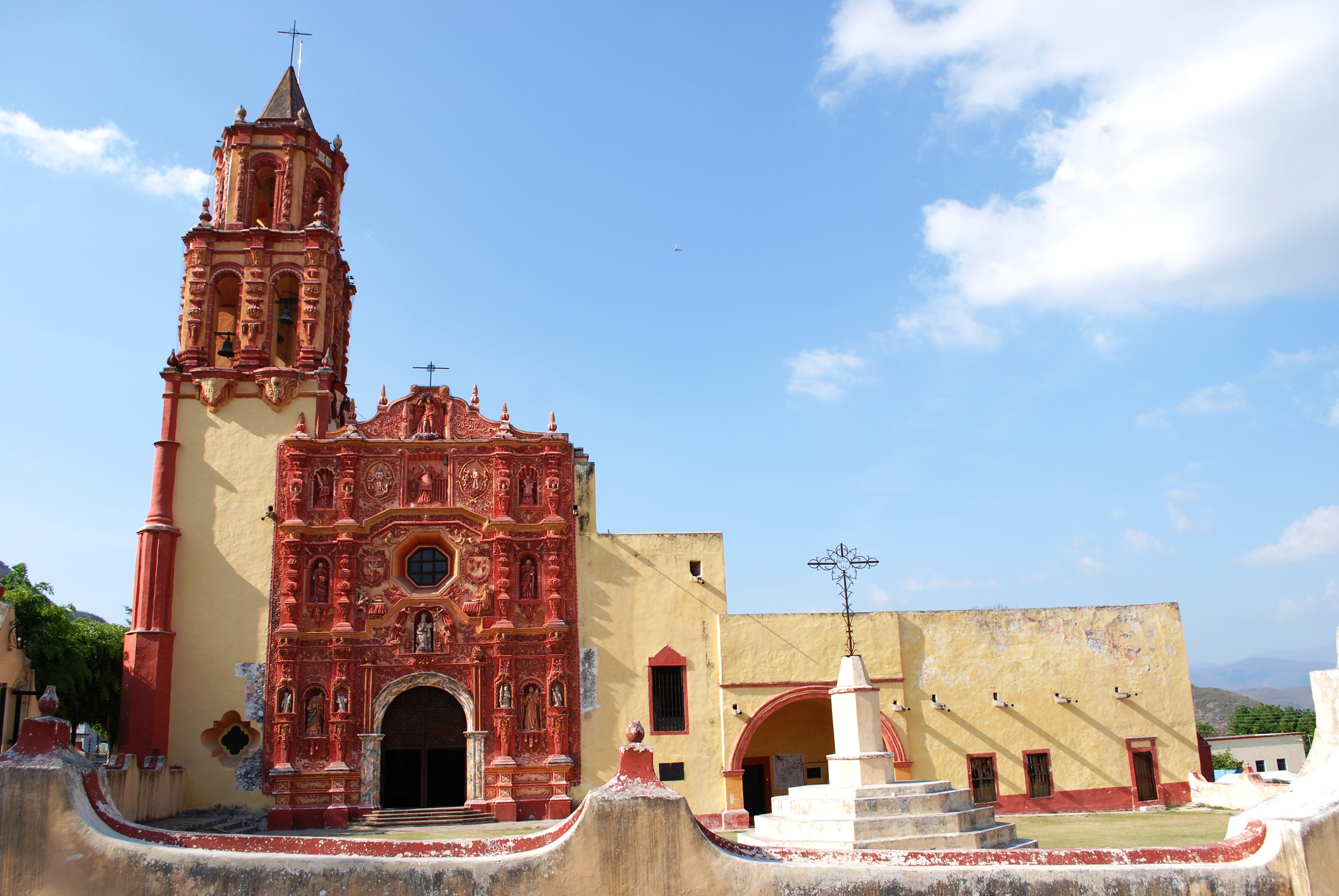
- Church in Landa

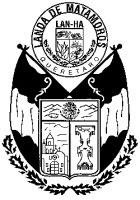
- Coat of arms

- Location in Mexico
- Coordinates: 21°10′55″N 99°19′13″W
- Country: Mexico
- State: Querétaro
- Founded: 1744
- Municipal Status: 1941

Government

Area
  - Total: 840.2 km^{2} (324.4 sq mi)
- Elevation (of seat): 1,040 m (3,410 ft)

Population (2005) Municipality
  - Total: 18,905
  - Seat: 1,418
- Time zone: UTC-6 (Central (US Central))
- Postal code (of seat): 76360
- Website: www.landadematamorosqro.gob.mx (in Spanish)

Landa de Matamoros is a town in Landa de Matamoros Municipality located in the northeast of the Mexican state of Querétaro in central Mexico. It is part of the Sierra Gorda region, which consists of rugged mountains, canyons and wide diversity of flora and fauna, with the municipality's flora representing about 25% of all the plant diversity in Mexico. In the pre-Hispanic period, the area was heavily influenced by Huastecas and local cultures, later dominated by the Chichimecas, especially the Pames. Complete Spanish domination came late, in the mid 18th century, but two of the five Franciscan mission complexes built to solidify this domination were built in the municipality. Today, Landa de Matamoros remains rural and impoverished with a high rate of emigration out of the area, especially to the United States. Remittances sent by relatives from there now form most of the municipality's economy.

== The town ==
Landa de Matamoros sits at the foot of a chain of small mountains with crags at an altitude of 1,040m just off Highway 120 about 210 km from the capital of Querértaro. The town of Landa de Matamoros is considered to have first been occupied by a group of Purépecha from Michoacán who migrated north. In the pre-Hispanic period, it had an important tianguis market, which traded merchandise from other parts of the La Huasteca and what is now Tampico. Today, Landa is a small community with cobblestone streets centered on a traditional main square in front of the mission. Landa's main economic activities include agriculture, livestock and services, including government services. It is also head of a district called Centro Estratégico Comunitario Micrregión 01, which oversees economic activities of thirteen communities with just under 2,000 people.

The town of Landa is best known for having one of the five Franciscan missions in the Sierra Gorda, which were made a World Heritage Site in 2003. This mission is dedicated to Our Lady of the Immaculate Conception. It along with the others are noted for their highly decorated Baroque facades, which contains indigenous elements. They were built under the direction of Junipero Serra in the mid 18th century, with the Landa mission built last, in the 1760s.

The Museo de Arte Agropecuario (Museum of Agricultural Art) is located in Landa has three exhibition halls. One room exhibits the fossil remains of a mastodon, which was found under the mission church during restoration work in 1984. The other two contain historical photographs, as well as implements related to farming, livestock, forestry, commerce and home. There is also an area with for temporary exhibits and a handcrafts store. The museum offers guided tours, conferences and summer courses. There is also the municipal auditorium and a cultural center called a Casa de Cultura.

The most important annual celebration is the feast of the patroness of the community, Our Lady of the Immaculate Conception. At least a thousand migrants return each year to Landa to celebrate, with many of these come from Texas especially Corpus Christi, Houston, Austin and Dallas, bringing their pickup trucks and cowboy clothes with them, but a number also come from Florida and Atlanta. The town hosts a major dance for the occasion, in part to honor the returnees. The event is held during the first half of December. The event often features musical styles popular in Texas.

== Demographics and culture ==
There are no longer any representative indigenous groups in the municipality, with only 36 speaking any kind of indigenous language as of 2005. Over 96% of the population is Catholic.

From 1950 to 2005, the municipality's population grew from 9,226 to 19,493 people, representing a growth rate of 0.8%. Birthrates are high and mortality rates are low, however, since the 2000s, the municipality has experienced significant migration out. Without this migration, the growth rate would have been about 1.5%. From 2000 to 2005, the population has decreased to 18,905. It is estimated about 32% of the working age population of the municipality has emigrated to look for employment. Most from Landa migrate to Texas, especially Houston. However, those from certain communities tend to go to certain places in the United States. For example, those who are from La Lagunita generally go to Corpus Christi, while those from La Vuelta go to Austin or Dallas and those from the municipal seat tend to go to Florida, Indiana, Michigan or Georgia. Many from Tilaco go to Houston, although at least a few have gone as far north as Nebraska and Michigan. The money these migrants send back to their families is extremely important to the economy. Landa and other municipalities hold a yearly event at Christmastime in Jalpan de Serra to honor those migrants from the U.S. who are visiting families. At the beginning of December, many of these migrants come back for the feast of Our Lady of the Immaculate Conception, often driving down in pickup trucks and wearing cowboy clothing. The event often features musical styles popular in Texas and also honors these migrants.

The major feast days in the municipality include the spring equinox (March 21) in La Vuelta, feast of Isidore the Laborer, (May 15) in Encino Solo, Foundation Day (May 25) in Agua Zarca, Feast of the Sacred Heart (June 16) in La Reforma, Virgin of Mercy (September 24) in La Lagunita, Francis of Assisi (October 4) in Tilaco, and the Virgin of Guadalupe (December 12) in Valle de Guadalupe. Another traditional festival celebrated throughout the municipality is Day of the Dead, which is commemorated from 31 October to 2 November, with Huapango music, fireworks and other activities. The Feast Day of Our Lady of the Immaculate Conception in Landa is 25 September, celebrated with masses, processions, offerings, dance, music and fireworks. The main feast day for Tilaco is 4 October, in honor of Francis of Assisi, celebrated with masses, processions, dance, including the dance of Moors and Christians, music and fireworks.

Huapango is the dominant traditional music, especially the form called Huapango arribeño, but Huapango abajeño is also played. Typical dishes include nopals with pipian sauce, grilled nopal, river shrimp prepared various ways, atole, beans with nopal, pulque bread, enchiladas in various styles, sweets made from squash seeds, peanuts and squash, gorditas, pacholes, and sacahuil (a very large tamale). Creatures called "duendes" are often claimed to be seen in the area, especially in areas where there are horses.

== The churches ==
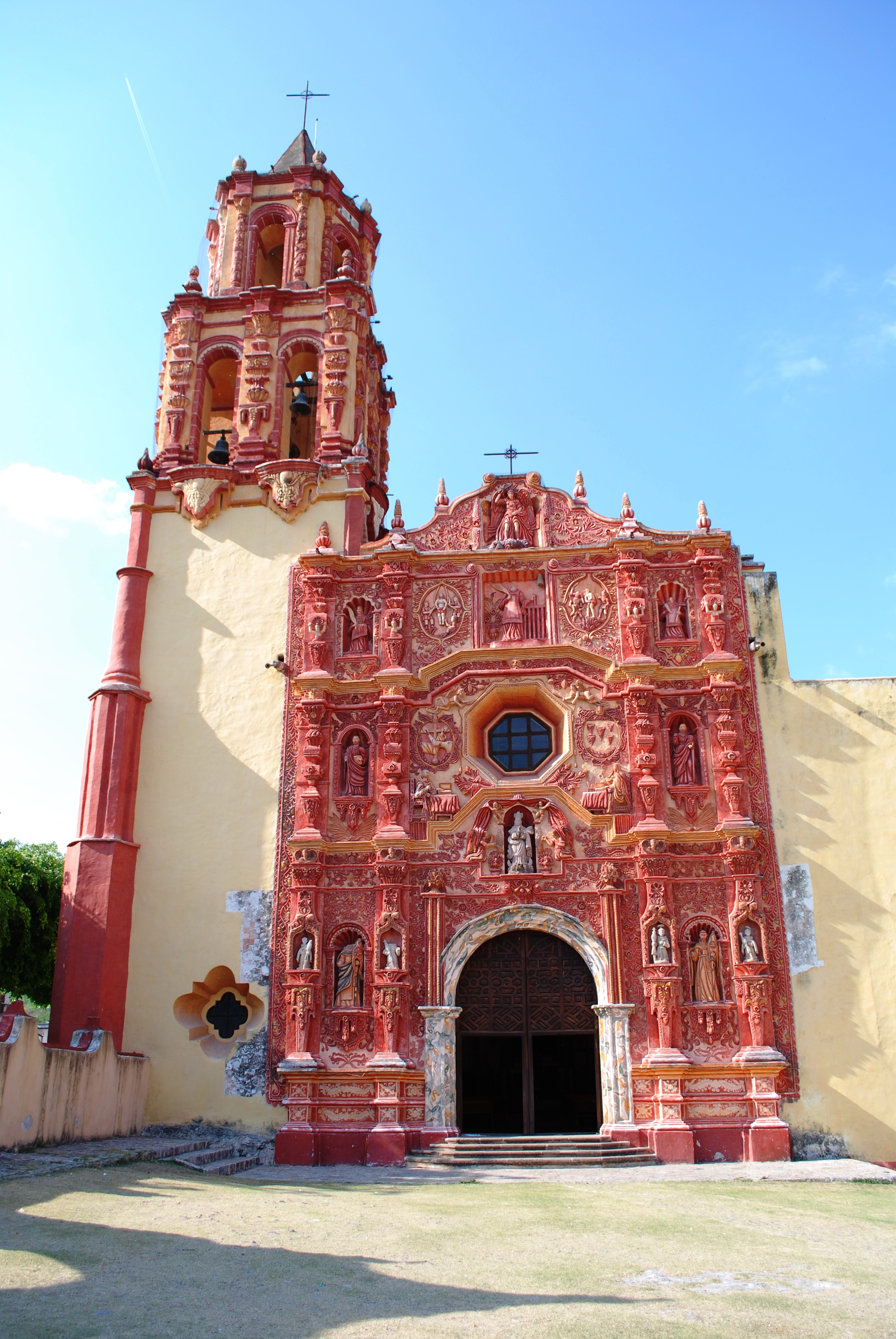
Facade of the Landa church

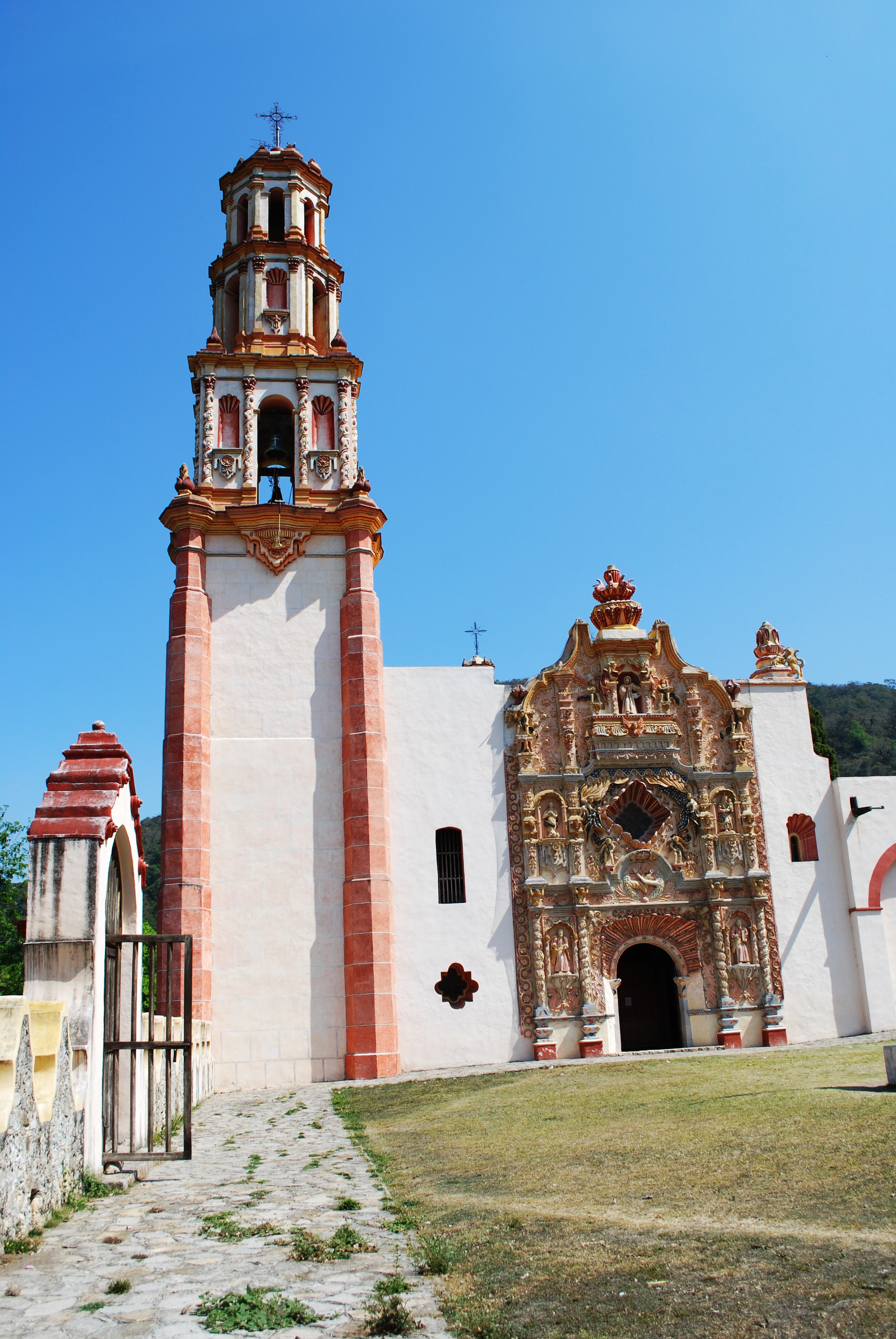
Facade of the Tilaco church

The municipality is home to two of the five Franciscan missions in the Sierra Gorda, which were registered together at a World Heritage Site in 2003. The mission complexes standing today were constructed with stone and mortar under the leadership of Junípero Serra after he took over evangelization of the area in 1750. However, both sites had been Augustinian missions earlier in the colonial period, and the Franciscan missions themselves were founded in the 1740s. After the missions were handed over to regular clergy in 1770, they deteriorated over the centuries. Restoration work on all five churches began from 1979 to 1985, initially focusing on the integrity of the structures and the facades. From 1991 to 1997, restoration of the towns around the missions, including work on monuments, plazas, fountains, building facades, paving streets with stone and more were undertaken. From the late 1990s to the early 2000s, restoration of interiors were done, including to altars, choir areas, organs and paintings. Much of the work was done to encourage tourism to the area, and the work cost anywhere from one to two million pesos for each church.

The Santa María del Agua de Landa is dedicated to Our Lady of the Immaculate Conception. The Franciscan mission was founded in 1744, the work on the current complex was done between 1761 and 1768, the last of the five mission complexes built. Its construction is generally attributed to Friar Miguel de la Campa, but a number of other Franciscans were active in the area at the same time such as José de la Sierpe, Domingo de Arroyabe, Esteban de Basabe, Palóu y Pedro José Lugo Perez, Antonio Paterna Ramos de Lora and José Campos. According to legend, when the Landa mission was being built, there was a small stream that flowed from the Cerro de San Esteban past the mission site. Workers used the water from this stream to quench their thirst. When the complex was finished, the stream dried up and disappeared.

The Landa mission is the most elaborately adorned and considered to have the most equilibrium in its composition. It contains a chapel, sacrament portal, baptistery, sacristy, cloister, atrium and garden area. The atrium is bordered by a wall with access on three sides. In the center is an atrium cross and there are stone paths in the interior of the atrium. It has a narrow bell tower, which is unified with the facade, which is primarily in ochre tones. The main portal includes a very large number of Baroque style ornaments, with vegetative elements and angels with support curtains. There is an image of Our Lady of the Immaculate Conception, along with a number of saints including James of the Marches, Bernardino of Siena, John of Capistrano and Francis of Assisi. On the sides of the choir window, there are two important Franciscans, Duns Scotus and María de Ágreda, along with the coat of arms of the order. At the summit in the center, there is an image of the Archangel Michael defeating a demon. The facade has a number of indigenous elements, including an indigenous headdress on the head of the Archangel Michael, but it is not obvious.

For Landa, the mission was restored at a cost of one million pesos. The main plaza was also restored with items such as benches and lighting added. Lighting was later added to the mission itself. During restoration work in 1985, a mastodon bone fossil was found at the base of the church.

The Tilaco mission contains a choir area, baptistery, sacristy, cloister, chapels and gardens. The mission was built on a mostly leveled incline. Its bell tower is separate from the body of the church, but connected through the baptistery. Structurally, the tower functions as a buttress. It is the smallest and simplest of the five missions. The main doorway is guarded by sculptures of Saints Peter and Paul. There are two niches with Saint Joseph with the Child Jesus and one with an image of the Immaculate Conception. Between the two, there is a dove, which represents the Holy Spirit. Above this, there is a rhomboid choir window marked by curtains supported by two angels. An image of Francis of Assisi is at the top of the portal surrounded by cherubs, some of which are reclined against pre-Hispanic style eagles. There are also four columns, each one supported by a mermaid. Mermaids are not often seen in colonial architecture and it is not known why they were included. Much of the rest of the portal is decorated with flowers and vines along with a representation of the cord Franciscans use to tie their habits.

To encourage tourism to the mission, basic services were installed. There was also restoration of the main plaza and many of the facades around the mission church as well as paving work, which cost about 1.5 million pesos.

== Geography ==
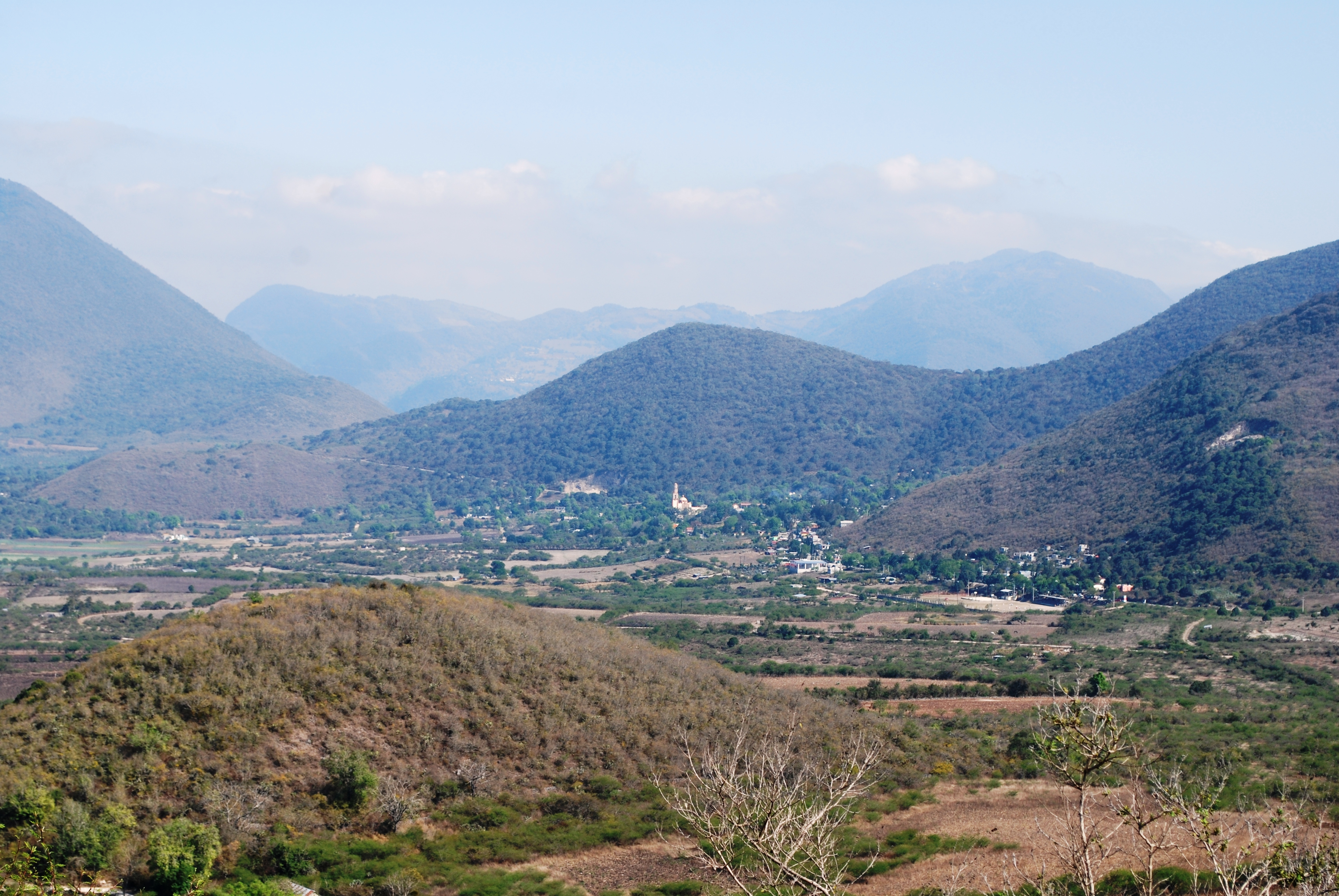
View of the Tilaco Valley

The municipality is part of the Sierra Gorda region, which is centered on northern Querétaro state. This region is a branch of the Sierra Madre Oriental, consisting of mountain chains that parallel the Gulf of Mexico. This land was sea bed 100 million years ago, which formed ancient sedimentary rock, mostly limestone, which easily erodes. This makes the area part of the Huasteca Karst. Landa de Matamoros is completely within the Sierra Gorda Biosphere Reserve of Querétaro, which was established in 1997. Of the biosphere's nucleus, 1,250 hectares are within the municipality. Over eighty five percent of the territory is mountainous and rugged with inclines of over 25%. These are mostly found in the south, southeast and northeast. Main elevations include Cerro de Tejocote (2720 masl), La Cebadilla (2560 masl), Cerro Grande de San Juan (1580 masl), Piedra Encimada (1620 masl), La Barca (1380 masl) and Los Orujos (1260 masl). There are a limited number of small valleys, including Plan de Hongos, Tilaco, Tres Lagunas, Valle de Guadalupe and Acatitlán de Zaragoza. These areas are mostly covered by forests. Semi flat areas are those with gradients under 25%, with accounts for about 3.5% of the territory. Much of this area is either forested or arid. Flat lands with gradients of less than 5% correspond to about 11.2% of the municipality. This is where most agriculture takes place, mostly during the rainy season. Most of the flatter areas of the municipality have rich sedimentary deposits of topsoil over a bed of limestone, which was former seabed. The limestone and other sedimentary rock erode fairly easily, which has led to the formation of caverns and pit caves (locally called "sótanos") dispersed throughout the municipality. The pit caves generally run from 400 to 600 meters in depth. Many have straight drops of between 50 and 100 meters, and end with a flat bottom with vegetation and wildlife. The largest is the Tilaco pit cave, 649 meters deep.

The territory is a part of the Pánuco River basin. In the north the main rivers are the San Juan and the Tangojo, which the Tancuilín is the most important within the south. The Moctezuma River runs along the municipality's border with Hidalgo. Other flowing water includes the Río Verdito and a number of fresh water springs and arroyos, most of which run only during the rainy season. As most residents of the municipality do not have potable water piped to their homes, there are large water storage facilities in Encino Solo, Landa, Tres Lagunas, Otates, Santa Inés, Malpaís and Acatitlán de Zaragoza from which trucks deliver water to home storage facilities. Many homes also have their own systems to catch rainfall and runoff during the rainy season.

Most of the municipality is covered in various types of mostly deciduous forest, with leaves fully or partially fall during the dry season and the very cold weeks in December and January. Forests of pine, red and white cedar and sweetgum are prominent in the higher elevations. In the hot and dry areas, various cactus and other arid area plants such as cats claw, biznaga cactus, maguey, organ cactus, and nopals can be found. Landa has one of the few mesophile forests in the state of Querétaro, which is mostly found in steep canyon areas between 800 and 2000 masl. Between 600 and 800 meters, the mesophile forest blends with tropical rainforest such as in the bottom of the Tancuilin Canyon. A study of flora in the municipality counted 774 species of vascular plants, with the most diversity found in old growth areas where the thick tree canopy traps moisture. These areas have trees that measure thirty to forty meters in height. Most of the plant species are classified as herbs, followed by bushes, then trees, reeds, epiphyte and parasitic plants. Ninety one percent are classified as tropical vegetation. The variety of species here represents about 25% of the plant diversity in Mexico. A recently discovered species, named Physalis queretaroensis, is a rare plant restricted to the municipality. It is related to P. volubilis, which is restricted to Jalisco and Michoacán, but differs in form and insertion of the leaves and vestiture. It is an herb that grows about seventy cm in height in the forest areas of oak, pine and mesophile forests in altitudes between 1700 and 1850 masl.

However, much of the forest is fragmented and highly disturbed. The best-conserved areas are in the canyons and steep inclines that are hard to access, such as the Tancuilín Canyon around Neblinas and El Humo. Another area which is well preserved are the highest elevations of the mountains including the area around La Joya del Hielo, La Florida and La Yesca up to Puerto Hondo. In other areas, forests are broken up with patches of farmland or pasture. Despite being in the biosphere reserve, destruction of the environment still proceeds, even in areas considered to be nuclei such as La Joya del Hielo and Llano Chiquito. Landa de Matamoros, along with Arroyo Seco, have begun controlled pasturing using electric fences, which also allows forage plants to recover. They are also developing hydroponic forage, which is grown in water, without soil.

This mesophile forest is found in the wettest part of the Sierra Gorda, where the moisture can reach the east facing slopes. Most of the area is classed as moist and semi hot. (A) C (fm) by the Koppen classification, or moist and semi hot, with most rain falling in the summer rainy season but rain and fog can be found at other times too, especially in the highest elevations. The average annual rainfall is 920mm although this has varied significantly in recent years. Temperatures vary widely depending on altitude. The high mountains areas are the coldest, experiencing freezing temperatures regularly, with the lower flatter lands having more tropical or arid land characteristics. The average annual temperature is 22C, with May as the hottest month, with temperatures rising as high as 43C. In January, there can be temperatures as low as -2C. In the 2000s, areas of the state have experienced hard freezes on several occasions, with temperatures as low as -10C. These freezing temperatures are due to cold fronts coming from the north and west. These usually only produce fog and light rain, with stronger ones causing freezing temperatures. Freezing temperatures have caused emergency conditions requiring interventions by civil authorities and have also led to loss of pasture for cattle. During the rainy season, large storms can cause severe flooding along rivers such as the Moctezuma and Tancuilín. In 2010, flooding damaged crops in El Naranjo and El Lobo, with dozens of hectares of corn damaged. The rugged geography makes roads vulnerable to landslides, with rocks up to 1.5 tons falling onto Highway 120. Recent years of drought have stressed the trees of the area and have made them vulnerable to insects. Wildlife includes pumas, bobcats, coyotes, foxes, armadillos, badgers, rabbits, white-tailed deer, squirrels, roadrunners, various lizards, and a wide variety of birds including macaws and parrots.

The varied terrain has made for a number of natural attractions. The community of Río Verdito has a waterfall located above the El Lobo-Agua Zarca road. The location has various natural pools of water and places to camp. The Tancuilín River has canyons. The community of Tangojo on the Moctezuma River is noted for the fishing of tilapia, carp and river shrimp called acamaya. There are also facilities for kayaking and rappelling. The Santa Martha rest stop is on the Landa de Matamoros Xilitla highway at KM 230.5. It is a forested area with pines and cedars. The area has picnic tables. La Joya del Hielo occupies a small depression high in the mountains. This makes its vegetation unique, especially with the abundant presence of magnolia trees. It is considered to be one of the nucleus areas of the biosphere reserve.

== History ==
"Landa" is derived from a Chichimeca expression "lan-há", which means muddy place. "de Matamoros" was added to the name in 1919, by a state decree to honor insurgent Mariano Matamoros who was here during the Mexican War of Independence. The coat of arms contains a number of symbols related to its history. The indigenous phrase (lan-há) and an image of the mission relate to its indigenous past and Spanish conquest. The name of Matamoros appears for historical reasons as well. Concentric circles signify the encounter of indigenous and Spanish cultures. The lifestyle of the area is represented by a maguey plant, an ear of corn, the sun, the mountains, a drum and a book. Leaves and fruits found in the upper and lower parts indicate the indigenous respect for nature as well symbols of greatness. To the left of the mission church, there is a representation of the native dance of San Francisco de Asis church in Tilaco. Landa's identity as Mexican is represented by the national seal, the Mexican flag, and the flag of the Landa mission.

Landa de Matamoros is part of the heart of the Sierra Gorda. This region has been occupied for about 6000 years. In the Pre Classic and Classic periods, the Sierra Gorda had a number of small cities as the climate at that time was wetter than it is now. Most of the larger cities were south of the current municipalities due to mining activities and major trade routes, but there were cities and trade routes through here as well, connecting the area mostly with Huasteca areas to the east and other areas to the north. While most of the pre-Hispanic history of the area is dominated by peoples culturally related to the Huastecas, the site of the town of Landa de Matamoros is thought to have been first occupied by a group of Purépecha who migrated north from what is now Michoacán. As the climate of the Sierra Gorda dried out in the early Post Classic period, cities were abandoned for simpler hunter gatherer communities and there were migrations of Chichimecas, mostly Pames and Chichimeca Jonaz from the north. Landa would become Pame territory. The Pame would continue to dominate this area for the rest of the pre-Hispanic period, but small communities of Otomis and Huastecas would also be established as well. The Aztecs also made incursions here, which led to the formation of the Oxitilpa dominion, a commercially based political organization allied with the Aztecs. Aztec records indicate that the Sierra Gorda was a tributary area, but it is likely that the Aztecs only controls parts on the periphery up to the Pánuco River. This route leads to the modern settlement of Landa de Matamoros. However, archeological evidence so far is related to the Pame.

The Spanish made incursions into the area early in the colonial period, but the Chichimeca, especially the Jonaz, put up fierce resistance to their intrusions. This would keep the Spanish from fully dominating the area for two hundred years. The Pames were considered less resistant and as early as the 16th century, Augustinians from Xilitla and Franciscans from Michoacán founded missions in the Landa area. However, these would not remain permanently. The Spanish would break Chichimeca resistance in the Sierra Gorda in the 1740s, with the expeditions of José de Escandón, culminating in the Battle of Media Luna. To solidify these military gains, Franciscans founded new missions in this and other areas of northern Querétaro, the heart of the Sierra Gorda. These missions were taken over by Junípero Serra starting in 1750, who decided to have elaborate mission complexes built in five locations, two of which are in the municipality, in Landa de Matamoros and in Tilaco. In addition to evangelization, the missions worked to group the semi nomadic Pames into permanent communities centered on churches.

A smallpox epidemic in 1762 caused the deaths of 5,300 and depopulated some of the mission communities. After the missions were handed over to regular clergy in 1771, the indigenous population of five communities abandoned their homes for the mountains because of abuses and inability to understand the new priests.

During the Mexican War of Independence, various insurgents such as Ignacio and Rafael López Rayón, José María Liceaga, Julián and Francisco Villagrán and Luis Herrera found refuge here. The most important person to do so was Mariano Matamoros, who was here from 1807 to 1808. During this time, he offered his services as priest at the Landa mission church. In 1825, Landa was part of the municipality of Jalpan according to the first state constitution. Until 1917, Landa was a subdelegation of the district/municipality of Jalpan de Serra. In this year, it was made a full delegation, and the community of Landa was recognized as a town. In 1941, the delegation was converted into a free municipality.

There was unrest here during the Cristero War, with some taking up arms.

Like the rest of the Sierra Gorda, economic development has lagged behind other parts of Querétaro and Mexico, in part to the end of mining in neighboring municipalities and in part to the ruggedness of the region's terrain. From the last decades of the 20th century to the present, the economic marginalization of the area has given the municipality one of the highest rates of emigration. Most migrants go to the United States, and the money they send back has now become the major income for Landa and the rest of the Sierra Gorda. However, the migration is dangerous. In March and April 2010, seventeen residents of the municipality disappeared while en route to the United States. Most are believed to have been kidnapped by armed men while their bus was in the state of Tamaulipas, taken to work in fields growing drugs. As of March 2011, the men have yet to be found, although four men were arrested in connection with the incident, for threatening the families of the victims. The incident has provoked the municipal government to advise residents not to go the United States, especially not through routes controlled by drug traffickers.

Drug trafficking has been an issue within the municipality as well. In 2010, the Mexican Army identified a synthetic drug laboratories in the municipality. The lab was making crystal meth among other drugs and was the largest ever found in the state of Querétaro. This military has also been involved in the break up of a kidnapping ring as well. Two military bases have been proposed for the municipality along with another in neighboring Arroyo Seco, to guard the Querétaro/San Luis Potosí against drug trafficking. One reason for the base is that there is a lack of police in the area because of its poverty.

== Economy ==
The municipality has one of the lowest average incomes in Mexico. From the 1960s to the 1990, the percentage of economically active people in the municipality declined from 33.5% to 21.2%. It rose slightly to 22.1% in 2000. Over twelve percent of the employment is working in the family without pay. Women make up less than seventeen percent of the paid workforce. To improve nutrition in the impoverished area, amaranth has been promoted as an alternative grain to corn and wheat because of its exceptional nutritive qualities. This is a grain native to Mexico, but its use was prohibited and or discouraged by Spanish authorities because of it religious connections.

Just over 54% of the working population is dedicated to agriculture, livestock and forestry. Agriculture is not a principal economic activity due to the lack of arable land. Most land is used for livestock and forestry. The agriculture that is practiced is traditional and in small plots. Around 3,400 hectares are farmed during the rainy season, principally in Landa, Encino Solo, Palo Verde, La Reforma, La Lagunita, Otates, Tres Lagunas, Acatitlán de Zaragoza, Tilaco, and Valle de Guadalupe. Most crops consist of corn, beans, sorghum, peas and chickpeas and coffee. Fruit trees include orange, peach, papaya, lime, avocado, grapefruit, lemon, sapote, plum, apple and mango. There is also sugar cane and coffee grown. The most important natural resource is forest area. These forests include pine, oak, oyamel, white cedar and strawberry trees. Some fine woods such as red cedar and walnut can also be found. Logging occurs on about 14390 hectares, or about seventeen percent of the municipality's territory. Most are located near the communities of El Madroño, Tres Lagunas and Agua Zarca. Most forest lands are ejidos or otherwise communally owned, with the rest privately owned. There are sixty eight locations dedicated to lumber and over 500 dedicated to collecting other forest products. The declaration of the biosphere reserve has allowed for better control of illegal logging. There are some mineral deposits such as magnesium, silver and lead, but they have not been exploited due to the lack of geological studies. There is also a small petroleum deposit in Tres Lagunas.

About 63,700 hectares are dedicated to livestock such as cattle, pigs, sheep, goats, horses, various domestic fowl and bees. Most occurs in Landa, Agua Zarca, Otates, La Reforma, La Vuelta and Tres Lagunas because of the availability of natural and seeded pastures. Livestock raising has faced challenges due to recent climate changes in the municipality raising the cost of feeding the animals.

Over 18% of the working population is dedicated to mining, construction, industry and manufacturing. Industry is mostly limited to a number of handcrafts such as leather goods and ceramics and some food processing, especially related to corn. Some communities create handcrafts such as wool items, ceramics including jars and comals, palm mats, knitted items, copal incense and wood items such as toys and furniture.

Commerce and services provide over twenty one percent of the employment. The municipality has 195 commercial establishments mostly located in the larger communities. There are no municipal markets, but there are tianguis markets during the weeks in several locations especially the municipal seat, Tilaco, La Lagunita and Agua Zarca La Lagunita holds a large tianguis on Saturday. Most commerce is geared to local consumption and basic needs. There is some tourism, mostly associated with the two mission churches in Landa and Tilaco. There is only one two-star hotel in the community of El Lobo, with fifteen rooms and a restaurant.

It is not known exactly how many people from Querétaro go to work in the United States, nor how many come at the end of the year to visit. Landa has one of the highest emigration rates in Querétaro. Most from Landa migrate to Texas, especially Houston. The dollars that return here have a large impact in Landa and other municipalities of the Sierra Gorda region. It is estimated that between 50,000 and US$100,000 per day comes into the Sierra Gorda region, or about 18 million per year based on estimates of money changed in the area. This quantity is more than the entire municipal budge of Landa and accounts for most of the money residents live on, dwarfing the amount made through the local economy of farming and forestry. The currency itself circulates here, accepted in a number of businesses. In the community of Tres Lagunas, there are three hundred families with at least one member from each in the United States. All of its streets, including the entrance road are dirt. Many of the houses are now of brick or block, with satellite TV, paid for by remittance money, but there is no piped water. Dollars sent back by migrants in the United States is not only received directly by families, it is also used to fund public works projects through organizations such as the Federacion de Clubes de Migrantes de la Sierra Gorda, which includes six groups from Landa de Matamoros. Much of this money is matched two for one by the Mexican federal government. The first community to benefit from this problem was La Lagunita, with an initial offering of US$5,000. Most works focus on paving, water systems, drainage and electricity. This money is so important to Landa and other Sierra Gorda municipalities that there is an annual event dedicated to them each December in Jalpan de Serra, which Landa partially sponsors, called "Día del Paisano".

== Archeology ==
There are two archeological zones/former ceremonial sites in El Lobo and a cave area in the community of Neblinas. There are small indigenous temples in Potero del Llano, Agua Zarca, El Sabinito and La Campana, which contain stone and clay idols linked to the Pame, Huasteco and Jonaz cultures. The La Campana site in the municipality has been sacked and destroyed, despite recent measures taken to protect local sites. The crime was reported by archeologists María Teresa Muñoz Espinoza and José Carlos Castañeda Reyes, who state that this is the most important site of the area. The site belongs to the Huasteca culture and dated to about 600 CE. It is located between the communities of La Campana and Las Ánimas. The site has also been damaged by landslides, possibly provoked by the illegal mining of white sand in the area. This is where the worst damage to the site is. The site measures thirty eight meters long and five meters in depth. Thefts include a complete burial with various ceramic objects. A large grinding stone was destroyed intentionally. The site was discovered about sixty years ago but there has been no budget to excavate it formally. However, there have been about 160 structured counted including platforms, plazas, patios and more. There is a push to cover and protect the area, especially that closest to where the sand mining occurs.

Fossils found in the area include those of marine life in the community of El Madroño and Pleistocene animals in the municipal seat, principally that of mastodons. The Sierra Gorda region 100 million years ago was sea bed. The El Madroño fossil deposit is one of the most important of its kind in Mexico as it is the only one with such a wide diversity of species in excellent state of conservation. Many of the species found have been identified and include a large number of invertebrate species and species not before found in the region. However, research into the area has not been concluded.
