= Landa de Matamoros Municipality =

Coordinates: 21.2167°N 99.3333°W

Landa de Matamoros
- Municipality
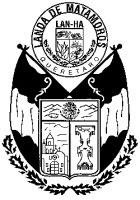
- Coat of arms
- Interactive map of Landa de Matamoros
- Country: Mexico
- State: Querétaro
- Time zone: UTC-6 (Central)

Landa de Matamoros is a municipality in the central Mexican state of Querétaro.

The seat is Landa de Matamoros.

== The municipality ==
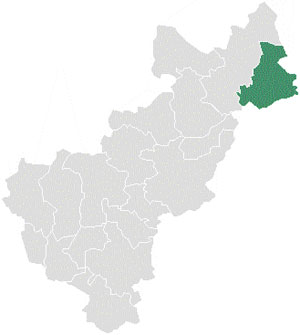
Map of the municipality

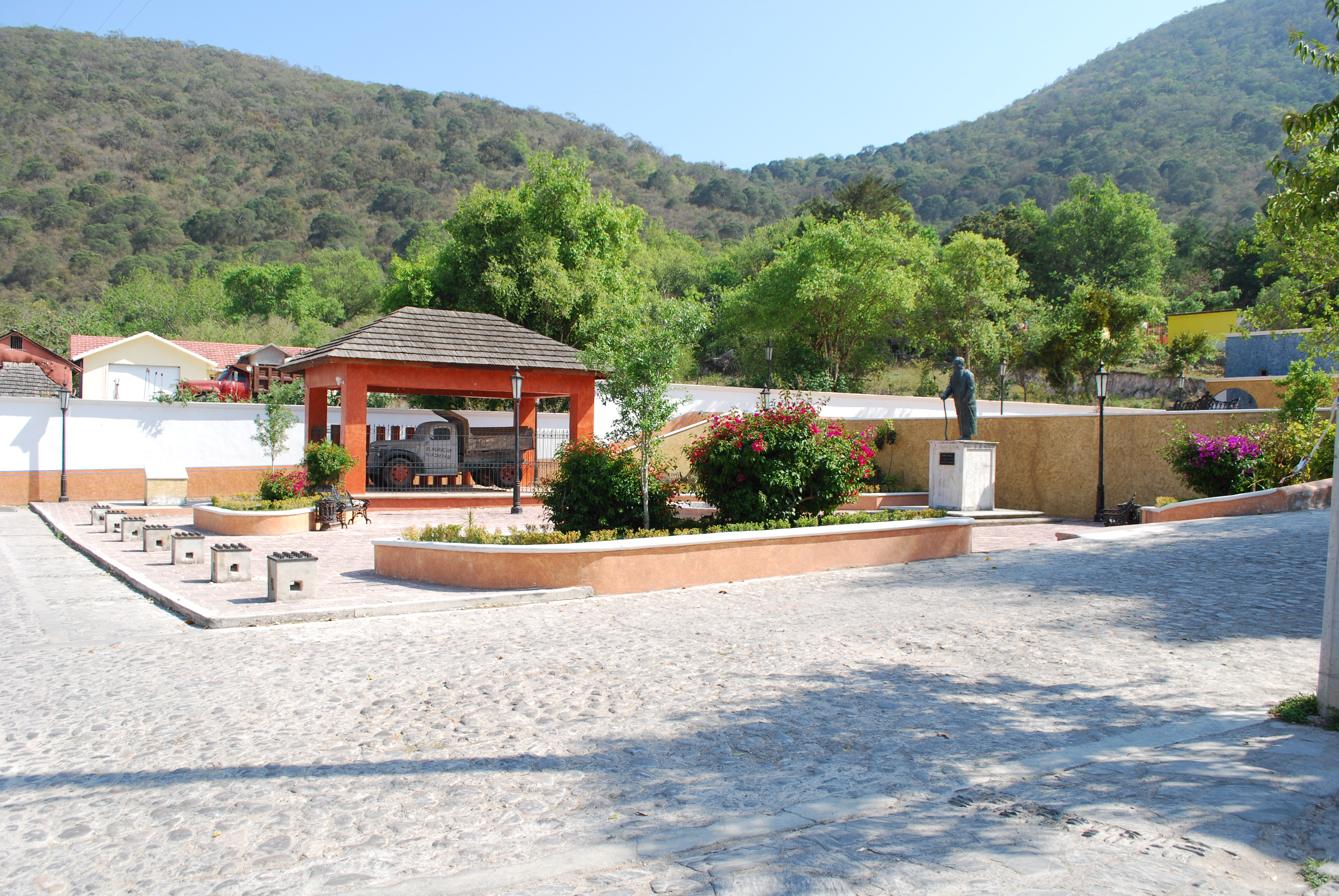
Padre Miracle square in Tilaco

The town of Landa de Matamoros is the local governing authority for 130 communities, even though only 1,418 of a total municipal population of 18,905 live in the town proper. These combined communities cover a territory of 840.2 km^{2}, the third largest in Querétaro. The municipality is divided into six "micro-regions": Landa, La Lagunita, Agua Zarca, El Lobo, Valle de Guadalupe and Tilaco. The municipality is located in the far northeast of the state, with altitudes that vary from 350 to 2100 masl. It borders only one other municipality in Querétaro, Jalpan de Serra. It borders the state of San Luis Potosí to the north and east, and with the state of Hidalgo to the east and south. The municipality is headed by a municipal president and the government has nine officials called "regidors".

As of 2000, there were 4,311 homes in the municipality, with an average occupation of 4.78, which is above state average. This has been the case for at least forty years. Most homes are owned by their residents and made of materials such as cement, wood and laminate. About 60% of these homes have running water, 80% have public lighting, 80% have garbage collection and 75% have police services. The municipal government is not in charge of water or sewer services. Landline telephone service is relatively recent, with only seventeen of the most important communities having access. Mail service is not comprehensive. The municipality has 53 preschools, 57 primary schools, 26 middle schools, including twelve that are distance education, and two that are technical schools. High school level education is distance through video at Tres Lagunas, Tilaco and Agua Zarca. For higher education, it is necessary to leave the municipality. Most go to Jalpan de Serra or the Querétaro state capital to study. A technical college program was recently opened associated with the Universidad Autónoma de Querétaro. Forty eight percent of those over 15 have not finished primary school and twenty-two percent are illiterate. The migratory situation is diminishing the number of school age children in the municipality for a number of years, with the absence most noted in the primary schools. These children leave, accompanying their parents to the U.S.

The municipality has 180.6 km of paved highway and rural roads. 42.5 km is principal highway; 20.1 km is secondary road and 118 is rural road. There is bus service linking the municipal seat to San Juan del Río, Querétaro and San Luis Potosí. There are also taxis. The municipal seat has various areas for sports including multiple use fields and a grass soccer field.

The municipality consists of a number of communities that share a local government in the municipal seat of Landa de Matamoros. Tilaco comes from Nahuatl and means "in black water". The community is head of a municipal delegation containing six sub delegations. Its primary economic activities are agriculture, livestock and tourism. It is 26 km from the municipal seat and has a population of 584. It is the seat of Centro Estratégico Communitario Microrregion03 covering thirteen communities with a population of 3,363. Tilaco is home to the other Franciscan mission accredited to Junípero Serra. The mission has a Baroque facade with three levels in which saints, mermaids, coats of arms, columns and other ornamental details. It also contains a community museum called the Museo Comunitario Lucio Balderas Márquez, which displays historical photographs, documents and more related to the community and municipality. The feast of Francis of Assisi in Tilaco takes place over the week of 4 October, with activities such as events called jaripeos, horse racing, popular dances, sports and traditional dances in traditional outfits, which is unique to the town. It is off the main highway of the municipality, with access by a narrow roads that leads to it from La Lagunita, a road built by the parish priest and Juan Cesar Lugo, a migrant worker from La Lagunita. The town of Tilaco received a parish priest, a man by the name of Francisco Isidro Pinol Miracle in 1958. At the time, the town was cut off from the rest of the municipality. The priest worked hard to have a road built to connect Tilaco with Highway 120 and also work to have the mission church restored, using an old truck lent to him by Juan Cesar Lugo. Miracle died in 2003, but he is honored in the town by a square named after him.

Agua Zarca is 51 km from the municipal seat and has a population of 1357. It is a municipal delegation with twenty one subdelegations, the largest in the municipality. It is the seat of Centro Estratégico Communitario Microrregion04 with thirty communities with a population of 6302. It has a community museum, Museo Comunitario General Porfirio Rubio, which exhibits historical photographs, arms, farm tools, and research documents regarding the families of this community. It has a church that was constructed in the 1950s.

Tangojó is located on the Moctezuma River at the lowest point in the state of Querétaro at 320 masl. Most residents make their living from fishing river shrimp, tilapia, carp and other species. There is also ecotourism in the form of hiking, camping, and horseback riding. It is located 72 km from the municipal seat, past the community of Tilaco. Tangojó is from Huasteca and means "place where they fish".

El Lobo is located 28 km from the municipal seat and has a population of 664. Most residents are dedicated to livestock and forestry. It is a municipal delegation with seven sub delegations. It is the Centro Estratégico Communitario Microrregion06.

La Lagunita is located on the San Juan del Río-Xilitla highway, eight km from the municipal seat. It is primarily dedicated to commerce with a population of 505. It is head of the Centro Estratégico Communitario Microrregion02 with eighteen communities with a total population of 2575.

Tres Lagunas is located 37 km from the municipal seat at the far northeast of the municipality. It has a population of 657 with seasonal agriculture and livestock as primary economic activities. It is the seat of Centro Estratégico Communitario Microrregion05 with twelve communities and a population of 2489.

Other communities include Las Pilas, El Madroño and Río Verdito.Las Pilas is located 2 km from the municipal seat where there are important sources of water stored for various communities. El Madroño is characterized by its gray-brown and red soils. Underneath there is a base of limestone containing numerous 100-million-year-old marine fossils from when this area was under the sea. It is located 25 km from the municipal seat. Río Verdito is a community located next to a river of the same name, which has a waterfall. It is 46 km from the municipal seat.
