= Dragon Dance Theatre =

Canadian theatre collective, founded 1976

The Dragon Dance Theatre is a collective theatre and giant puppet company founded in Vermont, USA, in 1976. The company has created and produced original theatre productions and the Pan-American Puppetry Arts Institute in Mexico, Nicaragua, Argentina, Peru, the US, France and Finland. In 2001, the company moved its base to Quebec, Canada, where the company has also had theatre projects.

== History ==
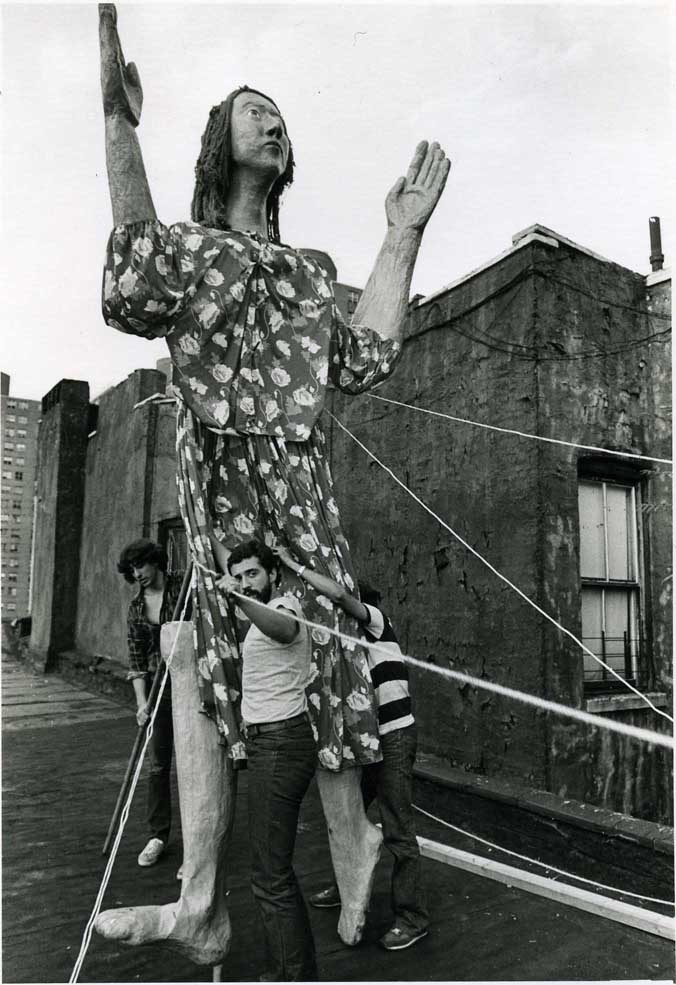
Elsa -- appearing in Backyards, directed by Briski, performed in Spanish Harlem, 1985. Photo: Andrew Popper.

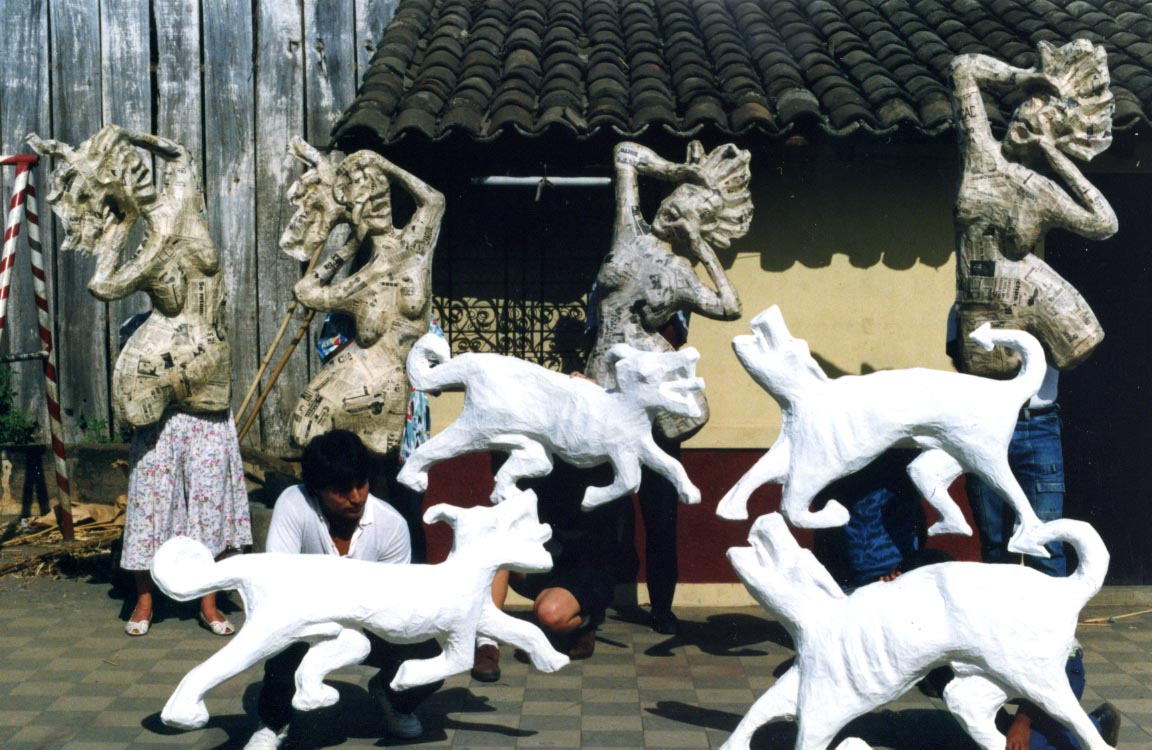
Contra Lo Fatal, after a poem by Ruben Dario, directed by Sam Kerson, performed in Monimbo, Nicaragua, 1987.

The Dragon Dance Theatre was founded in 1976 by Sam Kerson and a small group of friends. In its history the company has re-elaborated myths from Sumer, Greece and the pre-Hispanic tradition in America from a contemporary perspective in theatrical spectacles. The productions are ecologically conscious and include social criticism and the use of traditional stories pertaining to the communities where the spectacles are performed.

From 1973 till 1998, Dragon Dance Theatre presented its own original works annually at the Bread and Puppet Theatre's Domestic Resurrection Circus. The shows featured Tomas Luna, Roberto Villaseñor, Ignacio Miranda, Ricardo Flores, Jerome Lipani and musically, Dan Roth, Susan Bettmann, Jairo Siqueiros, Dennis Darah, among others.

In 1973, Sam Kerson met with Argentine director and actor Norman Briski, who was living in exile in Cuzco, Peru. The pair collaborated on projects during the early years of the Dragon Dance Theatre, including the show Puzzles, which Briski directed. Kerson learned from Briski his technique of collective creation, which includes improvisation, dramatization and socialization of characters and ideas; all of which came from the social movements in Argentina.

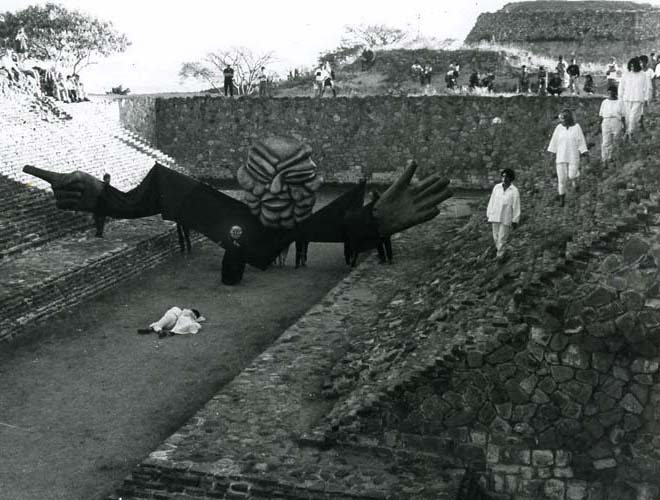
Sol y Luna -- Dragon Dance Theatre in Monte Albán, Oaxaca, Mexico, directed by Sam Kerson and Roberto Villaseñor, 1994. Photo: Sam Kerson.

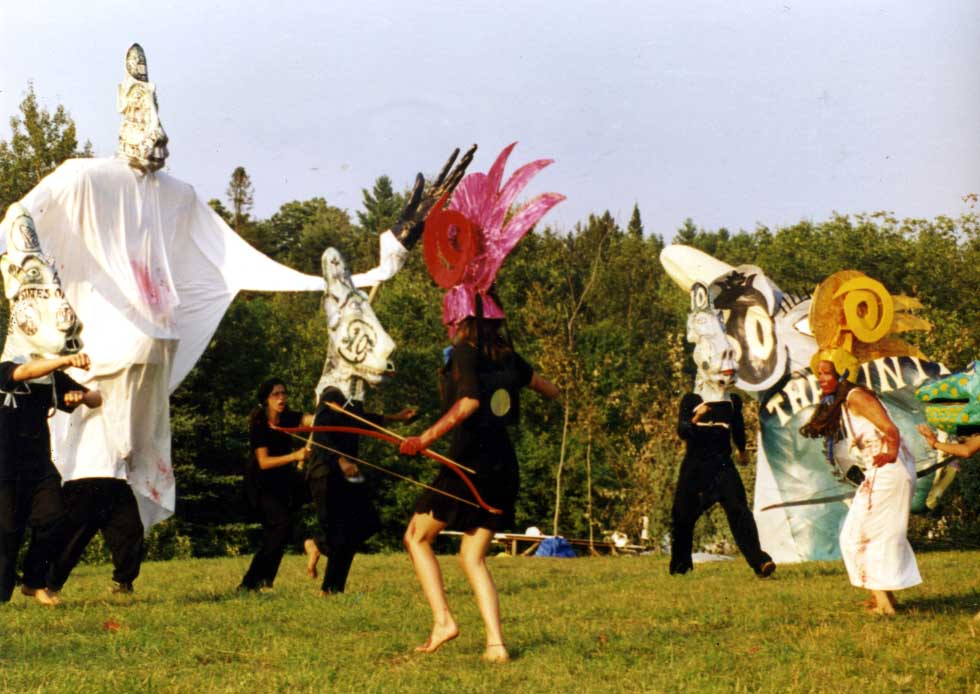
Ubu Roi -- Dragon Dance Theatre, directed by Sam Kerson, performed at the Bread and Puppet Circus, Glover, Vermont, 1998.

The Dragon Dance Theatre had projects in Nicaragua during the last years of the Nicaraguan Revolution, from 1987 to 1992. This influenced the company to get involved in and produce political productions, such as Death and The General.

From the mid-1990s to the mid-2010s, the company produced works of collective creation with indigenous and mestizo communities in Mexico, especially in the states of Querétaro, Veracruz and Oaxaca, where the company staged, in close collaboration with the Mexican director Roberto Villaseñor, the series of productions Sol y Luna, a wide-ranging theater project that was presented on the archeological ruins of Monte Albán in Oaxaca, between the years 1994 and 1996.

== Collective creation ==
Since 1994, the company organizes the Pan-American Puppetry Arts Institute, artists’ residencies with the participation and collaboration of international artists and the local community. These workshops include plastic arts, theater, giant masks making and painting, the art of narration, music and dance.

The work of the company is based on collective creation. The spectacles are produced with and in the communities, with the local language and in common spaces. The topics usually come from a legend or a folkloric tale of the region where the project is realized, adapted to contemporary dilemmas.

== Late and current projects ==
The Dragon Dance Theatre changed its base from Vermont, USA, to Quebec, Canada, in 2001. There the Quebec artist Katah joined the company and became director of international projects.

From 2000 to 2015, the company produced several spectacles in Jalpan de Serra, in the Mexican state of Querétaro, with the support and collaboration of the Museo Historico de la Sierra Gorda and its director, Junipero Cabrera Berrones. The themes of the projects have ranged from the lives of Frida Kahlo, Diego Rivera and Leon Trotsky; the fragility of the ecosystems under exploitation in Mexico; and the life and work of Junipero Serra and the indigenous resistance to Spanish colonialism in the Sierra Gorda area.

In 2008 the company produced the movie El Río de la Vida (The River of Life) in the indigenous Zapotec community of San Blas Atempa, in the Isthmus of Tehuantepec, in Oaxaca. The story is embedded in the celebration of the Day of the Dead in Southern Mexico, and it's an adaptation of La Tonka de Madera, a short story by the local artist Maira Jimenez Desales, who participated in the movie as a producer and leading actress. The documentalist Edson Caballero was in charge of recording and photography.

Between 2005 and 2015, the Dragon Dance Theatre organized three artist residencies in the north of Finland collaborating with Anna-Kaisa Järvi, who was the producer of the three events. The spectacles were adaptations of various Kalevala (the Finnish epic) poems and received coverage and positive reviews in the regional papers. The main theme of the productions was ecological and political awareness, the last one especially concerning nuclear power.

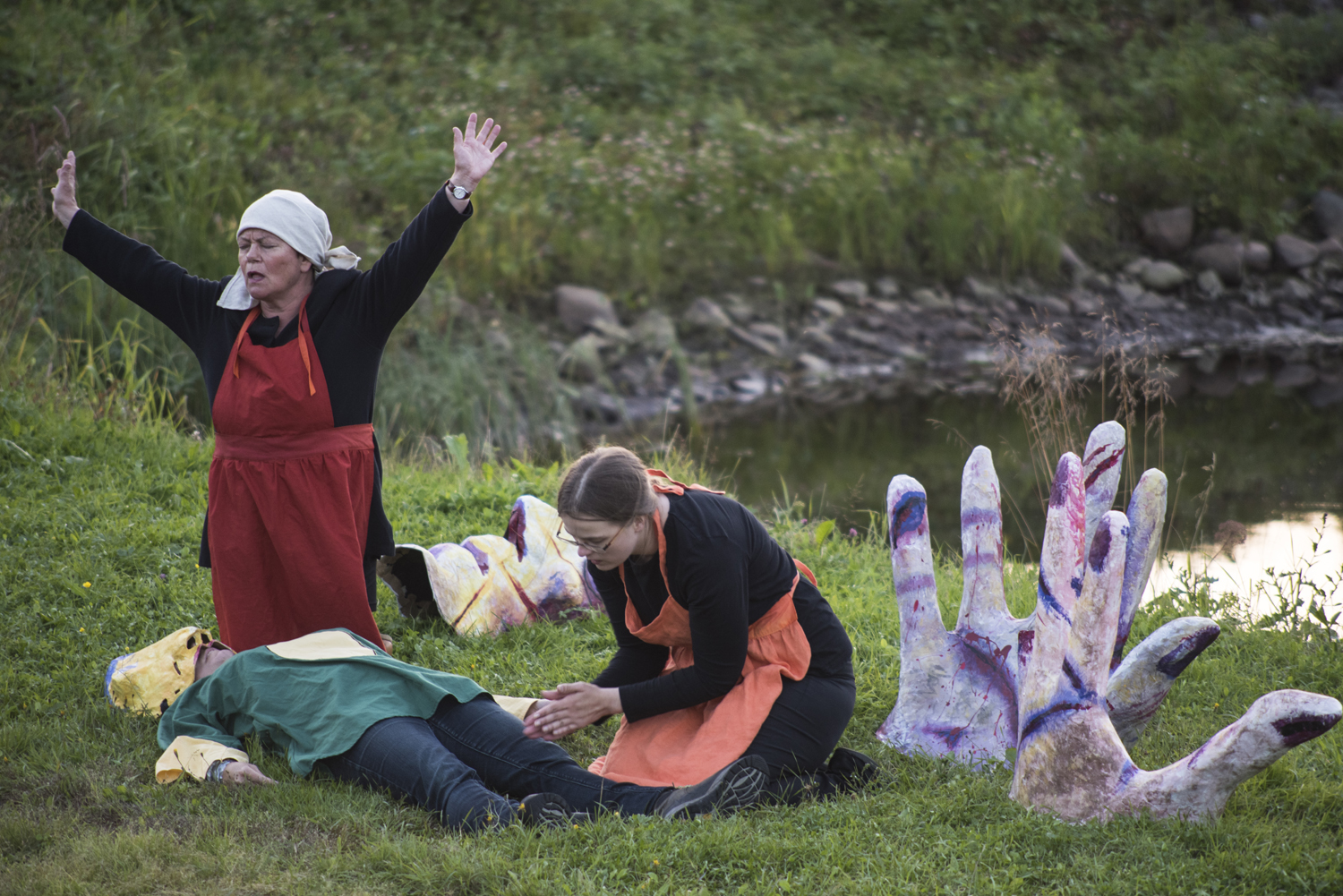
Lemminkainen in Tuonela, directed by Sam Kerson, performed in Ii, Finland, 2015. From left to right: Sanna Kuovisto, Katah, Eve Riikkinen. Photo: Maija Laurinen.

In 2012–14, the company also produced theater projects of collective creation in the Sierra de Otontepec, in the north of the Mexican state of Veracruz. Central to the productions have been themes of social conflict, the black population of the region, feminism and agriculture. The spectacles were co-produced by Arturo Tristan, a cultural promoter of the region.
