= Jalpan de Serra =

Jalpan de Serra, Querétaro
- Town
- Jalpan de Serra
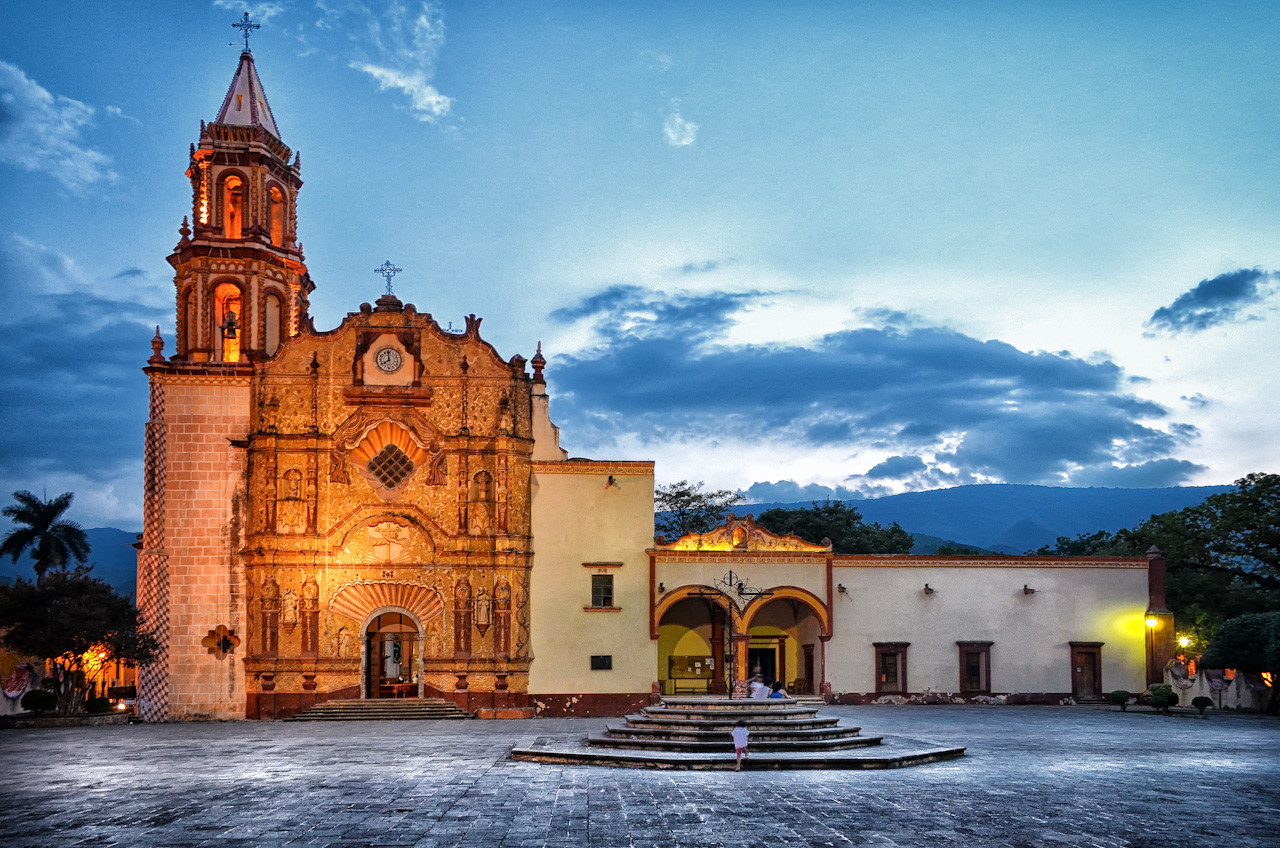
- Temple built by Junípero Serra between 1751 and 1758.

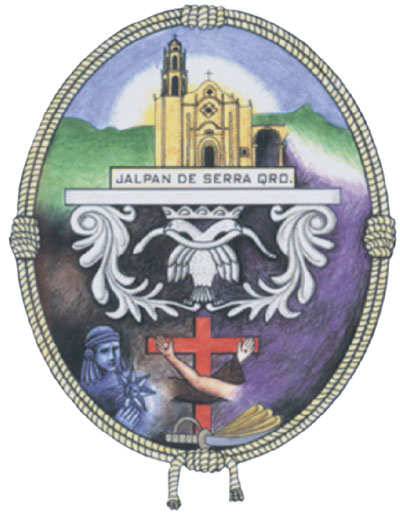
- Coat of arms

- Location in Mexico Jalpan de Serra, Querétaro (Mexico)
- Coordinates: 21°13′00″N 99°28′21″W
- Country: Mexico
- State: Querétaro
- Founded: 1744

Government

Area
  - Total: 1,185 km^{2} (458 sq mi)
- Elevation (of seat): 760 m (2,490 ft)

Population (2005) Municipality
  - Total: 22,025
  - Seat: 8,947
- Time zone: UTC-6 (Central (US Central))
- Postal code (of seat): 68522
- Website: www.municipiodejalpan.gob.mx (in Spanish)

Jalpan de Serra (Spanish: [ˈxalpan de ˈsera]) is a city in Jalpan de Serra Municipality located in the north of the Mexican state of Querétaro. It is located in the heart of an important ecological zone called the Sierra Gorda. It is also the site two of five Franciscan missions, including the first one, to have been built in the mid-18th century, and declared a World Heritage Site in 2003. The municipality is also home to a small but important indigenous group called the Pame. However, the municipality has been losing population since the mid-20th century even though recent events such as the town being named a Pueblo Mágico have worked to create a tourism industry.

== The town ==
The town of Jalpan is the municipal seat, located 180 km from San Juan del Río on Federal Highway 120. This road then connects it to Xilitla in San Luis Potosí. It is also connected to Río Verde in SLP via interstate highway 69. Although officially classified as a city since 1904, the current population is only just under 9,000 people (2005). The main economic activities within the town proper are commerce, livestock production and agriculture.

The town is centered on its main square and one of the five Franciscan missions to be named a World Heritage Site in 2003. The main square or garden of the town is located in front of the mission church. It is filled with trees, which are often filled with noisy birds. It is an important gathering place, especially on Sundays when vendors sell snacks and toys for children. In the early morning, taxis to share with other riders gather at the main square, with their drivers shouting various locations. On weekends, there are artistic presentations. Across Independencia Street is the Museum of the Sierra Gorda. The building was originally known as the Jalpan Fort, constructed in the 16th century by Juan Ramos de Lora and is one of the oldest in Jalpan. The site served as a military fort for centuries and then as a regional jail for about fifty years. In 1991, it became the museum. It contains seven halls that relate the evolution of the Sierra Gorda region from the pre historic period to the early 20th century. The collection includes old maps of the area, pre Hispanic artifacts, fossils, displays about the Spanish conquest and evangelization, with emphasis on the five Franciscan missions and Junípero Serra, artifacts from the Mexican Revolution and a room dedicated to the indigenous peoples of the Sierra Gorda.

Another building that faces the main square is the former Melchor Ocampo School, which was the first in the municipality. Today, it is the home of the municipal cultural center, which hosts exhibitions, and a number of government offices. The municipal post office is located on a side of the mission church, on a building that was part of the mission complex. During the Reform War, this building held General Mariano Escobedo prisoner.

There is a crafts center called the Casa de las artesanías. It exhibits and sells various crafts from Jalpan and surrounding municipalities such as those made of palm fronds, ceramics, pine needles and wood. It also includes food items such as fruit preserves, guava candies, fruit liquors, honey and regionally produced coffee.

Near the town are the ruins of the former Hacienda del Rayo.

One dish of the area is cecina serrana, which is dried beef marinated in sour orange and salt. Another is a “zacahuilt,” which is an extremely large tamale made with corn, various chili peppers and pork or chicken. It is wrapped in a banana leaf and cooked all night in an oven. River shrimp called acamayas are another specialty and are prepared in various forms. Revoltillo are eggs cooked on a comal with a sauce made from “coyol” which is similar to tomatoes. Atole is flavored with sunflower seeds, small guavas or piloncillo.

== Geography ==
=== Climate ===
Climate data for Jalpan de Serra, Querétaro (1981-2010), extremes (1966–present)
Month	Jan	Feb	Mar	Apr	May	Jun	Jul	Aug	Sep	Oct	Nov	Dec	Year
Record high °C (°F)	39.0 (102.2)	41.0 (105.8)	45.0 (113.0)	46.0 (114.8)	47.0 (116.6)	46.0 (114.8)	42.0 (107.6)	42.0 (107.6)	42.0 (107.6)	39.0 (102.2)	44.0 (111.2)	40.0 (104.0)	47.0 (116.6)
Mean daily maximum °C (°F)	27.2 (81.0)	29.8 (85.6)	33.2 (91.8)	35.7 (96.3)	37.2 (99.0)	34.8 (94.6)	32.7 (90.9)	33.2 (91.8)	32.0 (89.6)	30.2 (86.4)	29.2 (84.6)	26.6 (79.9)	31.8 (89.2)
Daily mean °C (°F)	18.5 (65.3)	20.6 (69.1)	23.5 (74.3)	26.3 (79.3)	28.0 (82.4)	27.0 (80.6)	25.6 (78.1)	25.7 (78.3)	24.9 (76.8)	23.1 (73.6)	21.2 (70.2)	18.6 (65.5)	23.6 (74.5)
Mean daily minimum °C (°F)	9.8 (49.6)	11.3 (52.3)	13.8 (56.8)	16.9 (62.4)	18.8 (65.8)	19.1 (66.4)	18.6 (65.5)	18.3 (64.9)	17.7 (63.9)	16.1 (61.0)	13.2 (55.8)	10.7 (51.3)	15.4 (59.7)
Record low °C (°F)	−2.0 (28.4)	−1.0 (30.2)	1.0 (33.8)	7.0 (44.6)	10.0 (50.0)	9.0 (48.2)	10.0 (50.0)	10.0 (50.0)	10.0 (50.0)	6.0 (42.8)	1.0 (33.8)	0.0 (32.0)	−2.0 (28.4)
Average precipitation mm (inches)	11.3 (0.44)	8.5 (0.33)	12.3 (0.48)	31.3 (1.23)	44.7 (1.76)	143.4 (5.65)	173.9 (6.85)	142.3 (5.60)	175.4 (6.91)	79.1 (3.11)	24.3 (0.96)	7.5 (0.30)	854.0 (33.62)
Average precipitation days (≥ 0.1 mm)	2.8	2.5	1.9	3.9	4.8	10.5	13.0	12.5	14.0	8.4	4.2	2.1	80.6
Source: Servicio Meteorológico Nacional (temperature, 1981-2010)

== Demographics ==
There is a small community of Huastecos in Valle Verde, which has ties to a similar community of Mapatz, just over the border in San Luis Potosí. Most of the Querétaro Sierra Gorda's population is Pame, concentrated in the municipality, especially in the community of Las Nuevas Flores, near Tancoyol, but also in San Juan de los Durán, El Pocito, Las Flores, San Antonio Tancolyol and El Rincón. The total number of Pame in Querétaro is small, at about 200 people, but it has been growing along with Pame communities in nearby San Luis Potosí. However, the Pames of Querétaro are more integrated with the general culture than their counterparts in San Luis Potosí. Only one Querétaro community maintains most of the old traditions, which is Las Nuevas Flores, with primary economic activities including agriculture, the raising of rabbits, goats and sheep and the production of crafts made from palm fronds. Many Pames have migrated out of the area into various parts of Mexico and some to the United States. Despite their small numbers, the group is considered to be important to the cultural identity of the municipality.

The municipality has been experiencing population loss since the middle of the 20th century, with many migrating out to the United States in search of better paying work. From 2000 to 2005, the population has gone from 22,839 to 22,025. Those who still remain in the municipal seat have moved from agriculture to industry or commerce. The only community which has had significant population growth, doubling over the last thirty years, mostly due to the main highway and work related to the Jalpan Dam.

== The mission churches ==
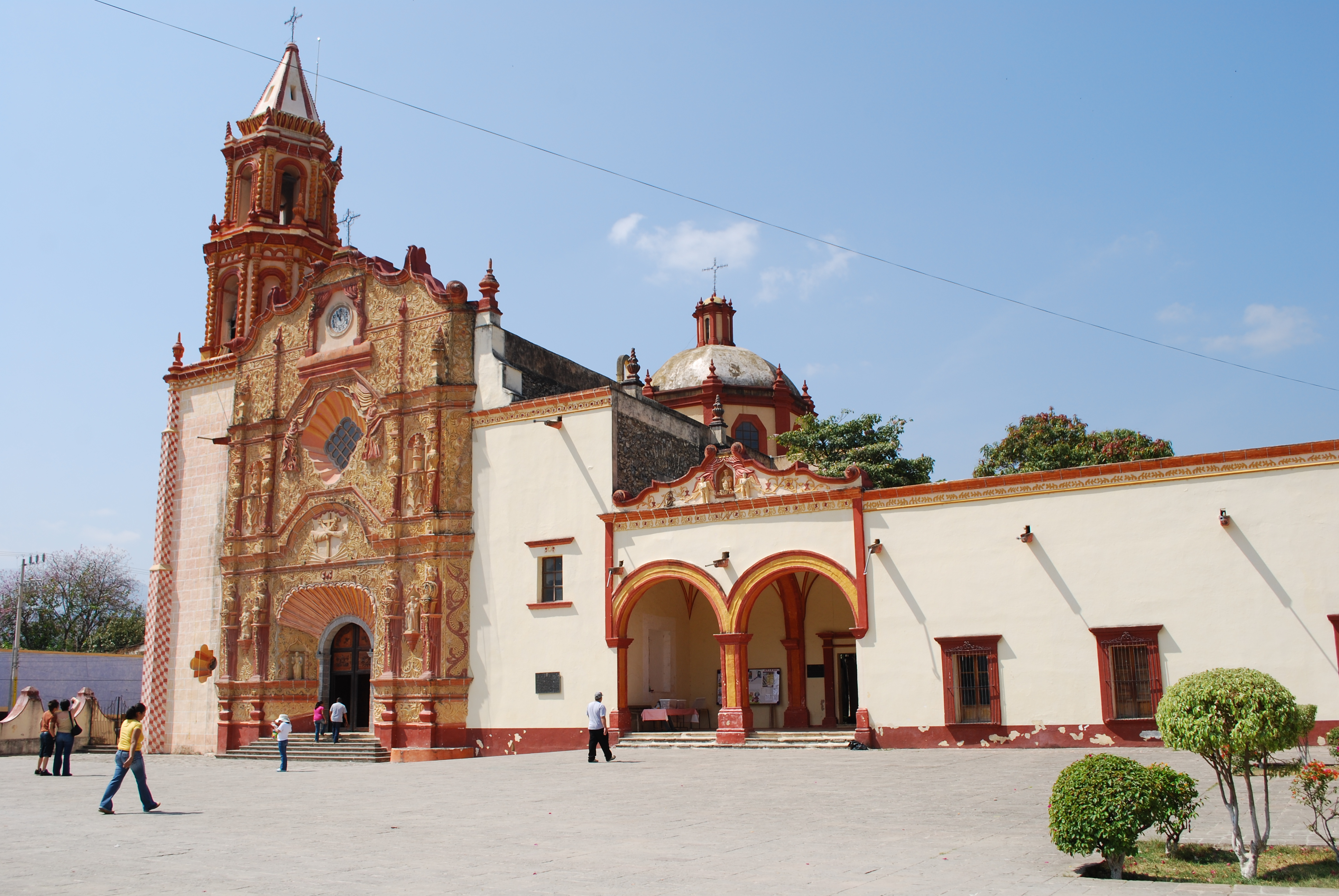
The mission in the town of Jalpan

The municipality has two of the five Franciscan missions accredited to Junípero Serra during his evangelization of the Sierra Gorda. These missions were declared a World Heritage Site in 2003. One is located in the town of Jalpan proper and the other is located in the community of Tancoyol. The mission in Jalpan was constructed between 1751 and 1758 and dedicated to Saint James the Greater, as defender of the faith. It was the first of five missions built to evangelize the area. The main portal is dominated by various forms of plants most local to the region. European elements include images of saints and the Franciscan coat of arms. Native elements include a double headed eagle with a snake as well as an image of the Virgin of Guadalupe.

The facade is elaborately done in stucco and stone work, with ochre of the pilasters contrasting with the yellow of many of the decorative details. Much of the detail is vegetative, along with small angels and eagles. On the lowest level of the facade, there are figures of Saint Dominic and Francis of Assisi. There is also a small coat of arms with five wounds and the coat of arms of the Franciscan order. Inside the door, there are the images of Saints Peter and Paul. There is also a double-headed Mexican eagle devouring a serpent. On the upper left, there is an image of the Virgin of Guadalupe on the upper left, the Our Lady of the Pillar. These are the virgin images of Mexico and Spain respectively. This statue is said to have been taken by a general at the end of the 19th century. It was replaced by a more modern clock. Inside, the cupola of the Jalpan mission contains scenes of the appearance of the Virgin of Guadalupe.

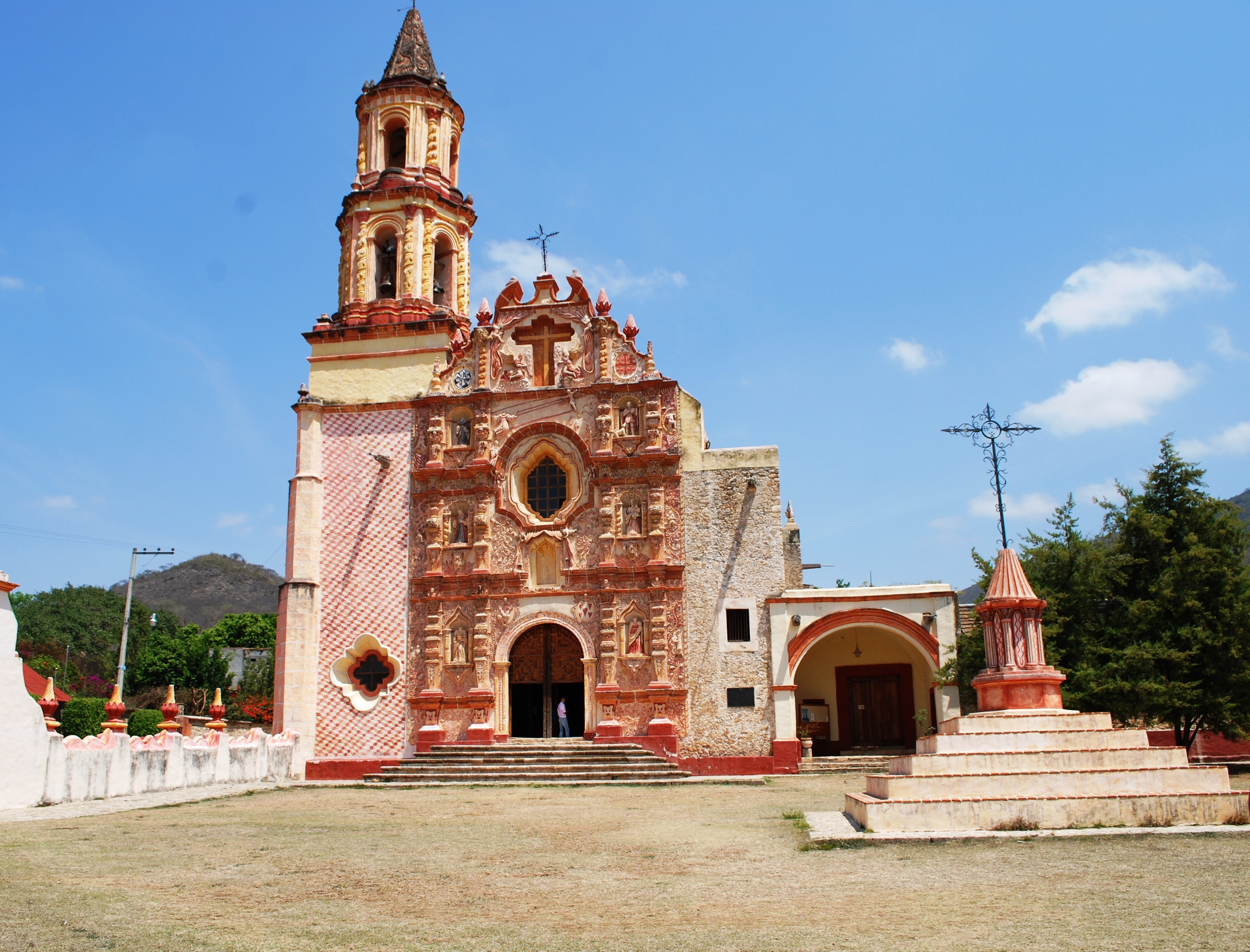
The mission in Tancoyol

The Tancoyol mission is dedicated to Our Lady of Light. It is thought to have been built by Friar Juan Ramos de Lora, who resided in the community between 1760 and 1767. The facade is marked by a rhomboid window surrounded by a representation of the cord Franciscans use to tie their habits. The basic theme of the facade is mercy, represented by interventions by the Virgin Mary and various saints. The iconography of this portal is the most elaborate of the five missions. European elements include images of saints such as Peter and Paul and the Franciscan coat of arms. The image of Our Lady of Light has disappeared from the facade, leaving only curtain-like decoration supported by angels and images of Saints Joachim and Anne, along with Saints Peter and Paul. Saint Roch appears to counter plagues. There is also a representation of the stigmata of Francis of Assisi. The main cross at the top represents redemption with the crosses of Calatrava and Jerusalem on either side. Indigenous elements are found in the church's interior, with an image of a jaguar and a person with Olmec features.

== Culture ==
The feast of the Santo Niño de la Mezclita is the most important in the municipality. This is an image of a child Jesus named after the Mezclita community. The image was brought to the community in 1890 by Antonio Velazques from Guanajuato and to it many miracles have been attributed. When it was donated, it was received by Father Roman Herrera, who began the annual festival in the Ayutla community. However, disputes over custody of the image forced the local bishop to take the image and give it to Jalpan later on. The festival attracts between 20,000 and 25,000 people from the various communities of the Sierra Gorda. Other religious events include an annual Passion Play during Holy Week, Day of the Holy Cross on May 3, Feast of James the Greater on 25 July and Day of the Dead. For the last event, there is a monumental altar to the dead erected on a small plaza in the town of Jalpan.

There are several important secular events as well. The Feria Regional Serrana takes place each year in April and includes various artistic, cultural and sports events, including a fishing tournament. The Convivio de la Amistad takes place on May 1 on the banks of the Jalpan River in an area known as the Playita (Little Beach). The event is a very large potluck where families share food they brought. This usually begins after May 1 Labor Day events. Earth Day (Fiesta de la Tierra) takes place in June, sponsored by the Grupo Ecológico Sierra Gorda. This event is principally for children to promote the importance of conservation efforts.

Huapango is the dominant traditional musical form, with two variations: huapango arribeño and huapango huasteco (son huasteco). The first is in process of disappearing because of migration of many rural residents and the urbanization of others. Huapango huasteco remains popular, especially in recent years with the emergence of youth trios dedicated to the music. It is most often played during traditional events such as religious feasts, Independence Day and the Christmas holidays.

Many have become dependent on remittances sent from the United States from relatives. Many who work in the US return at the end of the year for the Christmas holidays. These people are called “norteños” (northerners) and are celebrated on 28 December called “El Día del Paisano” (Day of the Countryman). The festival has a number of events including the coronation of the Paisano queen, a mass, a pickup truck parade decorated with symbols of the US and the Sierra Gorda area and a charreada event called El Jalpense. At night there is a dance with live music. The event attracts about 5,000 people per year and covered by television. Originally, the event was purely for Jalpan, but it has grown to include participants from surrounding municipalities. In 2010, over one hundred pick up trucks participated in the annual parade for Día del Paisano. Their owners raffled off 1,850 US dollars in cash. During the parade, the visiting “paisanos” show off their pickup trucks bought in the U.S. competing for the best and most luxurious.

== Economy and tourism ==
The most important natural resource of the area is the forests, with commercial species such as pines and oaks. About 15,441 hectares of the total municipal territory of 329,020 is used for agriculture and 9,872 are used for forestry. Just under 29% of the working population is dedicated to agriculture, livestock and forestry. Only 650 hectares of agricultural fields are irrigated, with the rest worked only during the rainy season. The Tancoyol area has the most important agricultural production with beans, corn, chickpeas, cardamom, tomatoes, chili peppers and watermelon. Livestock production is most important near the municipal seat, with cattle, pigs, sheep, goats and horses, along with domestic fowl. Another product form Rincon de Tancoyol is honey which considered some of the best produced in Mexico. It is commercialized under the name of “Miel Xi’Oi Teneek” and much is exported to Europe. Coffee is grown on certain mountainsides in the municipality and has a distinctive aroma.

About 17% to industry, mining and construction. Industry is mostly limited to handcrafts and food products in small family owned workshops. Ceramics are primarily produced in Soledad de Guadalupe by a cooperative of women. Their products include cups, plates, vases, glasses for tequila, jars for salsa, sugar and more. The pieces are molded by hand, fired than painted by hand as well. In Las Nuevas Flores, various Pame families make various crafts with palm frongs such as fruit baskets, flower vases, fans and more. These products are sold in outlets in Tancoyol and Jalpan as well as in the Museum of the Sierra Gorda. Leather items are mostly produced by the El Gavilán workshop in el Rincón de Tancoyol decorated with silver thread, stamped by other means. Articles include knife sheaths, carriers for cell phones, key chains, wallets, belts and more. The El Exilio Ranch is in the Acatitlan del Río community and makes a liquor and a sweet pate called ate from guava fruit. The fruit is grown locally and the products are made by the family that owns the ranch. A number of families in Tilaco produce coffee liquor and traditional pastries and cakes. A large percentage of women are officially classified as homemakers.

Commerce is the growing sector of the economy, with 193 registered businesses, five tianguis and two public markets. About 43% are employed in commerce and services, including tourism. Tourism has become the most important economic alternative for the municipality. The municipality received around 70,000 visitors in 2009, making it an important tourist attraction for the state. The number of visitors is expected to have increased for 2010 and continue to increase for 2011 for the Sierra Gorda given the interest in ecotourism. While the municipality attracts visitors from all age groups, the focus is on younger visitors, as these are more likely to be interested in ecotourism. The main ecotourist attractions include waterfalls, rivers and the Jalpan Dam. Most visitors come from Mexico City and the state of Querétaro. Jalpan de Serra became a Pueblo Mágico in 2010 for its “traditions, warmth, humility, historical valued and human quality.” The Secretary of Tourism for Mexico, Gloria Guevara Manzo, indicated that the municipality has great potential not only for its natural attractions, but for its cultural ones as well. The naming means that the community is eligible for federal assistance to improve the town's infrastructure, especially the burying of electric and other cables.

The Tancama archeological zone is located in the community of the same name, thirteen km from Jalpan. It is a site belonging to the Huasteca culture and dates from between 200 and 900 CE.

The community of Acatitlán del Río is six km from Jalpan de Serra and contains the “La Casita Ecológica” (The Little Ecological House). This is a cabin next to an arroyo among gardens and mango orchards. The area is best for observing butterflies, hiking and mountain biking. The cabin accommodates up to four people.

Valle Verde's environment is one of the best conserved parts of the municipality. The main crafts producer in the community is the Soledad de Guadalupe ceramics cooperative. There is also the ecological water park called the Ojo de Agua de San Juan de los Durán and the Cueva del Agua. These areas have cabins, camping, ecological education, bicycles and horses for rent and a pool filled with water from a local spring.

The large numbers of people who send money to the area and bring money with them during the Christmas holidays has “dollarized” the local economy. This currency is accepted in a number of businesses. It is estimated that about 18.2 million dollars each year comes into the area from the U.S.

== History ==
The name comes from Nahuatl and means “place over sand.” In 1976, the appendix “de Serra” was added to honor missionary Junípero Serra. The coat of arms for the city contains symbols of its history from its founding as a Franciscan mission in 1744 by Captain José de Escandón. There are four elements: “idolatry” represented by the goddess Cachúm in stone, the conquest and evangelism represented by a sword and crossed arms, the mixing of the two races represented by a double headed eagle eating a snake and the fourth represents the Jalpan and Tancoyol missions.

The first settlements in the area were founded between 1700 and 1000 C in the small valleys of the Sierra Gorda by people linked to Olmec areas. Afterwards, groups from the Teotihuacan, Toltec, Huasteca and Totonac cultures would settle in various parts as well. Jalpan is in the center of the Sierra Gorda, a region situated between the sedentary agricultural and mining cultures and the hunter-gatherer cultures to the north. The strongest cultural influences in the area during the Pre Classic period were Olmec, Teotihuacan and Huasteca, with major settlements to the south of the Jalpan area. Huasteca influence since that time has been strongest in the very north of Querétaro, where Jalpan is, although relatively few of the ethnicity have lived in the area. This is because of trade routes, especially along the Pánuco and Moctezuma Rivers. In the 1st millennium, Nahua tribes invaded the area, with artifacts such as “El adolecente Jalpanse” dated to between 600 and 1000 CE. However, many of these artifacts still show significant Huasteca influence.

By the late Post classic, the climate had dried to the point that much agriculture was no longer possible and many migrated out of the region. At the beginning of the 13th century, groups from the north, mostly Chichimecas: Pames, Jonaz and Ximpeces moved in en masse into the Sierra Gorda area, practicing hunting and gathering to sustain themselves. The Pames and Ximpeces also adapted gradually to village life and lived peacefully with neighboring cultures. Others, such as the Jonaz, never modified their warrior and hunter culture. They used the canyons and rough terrain of the area to launch attacks against more sedentary peoples nearby.

Around 1400, the Purépecha made incursions into the Sierra Gorda area after dominating the south of Querétaro somewhat, but never took control of the north. Tribes from the Sierra Gorda and north pushed the Purépecha south and west into the south of Guanajuato and to the Lerma River area. The Aztecs had better luck, nominally turning the Jalpan area into a tributary state under Moctezuma Ilhuicamina .

In 1527, Nuño de Guzmán conquered the Oxtipa dominion, to which Jalpan belonged. However, the Spanish did not take possession, due to the fierce opposition encountered, especially from the Chichimeca Jonaz. From then to the mid-18th century, there were various attempts to evangelize the Sierra Gorda area, including Jalpan by the Augustinians and Franciscans, but with little to no success. At the same time, there were military excursions, including the establishments of forts at Jalpan and in other places.

Pressure on the colonial government to take control of the area intensified as the need for secure links to Zacatecas and other mining areas as well as a buffer zone against the new French colony of Louisiana . José de Escandón was sent to pacify the area in 1740, which culminated in the defeat of the Jonaz at the Battle of Media Luna in 1749. This military action allowed for the permanent establishment of mission in the heart of the Sierra Gorda. In 1744, friar Pedro Pérez de Mezquía founded the Jalpan mission. It would be the first of five major missions of the area. The mission's founding was bolstered by the locating of 54 indigenous families to the area from the city of Querétaro. In 1750, Junípero Serra arrived to the Jalpan mission and worked with Francisco Palou to convert and teach new economic strategies to the indigenous peoples. Serra would be credited with the successful evangelization of the Sierra Gorda.

The mission is Mexican Baroque with significant indigenous influence. It was constructed over a span of seven years and functioned as a hospital, dining hall and training center as well as a mission. The mission allowed the early development of economic activities such as agriculture, livestock and mining to groups other than the Pames, especially in a location called El Saucillo. The conquest of the Sierra Gorda would be the start of the domination of what is now the north of Mexico and into what is now the southwest United States, as the colonial government saw the importance of the region for economic development as well as a military buffer zone against the French and English.

During the Mexican War of Independence, an insurgent group under Captain Elosúa formed, which was defeated by the royalist army in 1819, burning houses and storage facilities in the town, leaving it in ruins.

In 1880, the first highway leading to the area was built connecting Jalpan to the state capital. This spurred economic development. In 1904, the governor of Querétaro, Francisco González de Cosío, officially named Jalpan a city as it had telephone, telegraph and some electrical services as well as a sugar cane mill.

In 1910, a group called Club Aquiles Serdán was formed under Policarpo Olvera. Others, such as Coronel De la Peña, Conrado Hernandez and Malo Juvera fought against the Victoriano Huerta regime in 1913. There were also various military actions headed by Lucio Olvera between 1914 and 1924.

In the early 1930s, there was a political struggle between Rómulo Vega from Jalpan and General Porfirio Rubio de Agua Zarca for dominance in the region.

Between 1962 and 1970, a paved highway connecting Jalpan and the city of Querétaro was built. In addition a number of secondary roads, bridges, more electrical infrastructure and water services were constructed.

Between 1980 and 1985, the Jalpan mission, along with the four others underwent restoration. This work and more would eventually lead to the mission churches being declared a World Heritage Site in 2003, at a ceremony at the mission in Jalpan by local, state and UNESCO officials.

In 2003, the Universidad Autónoma de Querétaro inaugurated its Jalpan Campus. The Universidad Tecnológica de San Juan del Río opened a campus the same year. The city gained a second tier professional soccer team in 2004.

Since the mid-20th century, the municipality has been losing population due to lack of economic opportunities. So many have left the Sierra Gorda to work in the U.S. that schools have closed for the lack of students. This loss of students has been most noticeable at the primary school level.
