= Pame people =

Pame
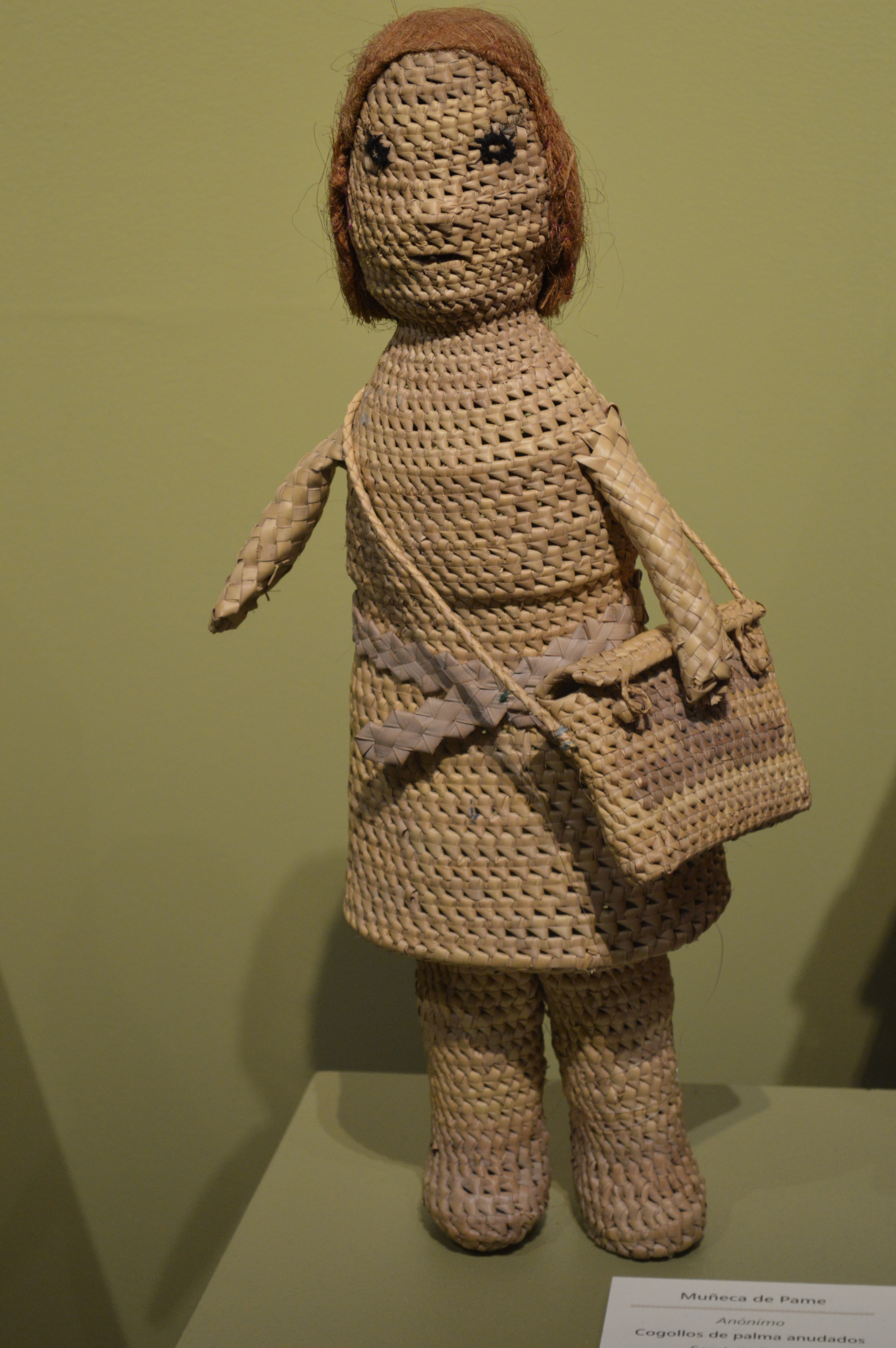
- "Pame Doll" by Anonymous, made of knotted plant fiber, located at the Museum of Popular Art in Mexico City.

Total population
- approximately 10,000

Regions with significant populations
- San Luis Potosí

Languages
- Pame, Mexican Spanish

Religion
- Pame religion, Roman Catholicism

Related ethnic groups
- Chichimeca Jonaz, Ximpece

The Pame are an Indigenous people of central Mexico primarily living in the state of San Luis Potosí. The northern Pame refer to themselves as the Xi'iuy (alternate spelling: Xi'úi, Xi'ui, Xi'oi, or Xiyui), while the southern Pame (in Hidalgo) call themselves Ñáhu or Nyaxu, and the Pame of Querétaro call themselves Re Nuye Eyyä. When Spanish colonists arrived and conquered their traditional territory in the sixteenth century, which "extended from the modern state of Tamaulipas in the north to Hidalgo and the area around Mexico City in the south along the Sierra Madre," they renamed "the area Pamería, and applied the name Pame to all of the peoples there."

Estimates for population of the Pames at the time of contact with Spanish colonists in 1519 range between 40,000 and 70,000. In 1794, the population was estimated at 25,000. Recent figures for the Pame have estimated the population to be approximately 10,000 people. The Pames, along with the Chichimeca-Jonaz of the Sierra Gorda in eastern Guanajuato, are the only two intact cultural groups "of all the peoples known collectively as Chichimecas" who have survived colonization.

== History ==
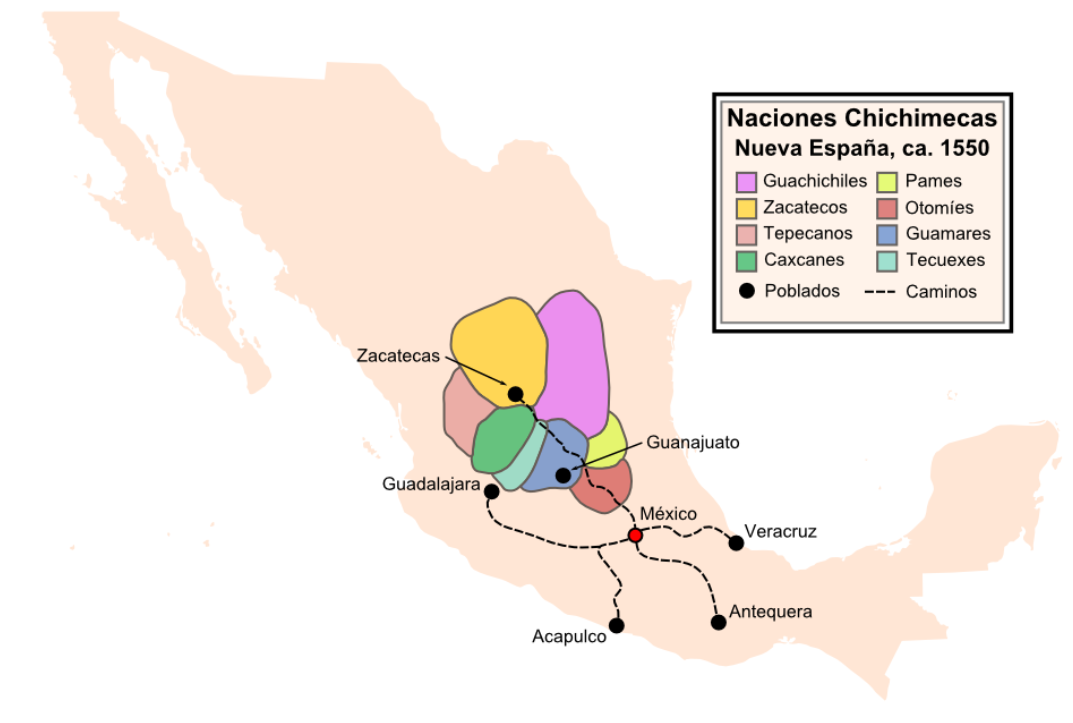
Map of the Pame and surrounding nations during the 16th century

=== Pre-colonization ===
Prior to colonization, the Pame were traditionally traders who established relationships "with and even speaking the dialects of many other Indigenous groups" in the region. As a nomadic population, they were also "known as skilled hunters and fierce warriors." The Pame were closely related with the Mesoamerican culture to the south, which "differed from other Chichimeca groups," as "some Pame rancherias lived intermingled with Nahua, Otomi, and Purépecha settled villages on the northern frontier of Mesoamerica and apparently were aware of Mesoamerican agricultural techniques."

=== Mission period and Spanish occupation ===
In 1522, the Pame "allied with neighboring allies to resist the Spanish, but they were defeated and forced to accept mission life, like most other indigenous peoples of Latin America." Under missionization, the Pame were "settled in and around the missions" which simultaneously led to Christianization and an end to their largely nomadic way of life as "the Pame were converted to Christianity and taught the skills of sedentary farming." The Pame lost territory in the Bajío in the 1530s to Otomi settlements and Spanish rancherias moving into the area. They reportedly played a minor role in the Chichimeca War with the Spanish, "limited to small raids on cattle ranches" in the Bajío, which caused minor casualties on either side. Cattle ranches had invaded much of the "more hospitable areas of [their] Rioverde [territory] after 1600."

In the early eighteenth century, Gerónimo de Labra, "a military man of the eighteenth century" who was assigned by the Spanish to be the "captain protector of the Indians of the Sierra Gorda," described the Ximpece, Pame, and Chichimeca Jonaz, described "the Ximpeces... of so docile nature that there is no tradition that persuades its conquest... the Pames are similar to the Ximpeces and more applied to the work and commerce with the Spanish and opposed to the Jonaces... the untameable rebellious Jonaces..." Pame territory in the more rugged Sierra Gorda remained relatively "unreduced" in comparison, "til a belated conquest, by soldiers and Franciscans, in 1742."

By the 1730s, Spanish military officer and slaveowner José de Escandón was "entrusted with 'pacification' of the region" in which the Pames lived. Escandón's methods of addressing them brought him "into conflict with the missionaries," as he carried out a "different method of colonization" in the region. As early as 1735, Escandón "undertook military campaigns against the Jonace and other Indians of the Sierra Gorda" for which he was awarded with the rank "colonel." In 1741, he was placed in control of the entire Sierra Gorda region. He used his newfound power to implement his plan "to gather into missions the Indians who were willing to be congregated and to attack and defeat those who were unwilling." Escandón was dissatisfied with the manner in which the Augustinian missionaries were allowing the Indigenous people freedom of movement. He wanted the "Indians" to become agricultural workers so that they could "be forced to work at the missions," which had come to be known as the "Texas Method" among colonizers because, in the fertile regions of Texas, "missionaries... had been able to congregate the indigenous people close to the mission."

Escandón removed the Augustinians from control over the mission and assigned control over it to the apostolic colleges (colegios apostólicos), specifically the Colegio de San Fernando, who he also tasked with establishing three more missions at Landa, Tancoyol, and Concá, which "he had identified as already populated by Pame settlements." Escandón then "forced the Pame living in these areas to congregate near the missions by occasionally sending soldiers out to burn as many indigenous dwellings as they could find in the mountains."

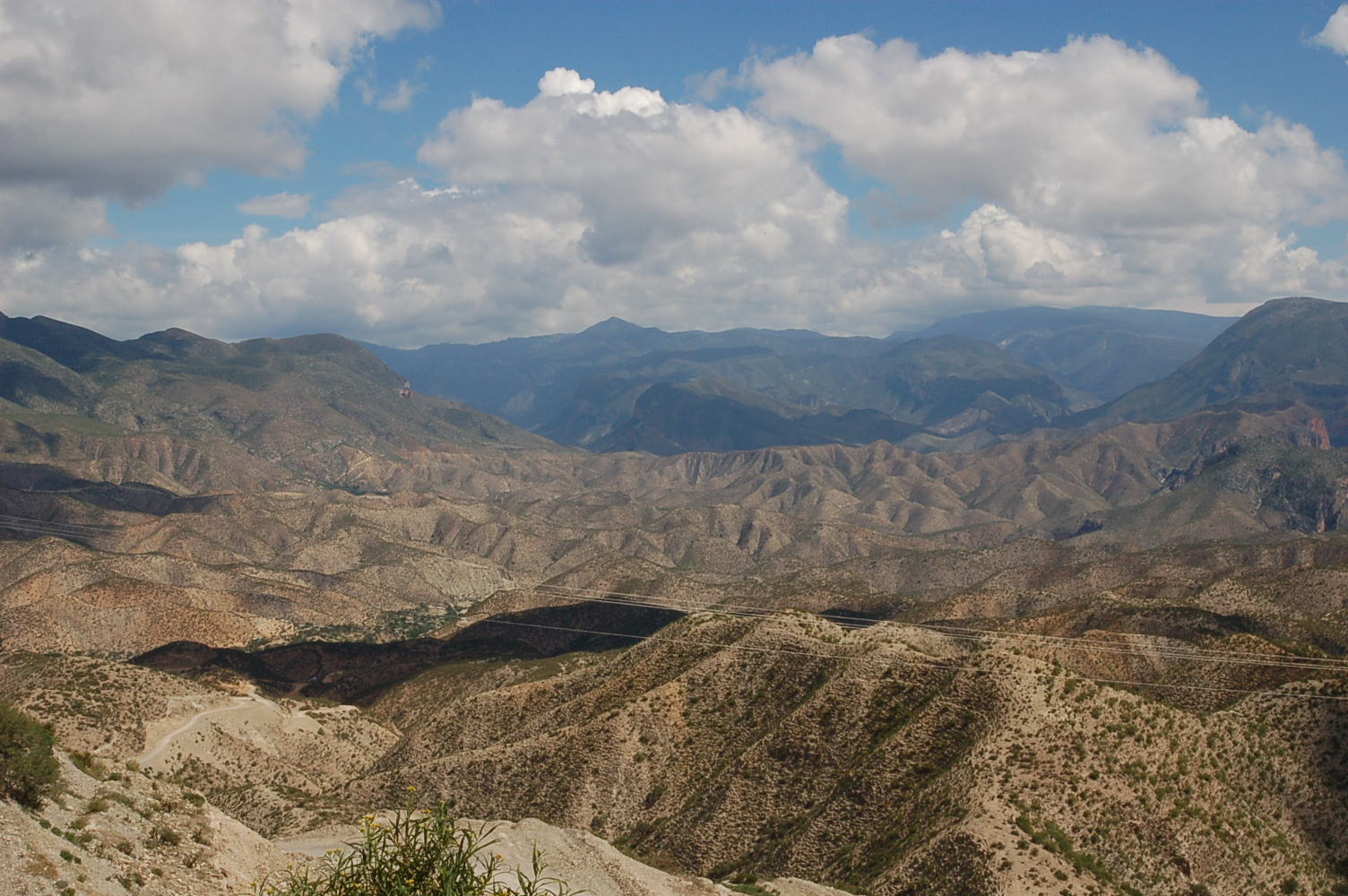
The Sierra Gorda region.

Although Escandón eventually left the Sierra Gorda, he was awarded the title Conde de Sierra Gorda in 1749 for "undertaking the colonizing task there and for his success in keeping costs down" and was presented with the "opportunity to colonize Nuevo Santander, the area south of Texas on the Gulf coast of New Spain." Before leaving the region, Escandón "forcibly uprooted some of the northern Pame and took them with him. Those who survived the brutal trek were forced to work on lands in the new colony."

In the mid-eighteenth century, Juniper Serra was "first assigned to the remote Sierra Gorda region in what is now south-central Mexico's Queretaro state" and "worked among" the Pame, before embarking on a "preaching mission across Mexico." In the 1760s, missionary Juan Guadalupe Soriano who had "gained the greatest knowledge of their knowledge," recorded: "The more one deals with them, the less one knows about them." Following what had now been decades of indoctrination attempts by missionaries and ongoing violence by Spanish military officers, Soriano confessed that "the Pame were still 'inclined to idolatry' and that virtually all of them still followed their own religious leaders and still practiced their traditional dances."

Francisco Palóu's account of the eighteenth century missionary period presents an image "in which the missionization of the Sierra Gorda was an unbridled success." Palóu claimed that "there remained not a single pagan in that entire district, for all its inhabitants were baptized by my Venerable Padre [Juniper Serra] and his associates, and civilized, living in towns by the sound of the bell." There was no mention of the "population decline of the Pame experienced as a result of the mission's process." There was also no mention of the "significant numbers of Pame people [who] resisted the Texas method and fled the five Fernandino establishments," not only to the surrounding hills but to "missions administered by other religious groups in the surrounding area where the Indians felt they would have more freedom."

During the 1760s, "settlers and groups of Pame continued to agitate for secularization," which would free the latter from the mission system. Finally, in 1770, "saying that it needed to devote all its available manpower to support the missions in the Californias," the colegio missionaries left the Sierra Gorda. Despite this, in 1770, the "Spanish declared that the conversion of the Pame was complete" and the missions were quickly secularized. The Pame "were left to defend for themselves" against Spanish settlers who were moving into the region and "had taken the best farmlands."

=== Mexican occupation ===
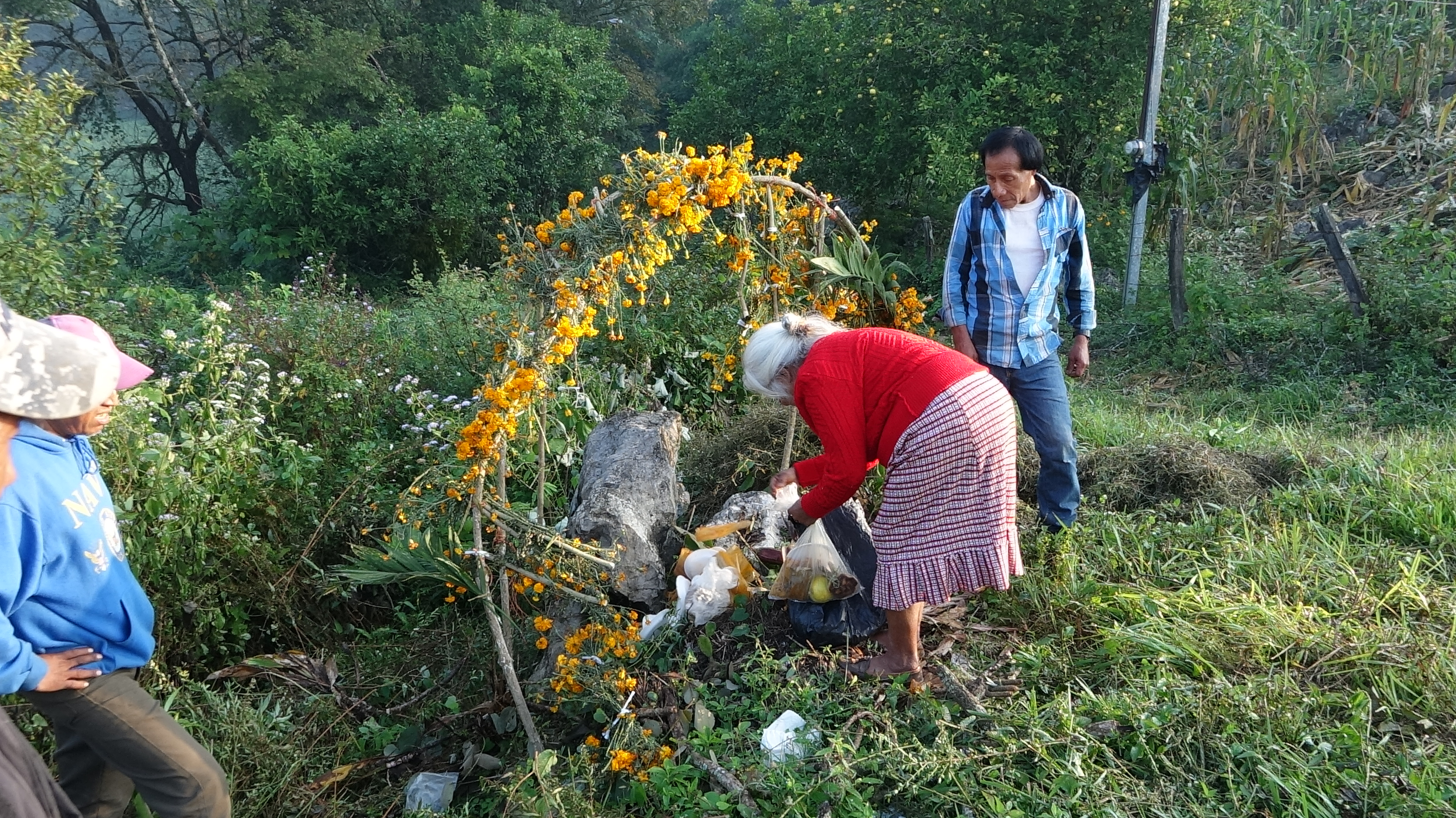
End of the feast of the dead. The portal is closed on the 1st. from December.

As a result, the Pame revolted in 1810 and 1848, and "they lost more of their land under the government land policy reforms of 1870, which favored landowners of European descent over the indigenous peoples." Eventually, a land reserve was an established for the Pame by the Mexican government along the Sierra Madre in the 1920s and 1930s. However, the "hilly and rocky terrain made it unsuitable for farming."

During the Mexican presidential campaign of Carlos Salinas, with regard to these difficult conditions of Pame life, and in company with representatives of the Nahua and Tének people, a representative of the Pame stated, "I want to tell you about the survival worries of our group. We are few and highly dispersed; we are no more than ten thousand, and each day we lose more of our language and our customs. The migration of our brothers, due to lack of water and bad soils, has meant a rapid advance in the loss of our culture and in our uprooting." The Pame representative asked that the lands which were established for them by the Mexican government in 1922 be returned to them and for a "water work" which had not been authorized by the government at the time.

Most of the Pame continue to live in poverty with "no agriculture or industry" in the region. The places of residence of many Pame are "cobbled together out of cardboard, plastic, sticks, and whatever other materials are available." Although schools are now being built in the region, it has been noted that "progress is slow." Many "rituals and religious festivals" are widely attended. Some Pame have "migrated to the United States to work as laborers in California, the Carolinas, Oregon, Texas, and Washington."

== Language ==
The Pame speak what are referred to as the Pame languages, which belong to the Oto-Pamean group of the Oto-Manguean language family. The Pame language has no written tradition.

Although it was claimed in Francisco Palóu's biography that Juniper Serra had "quickly learned the Pame language," despite his confession in letters from Alta California that "he had always had great difficulty in learning indigenous languages," this was unlikely if not entirely questionable. While it is "quite conceivable" that Serra had "composed a short treatise in which he translated some basic prayers into a simple and phonetic version of the Pame language" anything more elaborate is implausible, especially given the fact that the Pame language was "not widely studied in Mexico in the middle of the eighteenth century." The earliest Pame grammar was "composed by Juan Guadalupe Soriano" and dates from the 1760s, which was "well after Serra had left the Sierra Gorda."

Many of the Pame people today cannot read or write in Spanish.

== Culture ==
Among modern Pame beliefs include the existence of blood-sucking witches, ritual cleansings (limpias) that use an egg and prayers, certain rocks having spiritual powers, and a hierarchy of thunder divinities that coexist with the Catholic god. Healers/curanderos are called kade (plural kadet) and shamans are called kaju (plural kajut).
