= Janambre =

Indigenous people of northeast Mexico

The Janambre (Xanambre) were an indigenous people of Tamaulipas in northeast Mexico. They were the historical enemies of the Pison (Pisones).
