= Chichimeca Jonaz language =

Oto-Pamean language of central Mexico

Chichimeca Jonaz
- Chichimeco
- Úza’
- Native to: Mexico
- Region: Guanajuato
- Ethnicity: Chichimeca Jonaz
- Native speakers: 2,653 (2020)
- Language family: Oto-Manguean: Oto-Pame; Chichimeca Jonaz

Language codes
- ISO 639-3: pei
- Glottolog: chic1272
- ELP: Chichimeca-Jonaz

Chichimeca Jonaz or Chichimeco is an indigenous language of Mexico spoken by the Chichimeca Jonaz people in several communities within the municipality of San Luis de la Paz, notably in Misión de Chichimecas. It forms its own branch of the Oto-Pamean languages in the Oto-Manguean language family. Natively they call themselves éza’r [ézã́Ɂãr] and their language úza’ (also appears as uzá’ or úzá’ ) [ʔúzãʔ]. The 2020 census recorded 2,354 total speakers in Mexico while the Secretariat of Economy recorded 2,653 speakers in San Luis de la Paz.

== Name ==
The language is called "Chichimeca" or "Chichimeco" interchangeably, as is the form that uses a dash (Chichimeca-Jonaz). Natives call themselves chichimeco, chichimeca or meco. The use of "Jonaz" or "jonaces" appears in the sixteenth century as a means to differentiate several nomadic and semi-nomadic groups in northern Mexico called Chichimecas which included the Jonaces, Guachichiles, Mascorros, Guamares, Samúes, Janambres, Pisambres, Copuces.

== Distribution ==
The language is spoken in the following towns and communities in the municipality of San Luis de la Paz, Guanajuato: Berlín, Buenavista (El Cuernito), Cerro Blanco, Colonia Benito Juárez [Plan Benito Juárez], Ejido Santa Ana y Lobos (Fracción de Lourdes), El Desmonte, El Sauz Tres, El Tepetate, Exhacienda de Ortega (Ejido Ortega), Garibaldi (El Cerrito), La Ciénega, La Curva, La Huerta, La Laguna (La Lagunita), La Leona, La Mesa de Jesús, La Norita, Los Dolores (Las Quince Letras), Lourdes (Estación de Lourdes), Maguey Blanco, Manzanares, Mesa de Escalante, Mesa de la Estacada, Mesa del Pueblo, Misión de Chichimecas, Norita del Refugio, Parajes, Paso Colorado, Piedras de Lumbre, Pozo Hondo (Exhacienda de Pozo Hondo), Puerto de la Virginita, Puerto del Gato, Rancho Nuevo de las Trojes, San Antonio Chiquito, San Antonio Primero, San Ignacio, San Isidro de Pozos (San Isidrito), San José del Carmen, and San Pedro de los Pozos (Mineral de Pozos).

In 1934, Jacques Soustelle counted 452 chichimecas, 63 of whom were children who attended the local school. Prior to that point the language was spoken in five other locations:

1. Misión Arnedo (Guanajuato) to the east of San Luis, near Villa Victoria.
2. Misión de las Palmas (Querétaro), along the Etorax river, which arises near Victoria.
3. Misión de Santa Rosa, to the north of Victoria.
4. San Pedro Tolimán, where a mission was established in the 18th century, which failed, however, and the chichimecas abandoned the area. It was later repopulated with Otomís.
5. Villa Colón (Querétaro), to the south of Tolimán.

== Orthography ==
Chichimeca Jonaz uses an alphabet with 36 consonants, 6 vowels and 6 nasal vowels:

a a b ch cch ch' d ɇ ɇ e e g gw h i i j k kh l m mh m' n nh n' ñ o p ph p' r rh r' s t th t' ts tsh ts' u u w z ’

All vowels can occur nasalized which are written underlined with a, u, and i being the most frequent.

The letter ɇ represents /æ/.

The vowel i used to represent two sounds, /i/ and /y/. Younger speakers have merged both sounds into /i/ while /y/ has become restricted to the speech of older speakers.

There are also "rearticulated vowels" which are written with a saltillo in between two of the same vowels (ex. a'a, e'e, etc).

The saltillo or glottal stop can appear in a few different ways: officially, as a single quotation mark ⟨’⟩, as a simple apostrophe ⟨'⟩, or as the saltillo consonant ⟨Ꞌ⟩.

The saltillo in combinations with letters like ch' or m' indicate that the sound undergoes glottalization.

The letter h represents /h/ but also indicates an aspirated consonant.

The letter j represents /x/, and may or may not be phonemic.

The letter r represents /ɾ/, but it becomes /r/ when glottalized. There's also a nasal variant /ɾ̃/ that's written as just ⟨r⟩.

The letter w represents /w/, but can also be /ʋ/ in certain positions.

The digraphs kw and gw are written k and j at the end of some words (ex. én'uhj "you see", én'uhk "take care").

=== Tone ===
Chichimeca Jonaz is a tonal language with a high and low tone. The low tone is not marked, while the high tone is marked with an acute accent. Older publications describing Chichimeca Jonaz only marked the high tone if words were spelt the same or for grammatical reasons.

== Phonology ==
=== Tone ===
Chichimeca Jonaz is a tonal language with a high and low level tone.

=== Vowels ===
Vowels
	Front		Central	Back
Close	i	y		u
Mid	e			o
Open	æ		a	

- In addition, Chichimeca Jonaz has nasal counterparts of these vowels, which are /ĩ ỹ ũ ẽ õ æ̃ ã/.

=== Consonants ===
		Labial	Alveolar		Palatal	Velar		Glottal
		Labial	plain	sib.	Palatal	plain	lab.	Glottal
Nasal	fortis	m	n					
Nasal	lenis	mː	nː					
Plosive/ Affricate	plain	p	t	t͡s	t͡ʃ	k	kʷ	ʔ
Plosive/ Affricate	aspirated	pʰ	tʰ	t͡sʰ		kʰ	kʷʰ	
Plosive/ Affricate	ejective	pʼ	tʼ	t͡sʼ	t͡ʃʼ	kʼ		
Fricative	voiceless			s				h
Fricative	voiced	β		z		ɣ	ɣʷ	
Fricative	nasal	β̃						
Rhotic	trill		r					
Rhotic	tap		ɾ					
Rhotic	nasal		ɾ̃					
Approximant			l				w	

/β, ɾ/ become voiced stops [b, d] when after a nasal consonant.

== Sample Text ==
Article 1 of the Universal Declaration of Human Rights:

Chichimeca translation: Úr’u rinhí 1: Na’i urir ndi pu imhe, sa k’a bi’e nehe mahar kimba raro go’ ki nehe nato, urir kimba’ ragasb ki uri iri’ na’i pa be kibi’ e kimba’ rakhasb kabe’ ndi ur’u rinhi ndi egi’ i’e eteh egis ne’e.

English translation: Article 1: All human beings are born free and equal in dignity and rights. They are endowed with reason and conscience and should act towards one another in a spirit of brotherhood.
