= Ximpece =

Indigenous ethnic group of Chichimecas in Mexico

Total population
- Unknown

Regions with significant populations
- Querétaro

Related ethnic groups
- Chichimeca Jonaz, Pame

The Ximpece are an Indigenous people of Mexico who were a semi-nomadic ethnic group of Chichimecas who lived among the Pame and the Jonaz. The National Commission for the Development of Indigenous Peoples reported that "about 60,000 Amerindians live in the state of Querétaro, belonging to the Otomi, Chichimeca, Pame, Jonace and Ximpece peoples."

== History ==
Any sources which "provide descriptions about the way of life of the natives of the Sierra Gorda for the sixteenth and seventeenth centuries are very scarce." One of the most important sources on the Ximpece is by "a military man of the eighteenth century" Gerónimo de Labra. Designated as the "captain protector of the Indians of the Sierra Gorda," Labra's "Manifest of the precedent in the conquest, pacification and reduction of the chichimecos jonaces Indians of the Sierra Gorda" described the Ximpece, Pame, and Chichimeca Jonaz as follows: "The Ximpeces... of so docile nature that there is no tradition that persuades its conquest... the Pames are similar to the Ximpeces and more applied to the work and commerce with the Spanish and opposed to the Jonaces... the untameable rebellious Jonaces..."

The Ximpece inhabited the Sierra Gorda up until the nineteenth century. They were known for their fierce distrust of the Spanish and "entered the [Mexican] Independence period with substantial confidence and solidarity" with the other Indigenous groups who lived in the Sierra Gorda, namely the Pame and Jonaz. As "merchants, miners, and hacendados," who were "lured to the region by commercial investments" increasingly encroached upon the remaining territory they had managed to hold onto after centuries of colonization, an internal conflict among these groups "escalated into a race war."

In August 1847, Francisco Chaire "deserted his Guanajuato army post and returned to his Sierran village of Xichú." As a result, he was arrested by the mayor, who disliked the Chaire family. However, Francisco was freed shortly after by his brother, and assisted by Eleuterio Quirós, a family servant. The mayor "called in the army to track down the escapee and his accomplices." The Chaire family surrendered and were pardoned. However, Quirós was determined to continue resisting, the reasons for which are unclear. Quirós had soon "ignited a caste war" and quickly gained support among the poor in the region by promising "no more government interference in Sierran affairs," as well as land distribution, guaranteed employment, and "the termination of Church intrusions." The rebellion was "brushed off" as "socialist," which was "used as a catchword by outsiders to characterize Indian anger and unity." However, the white population and "even many mestizos" quickly became deeply worried "about the possibility of a combined effort by the Indians to expel them from the country."

Quirós' rebels "ravaged the Sierra well into 1849." Many whites were driven from the region in the period, while others fled. Army battalions were called in and ordered by General Anastasio Bustamante, "but it took a native son of the Sierra, General Tomás Mejía to track down Quirós and in December 1849 to certify his execution." Although further solutions ranged from complete extermination to land distribution, a compromise was eventually reached, which guaranteed the Indigenous people "some land to farm, considerable tax relief, and a promise that they would not be force-drafted into the army." Additionally, "the federal government founded three colonies for the Indians and gave them provisions and cattle for subsistence there."

However, shortly after the French invaded Mexico, which drew the situation of the Ximpece and other Indigenous people in the region into complete disarray. General Mejía "won the support of the Indians for the monarchists," yet was executed along with emperor Maximilion I after the eventual retreat of the French, their defeat, and the consolidation of the military forces of the Mexican Republic. This left the Indigenous people in the Sierra Gorda entirely vulnerable, who "were enveloped, although not completely pacified, by the national economic development that followed."
