= Chichimeca Jonaz people =

Group of Indigenous people living in Guanajuato and San Luis Potosí

Chichimeca Jonaz Úza
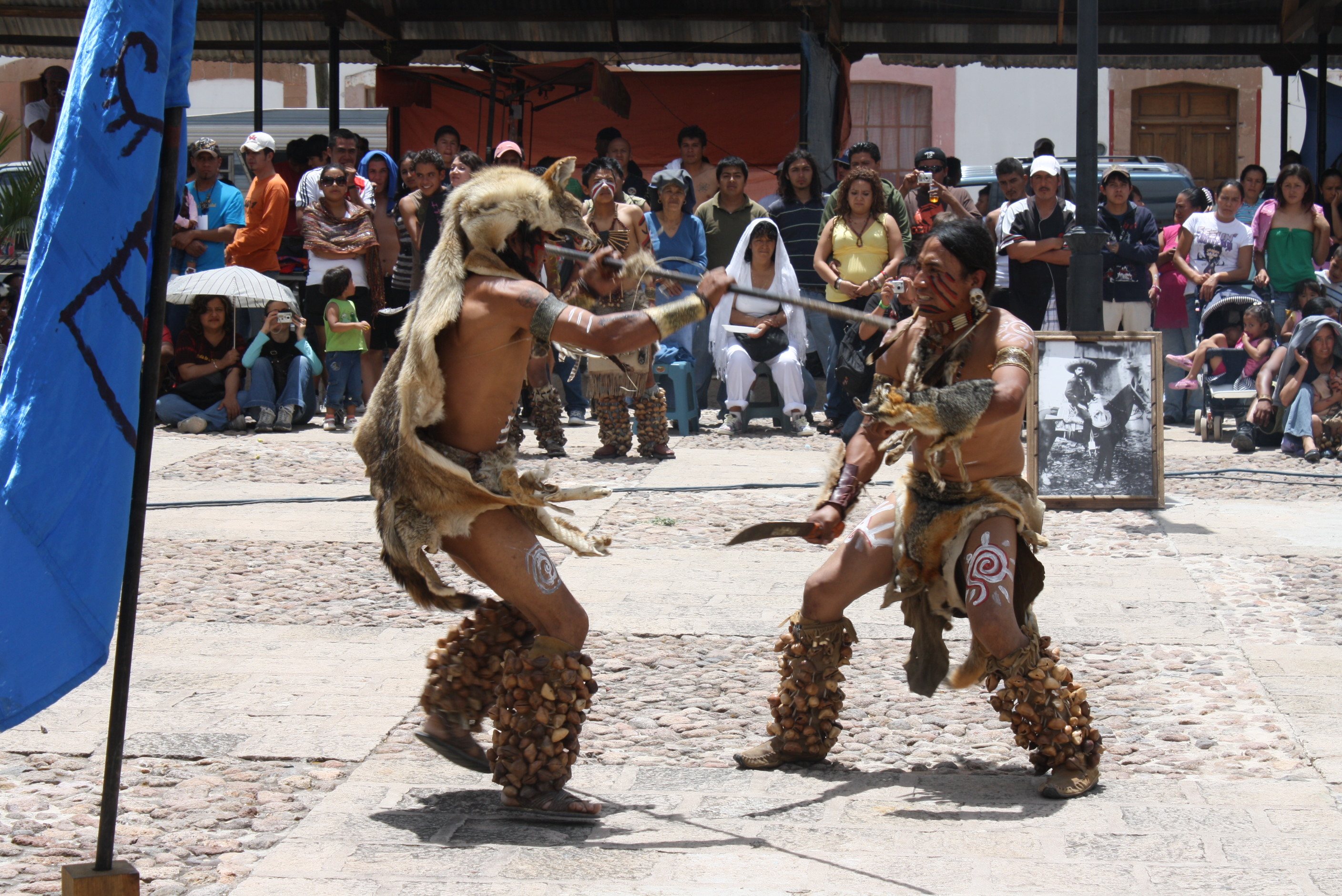
- Members of the Chichimeca Jonaz tribe perform ritual dance

Total population
- Mexico: 83,673

Regions with significant populations
- Mexico (Guanajuato and San Luis Potosí)

Languages
- Chichimeca Jonaz, Spanish

Religion
- Roman Catholic, Shamanism

Related ethnic groups
- Pame, Ximpece

The Chichimeca Jonaz are an Indigenous people of Mexico, living in the states of Guanajuato and San Luis Potosí. In Guanajuato, the Chichimeca Jonaz people live in a community in San Luis de la Paz municipality. The settlement is 2,070 m above sea level. They call this place Rancho Úza or Misión Chichimeca. They are descendants of the Pame people, who fought in the Chichimeca War (1550–1590) in the Chichimeca Confederation.

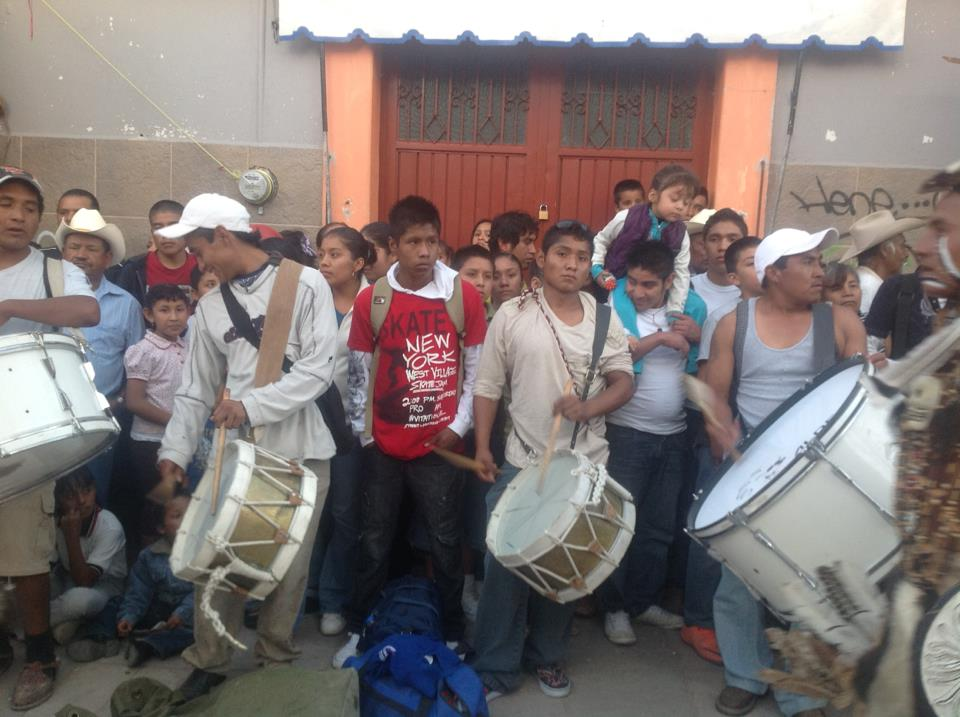
Chichimeca Jonaz at San Luis de la Paz.

In the 2000 General Census by INEGI 1,641 people named themselves as speakers of the Chichimeca Jonaz language. Of these 1,433 speakers lived in Guanajuato, and the other 115 in San Luis Potosí.

Their language belongs to the Pamean sub-branch of the Oto-Pamean branch of the Oto-Manguean language family, the closest relative of the Chichimeca Jonaz language is the Pame language.

== Spanish colonization of the Americas ==
During the ensuing Spanish colonization of the Americas, the Chichimecas Jonaz descendants, whom are the Pame nation, joined the Chichimeca Confederation to fight against the Spanish Empire in the Chichimeca War. The Chichimeca Confederation defeated the Spanish Empire in this forty-year war.

== See also ==
- Chichimeca
  - Spanish missions in the Sonoran Desert
  - Eusebio Kino
