= Arroyo Seco Municipality =

Arroyo Seco
- Municipality
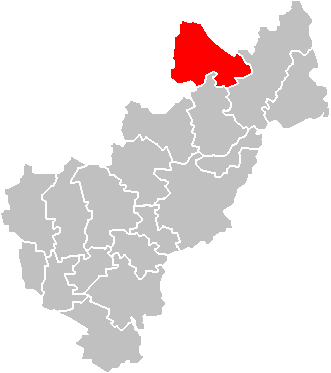
- Location of the municipality in Querétaro
- Coordinates: 21.5472°N 99.6883°W
- Country: Mexico
- State: Querétaro
- Municipal seat: Arroyo Seco
- Time zone: UTC-6 (Central)

Arroyo Seco is a municipality in the central Mexican state of Querétaro.

== The municipality ==
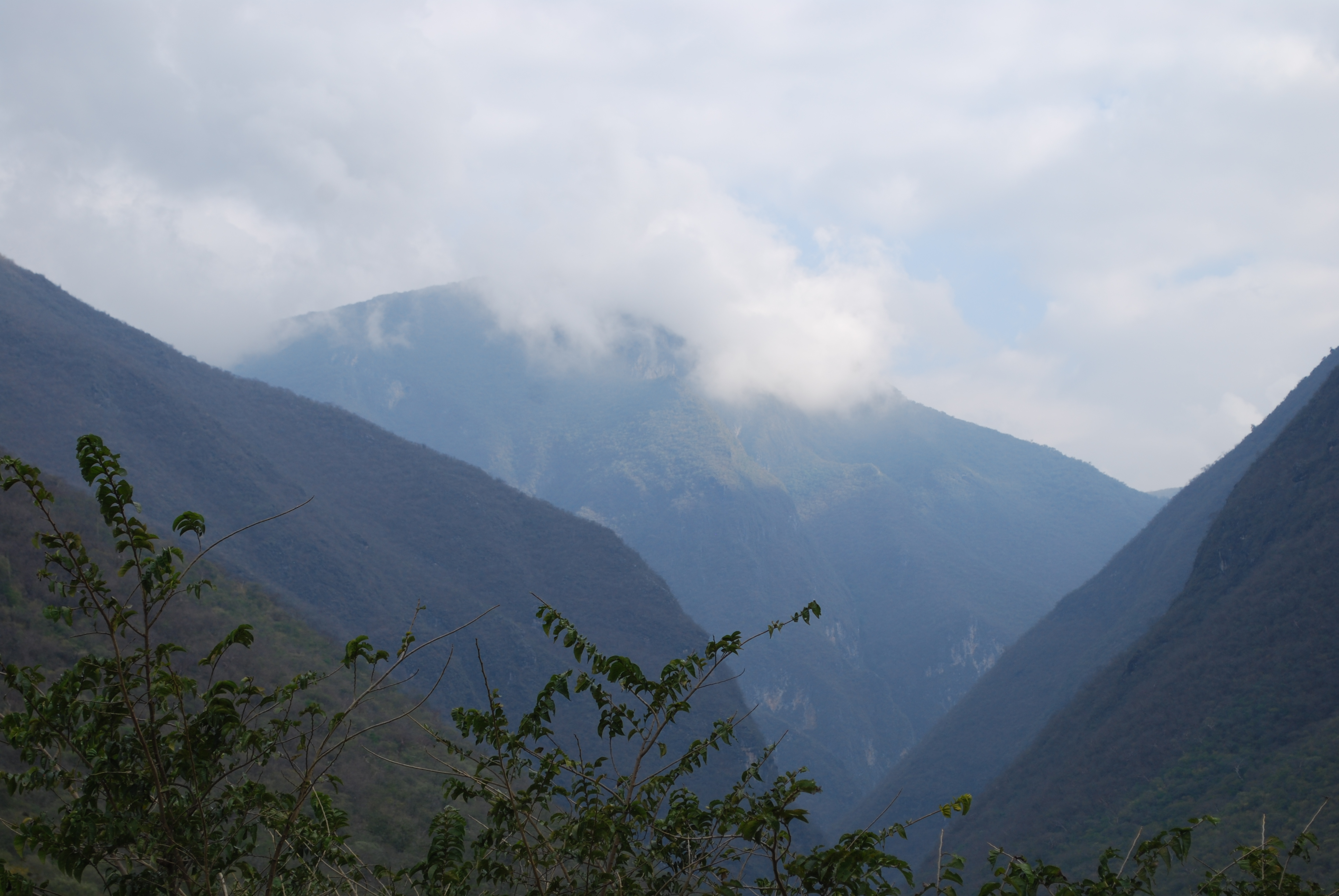
Mountains in Arroyo Seco Municipality

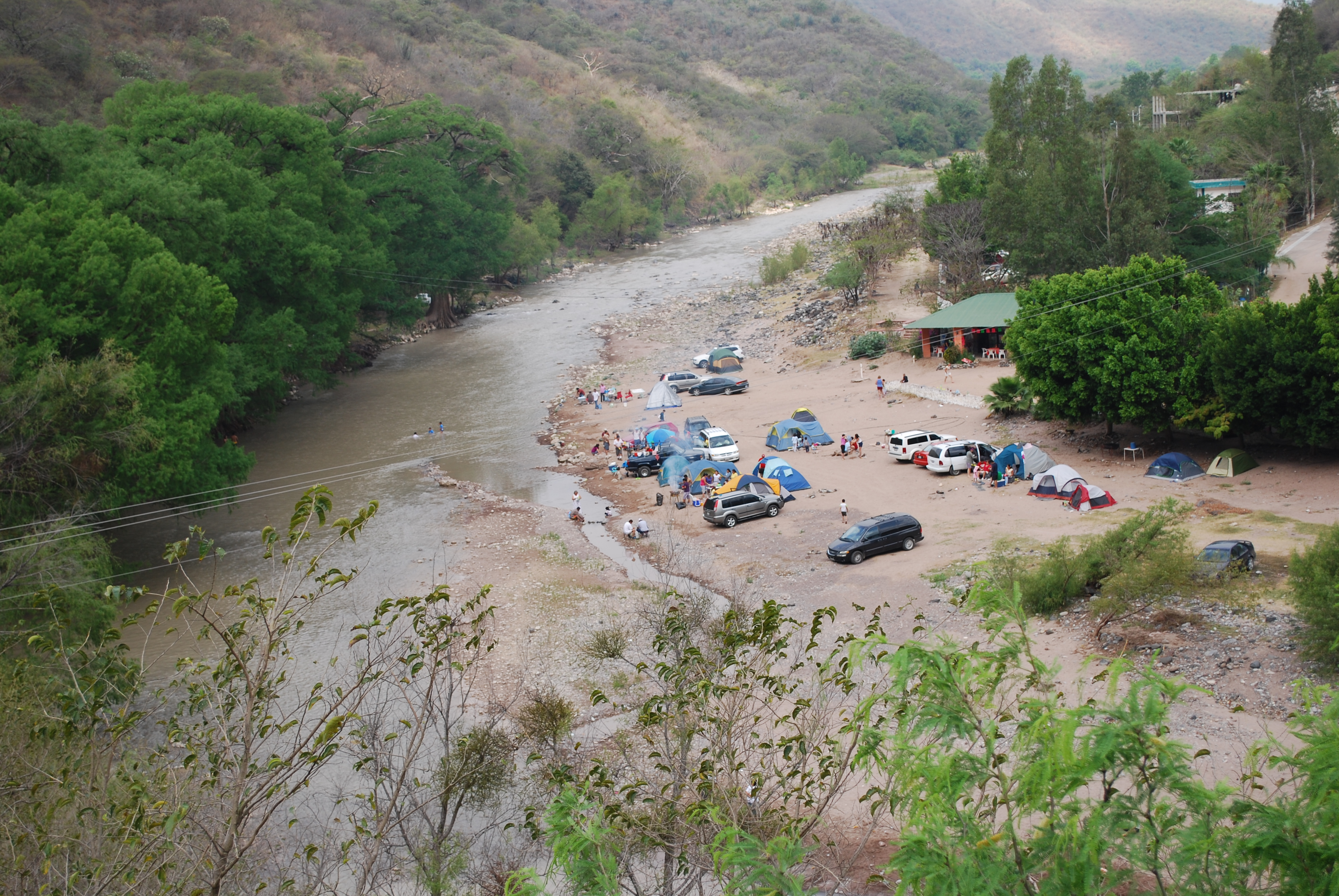
Camping by the Ayutla River

As municipal seat, the town of Arroyo Seco, Querétaro, is the local government for forty five communities, which together make up an area of 731.1665 km^{2}. The municipality is located in the north of Querétaro, the farthest from the state capital 238 km away. The municipality borders the municipalities of Jalpan de Serra and Pinal de Amoles with the San Luis Potosí to the north and west and the state of Guanajuato to the south and west. The municipality consists of forty five communities divided into the municipal seat, five delegations and forty sub delegations. It has a government consisting of a municipal president and nine officials called "regidors". In 2009, the municipality sponsored the first Guadalupana Race, with prizes for competitors in five different categories. The event attracts runners from various parts of the Sierra Gorda and neighboring states.

As of 2005, there were just over three thousand housing units in the municipality. Most are privately owned and built with materials found in the region such as adobe, bamboo, wood and tiles for roofs. Floors are either of cement or packed earth. Only 72% of the population has running water, most of which is in individual storage systems operated by gravity. Thirty communities have electrical service. There is both landline and cellular phone service and post offices in several locations.

There are thirty nine preschool programs and forty four primary schools. There are seven middle schools, four of which are distance education and three are technical. In Concá, there is a distance learning vocational high school, which belongs to the Sistema Colegio de Bachilleres del Estado de Querétaro. A new similar facility has been recently built in Purísima de Arista. Over 75% of the municipality's population only completes primary school, with just over 18% finishing middle school. In 2010, the Instituto Tecnológico de Querétaro (ITQ) opened a small unit in the municipality to provide higher education classes both face-to-face and via distance education. Classes include those in computer and industrial systems as well as certain types of high school level classes. The classes are giving at the Casa de Cultura in rooms which have been adapted for the purpose.

The main highway in the municipality is Federal Highway 69. A state highway connecting Jalpan with San Luis Potosí was built through here in 2000. In 2004, a highway to Guanajuato was added. These are supplemented by a number of rural roads connecting the various communities. Many of these roads have public bus service, including service to neighboring states.

Aside from the municipal seat there are a number of other important communities. Purísima de Arista is the second largest community in the municipality, which also has all utilities along with schools, health center and sporting facilities. Its economy is based on agriculture growing corn, beans, chili peppers, tomatoes, chickpeas and squash. It is located 36 km from the municipal seat. The town has a parish church was built in 1909. The Virgin of the Immaculate Conception is honored in Purísima de Arista on 8 December. Río de Carrizal is a small community located at an altitude of 600 masl, so it has a warm, subtropical climate. To arrive, one must cross as 205 meter bridge which is seven meters above the ground over the Santa María River. The community is wedged between two large mountains and consists of houses, small shops, gardens and a few fields. San Juan Buenaventura is located 48 km from the municipal seat and at an altitude of 1600 masl. The town is divided into the communities of El Bosque, San José de las Flores, El Quirino, La Mohonera and Laguna de la Cruz. Most of its economy is based on livestock.

The Concá delegation has the largest number of communities and is located 15 km from the municipal seat in the most agriculturally productive area of the municipality. Its agriculture along with tourism from the mission church has made it one of the most important communities in the region. The town of Concá is noted for its commemoration of Day of the Dead. The community of El Refugio was known as El Sótano until the early 20th century. Its origins date back to the beginning of the 18th century. Today, it is one of the main livestock (mostly smaller animals like goats and domestic fowl) in the municipality, which has been growing. It has one of the municipality's parish churches called Nuestra Señora del Refugio. It also has its own schools from pre school to middle school via distance education.

== Demographics ==
The municipality is part of the traditional territory of the Pame people, which extends over northern Querétaro and southern San Luis Potosí. In Querétaro, they are found in Jalpan de Serra and Arroyo Seco, especially San José de las Flores, El Rincón and El Rincón. Among themselves, they organize into groups called “desisorias” which are tightly knit communities which interact with other similar units for public services such as education and health. As of 2005, the census counted only sixty six people who spoke an indigenous language, Pame and Otomi. However, only a third of all Pames speak the language with over half being monolingual in Spanish. Disease in the colonial period and displacement, sometimes forced expulsion of Pame peoples nearly extinguished the ethnicity in Arroyo Seco, but since the early 20th century, there has been some migration of Pame back into the area. Pames generally live in homes made of palm, adobe and wood which can measure from 300 to 1000m2, rectangular with pitched roofs. The inside is generally a single room which includes a kitchen and places to sleep. Most Pame raise small livestock such as pigs and domestic fowl for sale or self consumption. Land is held by communities in common with certain authorities to regulate its use in places such as San José de las Flores, and El Rincón. Common handcrafts include items made from palm fronds such as mats and pottery, including comals and other cooking utensils. They also fashion wood into furniture and masks for sale or their own use. A number of these communities have received official recognition from the municipality as “Pueblos Indígenas” (Indigenous Villages). This allows the communities to petition for funds from the Comisión Nacional para el Desarrollo de los Pueblos Indígenas (CDI). The communities are Tierras Prietas, El Sabinito, Crucero del Sabinito, Las Trancas, La Cantera, El Riachuelo, San José de las Flores and San Juan Buenaventura.

The overwhelming majority of the population is Catholic, with four parish churches and the Concá mission church. The last church is directly administered by the Diocese of Querétaro. However, overall, the tendency of the population is negative. The population declined from 12,667 in 2000 to 12,493 in 2005. Arroyo Seco is the least populated in the Sierra Gorda region. Most of its communities have a population of between one and ninety nine inhabitants. The main for the decline is the emigration of much of its population due to poverty.
