= Arroyo Seco, Querétaro =

- Town
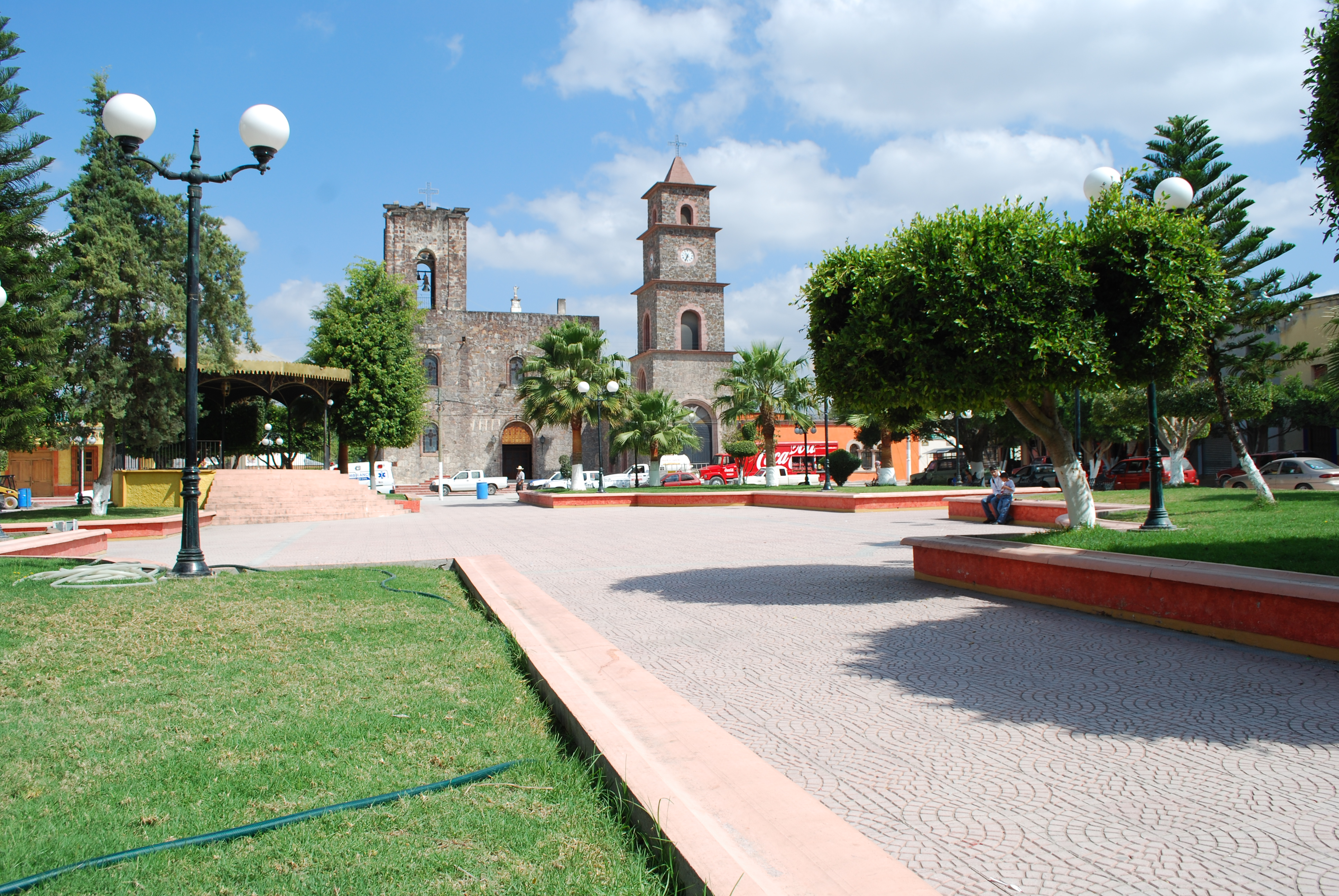
- Plaza and main church in municipal seat

- Location in Mexico Arroyo Seco, Querétaro (Mexico)
- Coordinates: 21°32′50″N 99°41′18″W
- Country: Mexico
- State: Querétaro
- Founded: 1833
- Municipal Status: 1933

Government

Area
  - Total: 731.1665 km^{2} (282.3050 sq mi)
- Elevation (of seat): 960 m (3,150 ft)

Population (2005) Municipality
  - Total: 12,493
  - Seat: 1,303
- Time zone: UTC-6 (Central (US Central))
- Postal code (of seat): 76440
- Website: www.arroyoseco.gob.mx (in Spanish)

Arroyo Seco is a town in Arroyo Seco Municipality located in the far north of the Mexican state of Querétaro. Its territory is part of the Sierra Gorda Biosphere Reserve of Querétaro. The municipality is centered on the small town of Arroyo Seco, which was established as a military outpost then given town status in 1833 under the name of Villa de Guadalupe before changing to its current name. The town gained municipal status in 1931. The area is very rural with most people living in communities of under 100 people, with significant Pame communities. It has a traditional economy based on agriculture, livestock and forestry but it is also one of the poorest in Mexico, with high rates of emigration, especially sending migrant workers to the United States. It is estimated that one in four households in the municipality receives money from family members in this country. The municipality is also home to one of five Franciscan mission complexes built under the tenure of Junípero Serra, located in the community of Concá.

== The town ==
Arroyo Seco is a small town of about three hundred homes centered on a plaza named after Mariano Escobedo. The town originated as a military outpost called the Presido de Arroyo Seco. It became the seat of the municipality of the same name in 1931.

The houses are painted in various colors and its streets are quiet. The town is home to all municipal services and has the most developed infrastructure and social services in the area. This includes the Casa de Cultura cultural center, an auditorium and a library. The Mariano Escobedo plaza has an “oriental” style kiosk surrounded by large trees. On one side the main parish church called the Nuestra Señora de Guadalupe dominates. This church was begun in 1904 and was supposed to be much larger than it is, but construction was suspended due to the Mexican Revolution. It has an austere facade and the interior has black pews. The most important yearly event in the municipal seat is the feast of the Virgin of Guadalupe on 12 December.

Handcrafts such as saddles, leather goods and wooden barrels for water storage can be found in the town.

== Geography ==
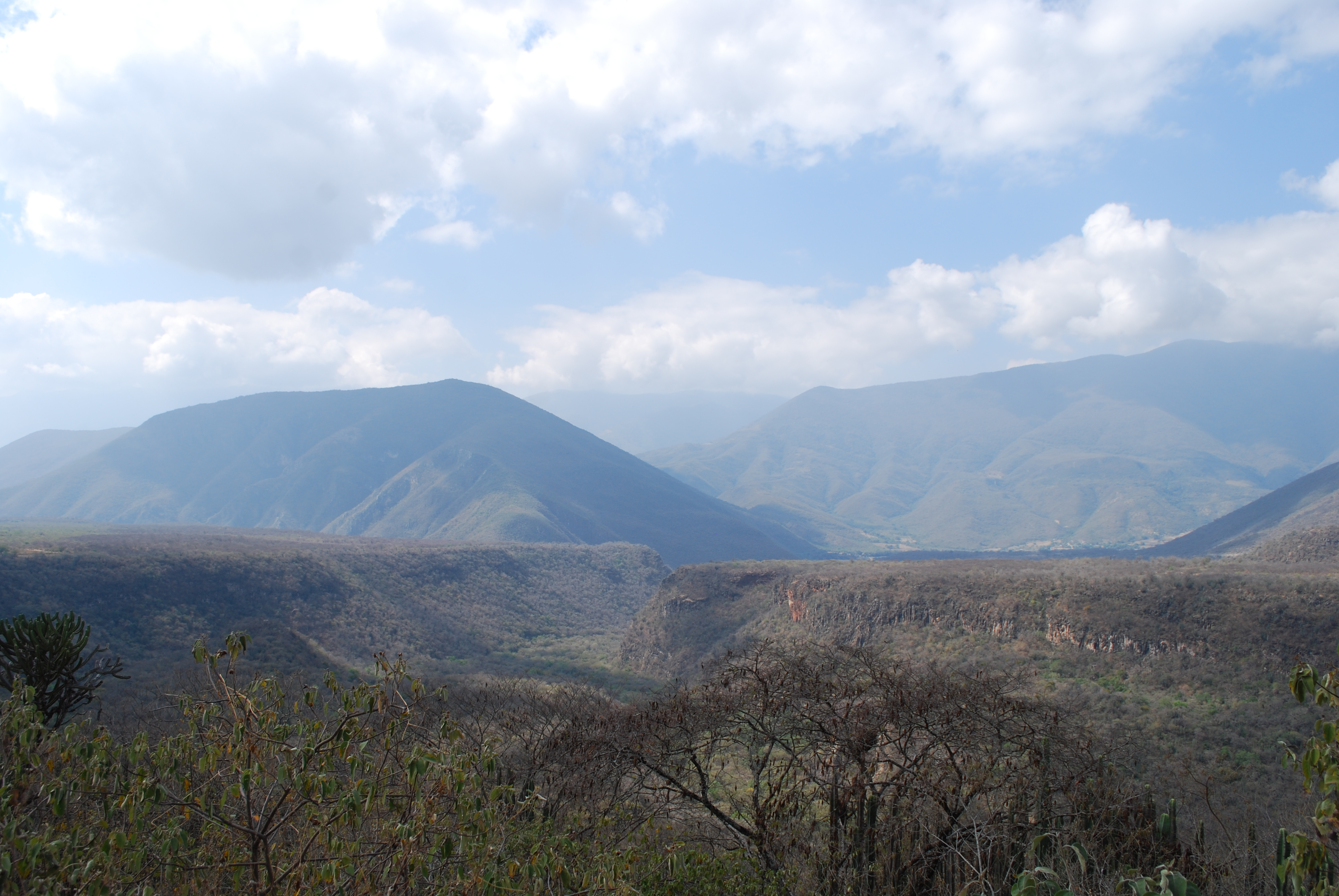
Area between Concá and Arroyo Seco (town)

The municipality is part of the Sierra Gorda region, which is centered on northern Querétaro state. This region is a branch of the Sierra Madre Oriental, consisting of mountain chains that parallel the Gulf of Mexico. This land was sea bed 100 million years ago, which formed ancient sedimentary rock, mostly limestone, which easily erodes. This makes the area part of the Huasteca Karst Arroyo Seco is completely within the Sierra Gorda Biosphere Reserve of Querétaro, which was established in 1997.

Most of the territory is mountainous, with gradients of over 25%. Altitudes in the territory range from 560 to 1340 masl with an average of 980masl. The mountain formations are subdivided into two parts. The first is a corridor along the border with Jalpan which is over forty km long and five km wide. This area has some very low valleys of only 700 masl. The second area is more rugged with canyons of up to 600 meters deep and peaks which reach over 2000 masl. There are a number of flat areas and valleys which are mostly along the Ayutla and Concá rivers. The principal elevations are Santo Domingo, Cantera, Cofradía, Soledad and Pitorreal.

The terrain is composed of sedimentary rock, mostly layers of limestone, which present on the surface with medium or fine grain and sometimes as clay. It, like most of the Sierra Gorda, is on former sea bed from 150 million years ago. Recently, Arroyo Seco and other municipalities of the Sierra Gorda have reported numerous small earthquakes. According to seismologists, these are caused by the movement of water through sedimentary rock. Erosion causes gaps and then the gaps settle onto themselves, causing the small quakes. One thing scientists are checking for is to see if any areas stand over underground cavities which may give way.

The area's location over the Huasteca Karst and the erosion of limestone has given rise to numerous pit caves. The largest of these in the Sierra Gorda is located in Arroyo Seco, called the Sótano de Barro, located in the Santa María de los Cocos community. The Sótano del Barro is one of the largest cavities of the world by volume, measuring 15 million cubic metres, surpassed only the Sima Mayor de Sarisariñama in Venezuela. In comparison, the Sótano de Las Golondrinas has a volume of only five million meters cubed. Its widest diameter measures 420 meters and its average width is 200 meters. It has a total depth of 455 meters with a direct drop of 410 meters. Its perimeter is surrounded by dense vegetation, which is a sanctuary for green macaws. It requires a walk or mule ride of about two hours through dense forest to reach. The walls of the pit cave are mostly vertical and partially covered by vegetation. At the bottom of the cave there is a small forest on a floor which was sea bed 100 million years ago, which measures 220 meters long and 100 meters wide. Despite its depth, the bottom of the pit cave receives an abundance of sunlight allowing for the growth of trees and other vegetation, making it an isolated mini forest. The bottom also has a number of small caves, with the largest fifty meters long. This pit cave has been classified as the deepest in the world although this has recently been challenged by those who wish to include those pit caves which are not continuous such as the Stary Swistak in Austria, which has a total depth of 480 meters.

=== Hydrography ===
Principal river systems include the Santa María, the Ayutla River and the Jalpan River with their tributaries such as the Concá River in the south of the municipality. The Santa María enters the municipality from San Luis Potosí and flows along a 400 meter deep canyon until it merges with the Ayutla River. This river flows northeast, forming another canyon then merges with the Jalpan River. There are about 100 accessible sources of water in the municipality with most located in the communities of Salitrillo, Concá and Ayutla. The municipality is home to the junction of two of the major rivers of the Sierra Gorda, the Santa María and the Ayutla River at a location called Las Adjuntas. The Santa María River here flows warm to hot in the summer and the Ayutla River remains cold. Although the two rivers have different water colors and temperatures, both are regulated by the surrounding environment. The Santa María River has a number of beaches which are open to camping. There is also sports fishing of native catfish. The northern border of the municipality is partially formed by the Verde River. The Concá Waterfall is located just south of the town of the same name. This waterfall is fed by a fresh water spring and falls into the Santa María River. Despite the name (which means dry stream or dry arroyo), most of the arroyos in the area have water in them most of the year. The municipality has ten easily accessible sources of surface water. However, the over extraction of water has led to dropping water tables and many of the area's fresh water springs are flowing at slower rates or have dried up.

=== Climate ===
The municipality divides into two climate regions. The north is semi arid with an average temperature of 22C and an annual rainfall of between five and 10.5mm per falling mostly in the summer. The other is semi hot with average temperatures varying from 18 to 22C with rains in the summer. In the winter, the area is vulnerable to cold spells, brought in by cold fronts that arrive from the north and west. The cold spells do not usually reach freezing as the municipality does not have the high peaks that neighbors such as Pinal de Amoles does, but snow mixed with rain fell in 2006 and in 2010, freezing temperatures did reach communities such as La Florida and San Juan Buenaventura. Very cold temperatures can prompt emergency services such as the provision of blankets by the municipality's civil protection service or evacuation to shelters. Communities which are most vulnerable to severe cold include La Sanguijuela, La Escondida de Guadalupe, La Cantera, Río del Carrizal and El Durazno. The area has had problems with droughts over the past decade, especially in 2009, which have been draining reserves and aquifers. The lack of water has caused the deaths of livestock and forced more people to emigrate from the municipality. Many communities now must rely on water trucked in from outside.

=== Flora and fauna ===
Vegetation on the limestone and other sedimentary soils ranges from lowland rainforest to grasslands to scrub brush in more arid areas. In forested areas, the trees include oaks, pines, white cedar, strawberry trees and oyamels. In the drier areas, there are also mesquite trees with some other desert plants including cactus. In the lowest elevations there are tropical hardwoods such as red cedar, Montezuma cypress and a tree called the “parota.” Wildlife mostly consists of birds and mammals such as doves, quails, chachalacas, eagles, roadrunners, and some waterfowl. Mammals include squirrels, rabbits, armadillos, white-tailed deer, foxes, coyotes, wild boar, pumas, raccoons, skunks, and opossums. There are some reptiles such as rattlesnakes and coral snakes.

== Culture ==
The most popular traditional music is Huapango, especially Huapango arribeño. It is most often played in “topadas” a type of musical duel between two musicians competing on improvisation of lyrics and melodies. Many of the songs are about history, arte and current events. In 2006, Guadalupe Reyes Reyes from El Refugio won the Premio Nacional de Ciencias y Artes in the Popular Arts category. He won the award for his contributions to Huapango arribeño. Reyes formed the band, Los Reyes de El Refugio and their work mostly focuses on rural life in the Sierra Gorda. He was born 1931, but had to work at farming early, learning to read and write mostly on his own. He was taught guitar and found he had musical ability, becoming a cantor at the local church when he was 14.

Typical dishes include jerky, cecina, “Serrano” style enchiladas and pit cooked barbacoa. Sweets include “chancaquillas” which is made with piloncillo and squash seeds. Beverages include aguamiel and pulque along with atole with sunflower seeds.

The various communities have festivals in honor of local patron saints, but the most important festival in the municipality is that honoring the Archangel Michael on 29 September. It is celebrated with street fairs and crafts exhibitions.

== The mission church of Concá ==
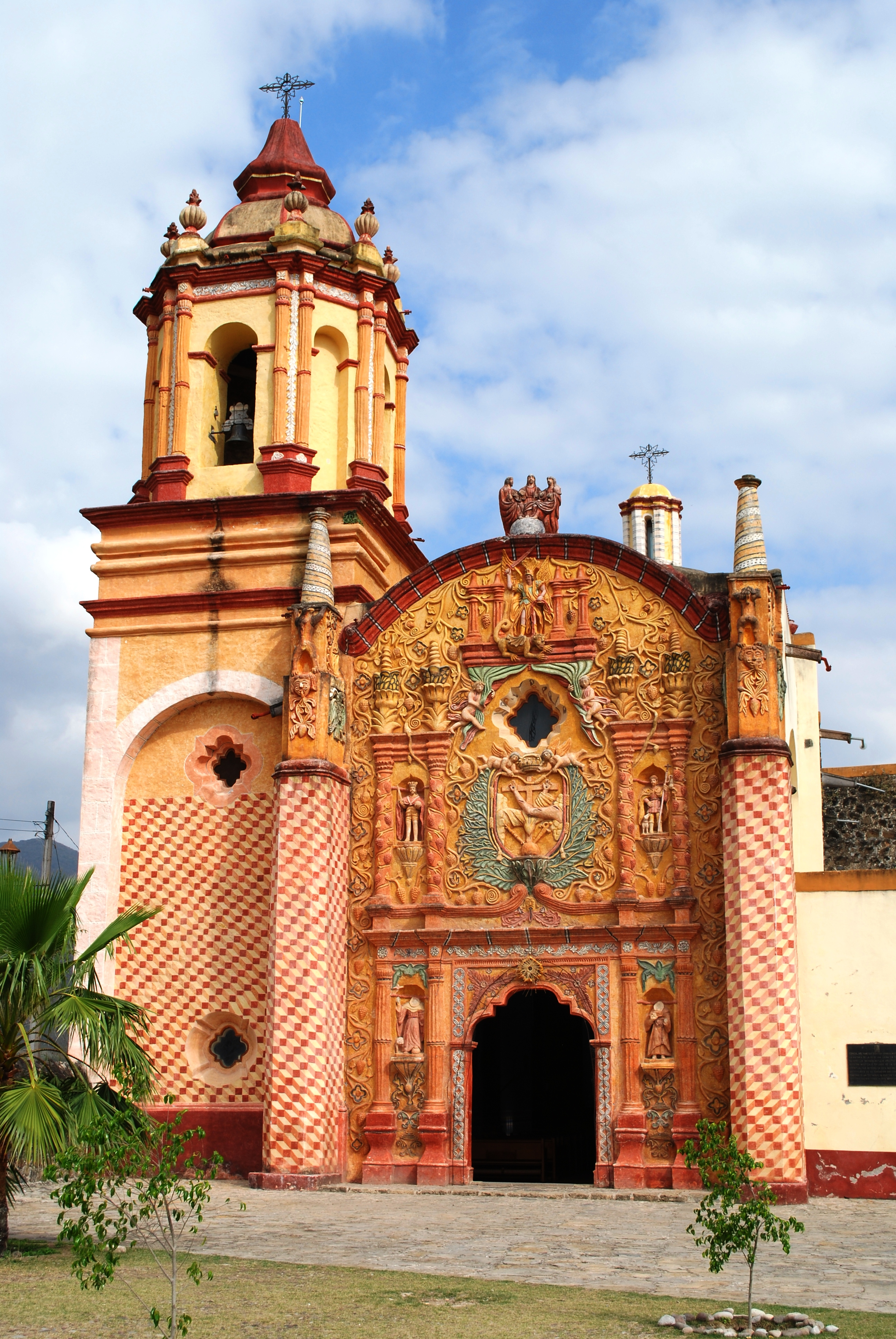
Facade of the mission church at Concá

The mission complex at Concá is one of five Franciscan missions which were built under the direction of Junípero Serra in the mid-to-late 18th century. The missions were the last in a long line of evangelization efforts in the Sierra Gorda, which were resisted by the indigenous peoples, especially the Chichimeca Jonaz for about two centuries. This resistance was militarily broken at the Battle of Media Luna in 1748. To consolidate Spanish dominance, the Franciscans under Serra had these churches with elaborate Baroque facades built in the heart of the Sierra Gorda. In addition to Concá, churches were built in Jalpan, Tancoyol, Landa and Tilaco. The facades are notable not only for their profuse decoration, but also for the appearance of a number of indigenous elements.

The Concá mission is the smallest of the five, but between 1754 and 1758 by José Antonio de Murguía and Joaquin Fernández Osorio. It is dedicated to the Archangel Michael, with the theme of the facade being “The Victory of the Faith.” It is considered to have the most indigenous elements, with many of its elements showing the more brusque work characteristic of indigenous decoration. More obvious is an image of the Holy Trinity at the crest, which is accompanied by a rabbit and a two-headed eagle, which are Pame symbols. Also prominent are the coat of arms of the Franciscan order, grapevines, two headed eagles, with the Virgin of Guadalupe and Our Lady of the Pillar, the patronesses of Mexico and Spain respectively.

After the missions were turned over to secular clergy, many indigenous abandoned them, a process that would continue with the Mexican War of Independence and Mexican Revolution, when the churches all suffered deterioration and sacking. Restoration of the churches began starting in 1979 until the 2000s. The five where inscribed together as a World Heritage Site in 2003.

== History ==
The town was originally known as the Presidio de Arroyo Seco, a military outpost. In 1833, missionary Francisco Cano Santander gave it the ecclesiastical name of Villa de Guadalupe which was the town's formal name until 1840, which it was changed to the current one. Its coat of arms has three parts. The first represents the Cross of the Holy Trinity with hands representing the indigenous peoples and the evangelizers. The second is the rabbit which appears on the facade of the mission church of Concá. This rabbit is the only one to appear on the five mission churches. The third is an arroyo from which the name comes.

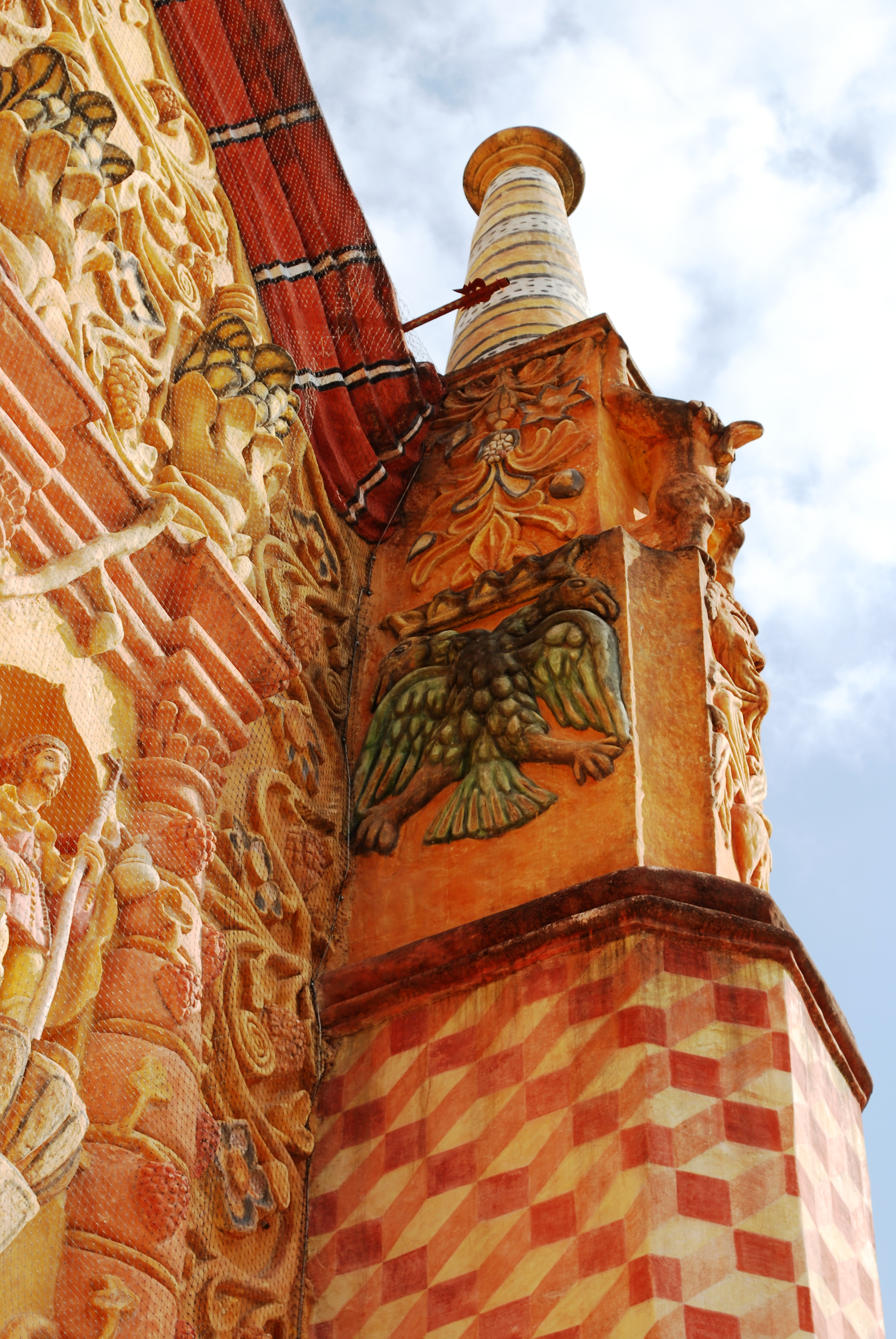
Double headed eagle on the Concá church

Arroyo Seco is part of the heart of the Sierra Gorda. This region has been occupied for about 6000 years. In the Pre Classic and Classic periods, the Sierra Gorda had a number of small cities as the climate at that time was wetter than it is now. Most of the larger cities were south of the current municipalities due to mining activities and major trade routes, but there were cities and trade routes through here as well, connecting the area mostly with Huasteca areas to the east and other areas to the north. As the climate of the Sierra Gorda dried out in the early Post Classic period, cities were abandoned for simpler hunter gatherer communities and there were migrations of Chichimecas, mostly Pames and Chichimeca Jonaz from the north. Arroyo Seco would become Pame territory. In the late pre Hispanic period, the Sierra Gorda had incursions from both the Purépecha and Aztecs from as early as 1400, attracted by the area's mineral deposits, but neither had true dominance as the Chichimecas fiercely opposed them. In the 15th century, the area was marginally dominated by the Oxitipa dominion, which was conquered by Moctezuma Ilhuicama and the Pames. This officially converted the area into an Aztec tributary state, but the Aztecs never truly had control.

The Spanish made incursions into the Sierra Gorda early in the colonial period, but the Chichimeca, especially the Jonaz just to the south, put up fierce resistance to their intrusions. This would keep the Spanish from fully dominating the area for two hundred years.

In 1532, Nuño Beltrán de Guzmán entered the Sierra Gorda and conquered it but did not hold it. From that time until the 18th century, there had been a number of missions established by the Franciscans and the Augustinians, but these missions were either destroyed by the Chichimecas or the population would flee from them and move into more inaccessible mountains and canyons. The first Spanish population in the Arroyo Seco area was in San Nicolás Concá, established as an encomienda under Pedro Guzmán between 1533 and 1538. This territory extended over much of the Sierra Gorda and into what is now San Luis Potosí. In 1587, Concá and Jalpan had missions established in them by the Augustinians from Xilitla. In 1601, friar Lucas de los Ángeles from the Xichú monastery preached in the area with limited success. In 1609, viceroy Luis de Velasco ordered that the Franciscans leave missionary work to the Augustinians, including the Arroyo Seco area. However, Franciscans from Michoacán stayed and worked with the Augustinians. Those who lasted longest in the area were those who learned the Pame language and learned to live with Pame customs.

The Spanish would break Chichimeca resistance in the Sierra Gorda in the 1740s, with the expeditions of José de Escandón, culminating in the Battle of Media Luna. To solidify these military gains, Franciscans founded new missions in this and other areas of northern Querétaro, the heart of the Sierra Gorda. These missions were taken over by Junípero Serra starting in 1750, who decided to have elaborate mission complexes built in five locations, one of which is in the municipality at Concá. In addition to evangelization, the missions worked to group the semi nomadic Pames into permanent communities centered on churches.

There was one battle here during the Mexican Revolution when forces under General Saturnino Cedillo and Coronel Marcial Cevallos took over the Concá Hacienda in 1918. The town of Arroyo Seco itself was also attacked by General Cedillo, who killed many non-combatants, sacked and burned the town. In retaliation, forces loyal to Venustiano Carranza recruited soldiers from Arroyo Seco and defeated Cedillo at the Laguna de Concá.

The town gained municipal status in 1933. At first the new municipality was governed by a committee headed by Antonio Rubio Chávez but the first municipal president, C. Angel Torres Montes, was elected in 1935.

In 1994, the municipality decided to build a garbage dump near the archaeological zone of San Rafael without informing the Instituto Nacional de Antropología e Historia (INAH). Since 2006, it has been known that the dump sits on the southern part of the site proper and that the digging of the dump site is estimated to have destroyed between eight and ten pyramids. More vestiges of the site lie 300 meters below the dump. The municipality promised for years to move the facility and from 2006, state and federal authorities have promised to replace it with a new one farther away. However, as of 2009, the dump is still operating taking on as much as forty tons of trash per week, as the new facility was not yet finished. In 2007, a smaller, above ground dump appeared in the same area, within sight of visible ruins. During this time, acids and other substances produced by the pit have probably caused damage to the limestone of the site, eating away at structures made of the substance. The site belongs to the Río Verde Culture and its estimated to extend over 10km2. Its importance has been compared to that of Tamtoc in San Luis Potosí.

In 1998, forests in the municipality were among those in five states destroyed by wildfires. In total, 180 hectares (440 acres) were burned. The fires were due to freezing conditions in the prior winter which dried out grasslands.

In the latter 2000s, the municipality has been struggling with water shortages due to drought conditions. The lack of water has caused the deaths of livestock and forced more people to emigrate from the municipality. Many communities now must rely on water trucked in from outside. As of 2007, sixteen out of forty six communities in the municipality have significant problems with water shortages. The government states that this is because a number of wells are drying up and there is insufficient distribution. In the second largest community of Purísima de Arista, about half of the residents experience water shortages. In 2009, the municipality had number of cases of cattle dying due to bites from “vampire” bats which were transmitting a type of paralytic rabies. The bats were coming from caves located in neighboring Guanajuato.

From the latter 2000s to the present, Arroyo Seco and the rest of the Sierra Gorda in Querétaro have been experiencing numerous small earthquakes, with most registering from 2.5 to 3.5 on the Richter scale, generally imperceptible to humans. Seismologists say that while the number has been unusual, such activity is not and is due to the settling of the sedimentary rock which is below most of the Sierra Gorda region. However, Arroyo Seco and other municipalities have seismographs installed to monitor the situation.

The municipality's recent history also includes the mass migration out by many of its working aged people due to lack of economic opportunity. Most have gone to the United States with as much as forty percent of the municipality's population living in the country alone. The money that these workers send back home have significantly changed the local economy, as it is larger than the locally generated economy and larger than annual municipal budget. The migration has caused municipality schools, especially primary schools to lose students as they leave for the United States with their parents.

In 2006, the municipality elected its first non-PRI municipal president since the Mexican Revolution, a former migrant worker by the name of Mariano Palacios Trejo, from the PRD.

Construction of a military base was begun in early 2011 at a 3-hectare (7.4-acre) site. The base is one of three being built to work against drug trafficking and other crimes along the Querétaro/San Luis Potosí border. This base is part of the 17th Military Zone to patrol the Querétaro-San Luis Potosí border. The military is there to countering drug trafficking in the area as the region does not have the resources for local police forces.

== Economy and tourism ==
The municipality is one of the most economically marginalized in the state, with the Secretaría de Desarrollo Social (SEDESOL) cataloging it as one of the 200 most socioeconomically marginalized in the country. This is the main reason why Arroyo Seco and other municipalities in the Sierra Gorda of Querétaro have high rates of emigration. It is not known exactly how many have left or how many come back at the end of the year to visit family, but Arroyo Seco estimates that about forty percent of its population is living somewhere in the United States. The amount sent back in remittances is also not known, but it has been estimated at between 50,000 and US$100,000 per day or about US$18 million per year to the Sierra Gorda alone, based on money exchanges made in the main city of Jalpan de Serra. This amount supersedes the annual municipal budget of Arroyo Seco and other area municipalities and generally superseded money generated by municipal economies. In Arroyo Seco, one in four homes is supported by dollars sent home by family in the United States. These migrants not only provide remittances directly to their families, they have also formed clubs with the purpose of promoting infrastructure projects in their home communities. The Club de Migrantes de la Sierra Gorda is an association of twenty seven of these clubs from various municipalities, with three from Arroyo Seco. Most of the projects are related paving, water distribution and sewerage/drainage. These dollars are often matched through a program sponsored by the Mexican federal government. Many businesses in the municipality and the rest of the Sierra Gorda take the dollar as currency, especially at the end of the year when many come to the area to visit family. Arroyo Seco has one of the highest rates of emigration in Querétaro. Arroyo Seco is one of the sponsors of the Día del Paisano to honor returning migrant workers in Jalpan de Serra. This events includes parades and raffles.

Because of this emigration, only 23.36% of the total population is economically active, mostly employed in traditional economic activities, such as agriculture, livestock, forestry and general commerce. About twenty percent of the total population works at home for no pay. Women make up only 22% of the paid workforce. Most of those who are not economically active are students and housewives.

Most of the territory is used for pasture and forestry, with total about ninety percent. The rest is used for agriculture, most of which is done only during the rainy season. Just over 43% of the economically active are working agriculture, livestock, forestry and fishing. Thirty of the municipality's communities engage in agriculture to some degree with most of the production for self consumption. The soil is fertile although it is sometimes hard with some drainage problems. These problems are greatest where the topsoil is less than ten centimeters. One problem with agriculture here is that the soil erodes easily. Fruit trees include mango, oranges, limes, bananas, guavas, avocados and papaya. Other crops such as sugar cane, corn, beans, green chili peppers, cascabel chili peppers, tomatoes, watermelon, squash, chickpeas, sorghum, barley and pitahaya. Most livestock is raised in the communities of El Refugio, San Juan Buenaventura, La Florida, San José de la Flores, Río de Carrizal, Ayutla, Salitrillo and Tepame. Most livestock is cattle with some sheep and goats.

The forests of the municipality make up about sixteen percent of the state's forest resources and cover 54% of the municipality. Over eighty percent of the forest is made up solely of broad-leafed trees with most of the rest a mix of broad-leafed and conifers. Logging is limited because of the tropical hardwoods here and conservation efforts related to the Sierra Gorda Biosphere Reserve, but it still makes up over 15% of the state's total. About 19% of the forested lands are used for grazing. Fish farming is a growing segment of the economy, especially in communities near rivers such as Río del Carrizal, Concá, Vegas Cuatas and Ayutla. About 25% are working in mining, construction, utilities and manufacturing.

Commerce, transportation and services employ about eighteen percent. There are about 140 people dedicated to commerce, most of which is small grocery stores. Supermarkets and other similar stores are located in neighboring San Luis Potosí in Río Verde and San Ciro. Tourism is a small percentage of the economy, mostly based on the mission church at Concá and some resort hotels opened in recent years. People also visit to see the 1000-year-old Montezuma Bald Cypress (Taxodium mucronatum), called the Árbol Milenario or Millennium Tree. Its trunk has the second largest diameter in Mexico after the Tule tree in Oaxaca, requiring twenty two children linking hands to surround it. From its roots flows one of the fresh water springs of the community. During the colonial period, there were several haciendas in the municipality. One of these was San Nicolás de Concá, which still has abundant vegetation, a large fresh water spring and hiking trails. The main house has been converted into a hotel, conserving part of the original structure made of adobe, with rustic stairs, wooden roof beams and gardens. The San Nicolas Conca hotel has fifty rooms and is owned by an American by the name of Sharpton. The hacienda was originally dedicated to sugar cane and dates from the 18th century.

The El Abanico water park has two swimming pools, a wading pool, restaurant and gardens and areas for camping. It is located next to the Concá Hacienda.

The Hotel Ayutla water park has two swimming pools, three wading pools, sports fields, picnic areas, restaurant, gardens and areas to camp.

== Archaeology ==
The San Rafael site was first documented in 1939 by the Instituto Panamericano de Geografía e Historia. Some work was done on the site by archaeologists such as Dominique Michelet for about a decade. This work determined that the site was occupied from 200 to 900 CE as a Mesoamerican city with temples, plazas, patios and residences located around four Mesoamerican ball courts. The city was a regional seat of government with strong Huasteca influence. It had a total of 250 buildings even larger than the better known sites of Las Ranas and Toluquilla.

Eight to ten structures are considered destroyed and more may have suffered irreversible damage by acids eating way the limestone blocks. As of 2006, the limits of the sites have still not been defined. The vestiges of the site lie about three hundred meters below the dump. The site belongs to the Río Verde Culture and its estimated to extend over 10km2. Its importance has been compared to that of Tamtoc in San Luis Potosí.
