= Malta in the Eurovision Song Contest 2009 =

- Eurovision Song Contest 2009
- Participating broadcaster: Public Broadcasting Services (PBS)
- Country: Malta
- Selection process: GO Malta EuroSong 2009
- Selection date: 7 February 2009

Competing entry
- Song: "What If We"
- Artist: Chiara
- Songwriters: Marc Paelinck; Gregory Bilsen

Placement
- Semi-final result: Qualified (6th, 86 points)
- Final result: 22nd, 31 points

Participation chronology

Malta was represented at the Eurovision Song Contest 2009 with the song "What If We", written by Marc Paelinck and Gregory Bilsen, and performed by Chiara. The Maltese participating broadcaster, Public Broadcasting Services (PBS), selected its entry through the national final GO Malta EuroSong 2009. The competition consisted of a semi-final round and a final, held between 8 November 2008 and 7 February 2009, where "What If We" performed by Chiara eventually emerged as the winning entry after scoring the most points from a jury in the first round and gaining the most votes from a public televote in the second round with 12,249 votes. Chiara had previously represented Malta in 1998 and in 2005, when she achieved third and second place with the songs "The One That I Love" and "Angel", respectively.

Malta was drawn to compete in the first semi-final of the Eurovision Song Contest which took place on 12 May 2009. Performing during the show in position 17, "What If We" was announced among the 10 qualifying entries of the first semi-final and therefore qualified to compete in the final on 16 May. It was later revealed that Malta placed sixth out of the 18 participating countries in the semi-final with 86 points. In the final, Malta performed in position 14 and placed twenty-second out of the 25 participating countries, scoring 31 points.

== Background ==
Prior to the 2009 contest, the Maltese Broadcasting Authority (MBA) until 1975, and the Public Broadcasting Services (PBS) since 1991, had participated in the Eurovision Song Contest representing Malta twenty-one times since MBA's first entry in 1971. After competing in 1975, Malta was absent from the contest beginning in 1976. The country had, to this point, competed in every contest since returning in 1991. Their best placing in the contest thus far was second, which it achieved on two occasions: in 2002 with the song "7th Wonder" performed by Ira Losco and in 2005 with the song "Angel" performed by Chiara. In 2008, "Vodka" performed by Morena failed to qualify to the final.

As part of its duties as participating broadcaster, PBS organises the selection of its entry in the Eurovision Song Contest and broadcasts the event in the country. The broadcaster confirmed its intentions to participate at the 2009 contest on 3 June 2008. The Maltese broadcaster had selected its entry consistently through a national final procedure, a method that was continued for its 2009 participation.

== Before Eurovision ==
=== GO Malta EuroSong 2009 ===
GO Malta EuroSong 2009 was the national final format developed by PBS to select the Maltese entry for the Eurovision Song Contest 2009. The competition consisted of a semi-final held between 8 November 2008 and 10 January 2009, and a final held on 7 February 2009. All shows were broadcast on Television Malta (TVM) as well on the broadcaster's website pbs.com.mt.

==== Format ====
The competition consisted of fifty-six songs competing in the semi-final which consisted of eight shows titled Euro Showbox between 8 November 2008 and 10 January 2009. Seven songs were presented in each show and a total of twenty entries qualified to compete in the final on 7 February 2009. In the semi-final, six judges evaluated the songs and each judge had an equal stake in the result. Fifteen of the qualifying entries were the songs that received the highest scores from the judges, while the remaining five qualifying entries were based on the results of the public televote from the remaining forty-one entries. The final consisted of two rounds: the first round selected the top three entries based on the votes of five judges in addition to the jury votes in the first selection phase and the semi-final, while the second round (superfinal) determined the winner exclusively by public televoting.

==== Competing entries ====
Artists and composers were able to submit their entries between 13 and 14 October 2008 to the Television House in Gwardamanġa. Songwriters from any nationality were able to submit songs as long as the artist were Maltese or possessed Maltese citizenship. Songwriters were able to submit as many songs as they wished, however, artists were only able to submit a maximum of two songs and could only compete with a maximum of one in the final. 182 entries were received by the broadcaster and the fifty-six songs selected to compete in the semi-final were announced on 27 October 2008. Among the selected competing artists were former Maltese Eurovision entrants Georgina who represented Malta in the 1991 contest, Miriam Christine who represented Malta in the 1996 contest, Chiara who represented Malta in the 1998 and 2005 contests, and Ludwig Galea who represented Malta in the 2004 contest. The jury panel that selected the fifty-six semi-finalists consisted of Alon Amir (Israel), Frank Cachia (Malta), Lenoir Francis (France), Alvin Laudi (Malta), Nadienne Sacco (Malta), Vincent Scerri (Malta) and No Yon (South Korea/Japan).

Artist	Song	Songwriter(s)
Alison Ellul	"Typical Me"	Philip Vella, Gerard James Borg
Annabelle Debono	"Army of Lovers"	Sean Vella, Gerard James Borg
Baklava	"Kamikaze Lover"	Philip Vella, Gerard James Borg
Chiara	"What If We"	Marc Paelinck, Gregory Bilsen
Christian Arding	"This Ain't a Love Song"	Trevor Fenech, Claudia Faniello
Christine Barbara	"Life is an Opera"	Rita Pace
Christine Barbara	"Visions of You"	Philip Vella
Claire Caruana	"Harmony"	Augusto Cardinali, Giovann Attard
Classic Rebels	"Tonight at the Opera"	Ralph Siegel, John O'Flynn
Claudia Faniello	"Blue Sonata"	Ray Agius
Claudia Faniello	"Midas Touch"	Sean Vella, Philip Vella
Corazon Mizzi	"Another Side of Me"	Philip Vella
Daniela Vella	"Soulmate"	Ray Agius, Alfred C. Sant
Dario and Grecia Bezzina	"Fjamma tas-Sliem"	Philip Vella
Derrick Schembri and Yanika Fava	"For a Moment"	Philip Vella, Rita Pace
Dominic Cini	"I'm in Heaven"	Elton Zarb, Rita Pace
Dorothy Bezzina	"Mozart Revives"	Chan Vella, Alexia Schembri
Eleanor Cassar	"Someday"	Paul Giordimaina, Fleur Balzan
Eleanor Cassar	"This Is Our Life"	Paul Giordimaina, Fleur Balzan
The Elements	"Ħa Ħi Ħu"	Carm Fenech
Evita Magri	"Sexy Girls"	Philip Vella, Melchiore Magri
Francesca Borg	"Falling in Love"	Jason Paul Cassar, Mario J. Farrugia
Georgina	"To Be Myself"	Rafael Artesero, Joe Julian Farrugia
Georgina and Ruth Casingena	"Avalon"	Paul Abela, Joe Julian Farrugia
Gloriana Arpa Belli	"Love Was Made of Clay"	Renato Briffa, Doris Chetcuti
J. Anvil	"Choose Your Number"	Augusto Cardinali, Giovann Attard
J. Anvil	"Love Me or Leave Me"	Trevor Fenech, Claudia Faniello
Jamie Tonna	"Where Was I?"	Jason Paul Cassar, Mario J. Farrugia
Jessica Muscat	"Hey You"	Rafael Artesero
Jessica Muscat	"Smoke-Screen"	Philip Vella, Gerard James Borg
Jo Zette	"I'm Me"	Steve Compagno, Noel Zammit
Josmar	"Circus"	Josmar Gatt
Julie Pomorski	"Shades of Memories"	Johann Schembri
Justine feat. Siconix	"Rhythm of the Night"	Renato Briffa, Doris Chetcuti
Klinsmann	"Butterfly Sky"	Klinsmann Coleiro, Joe Julian Farrugia
Klinsmann	"Rock and Rise"	Philip Vella, Gerard James Borg
Kylie Coleiro	"Let It Shine"	Andrew Zahra, Joe Julian Farrugia
Laura Bruno	"Something About You"	Philip Vella, Gerard James Borg
Ludwig Galea	"Inferno"	Philip Vella, Gerard James Borg
Ludwig Galea feat. Fidela tal-Bambinu	"Lament"	Philip Vella
Maria Mallia	"Love in the Sahara"	Charlene Grech, Clinton Paul
Marija Galdes	"Castaway"	Philip Vella, Rita Pace
Miriam Christine	"Mama"	Miriam Christine Warner
Natasha and Charlene	"Alchemy"	Charlene Grech, John A. Agius
Natasha and Charlene	"King"	Charlene Grech, John A. Agius
Q	"Before You Walk Away"	Paul Giordimaina, Fleur Balzan
Q	"Live for Today"	Paul Giordimaina, Fleur Balzan
Raquela	"Crossroads"	Philip Vella, Gerard James Borg
Rebecca Bonnici	"Carry Me"	Renato Briffa, Rita Pace
Rosman Pace	"One Million Ways"	Rosman Pace
Ruth Portelli	"Blame It on Your Heart"	Ralph Siegel, John O'Flynn
Ruth Portelli	"Innocent Heart" (Note: The refrain of "Innocent Heart" was later used as a sample for the Montenegrin 2009 Eurovision entry "Just Get Out of My Life" performed by Andrea Demirović.)	Ralph Siegel, John O'Flynn
Talitha Dimech	"Earth and Sky"	Philip Vella, Gerard James Borg
Trilogy	"The Song in Your Heart"	Paul Abela, Joe Julian Farrugia
Vittorio and Dorothy	"Promises"	Chan Vella, Alexia Schembri
Wayne Micallef	"Where You Belong"	Wayne Micallef, Luke Ambrogio

==== Semi-final ====
The semi-final took place over the eight shows of Euro Showbox between 8 November 2008 and 10 January 2009, all held at the Audiovision TV Studios in Hamrun and hosted by Valerie Vella. Fifty-six songs competed for twenty qualifying spots in the final, which were announced during the last show of Euro Showbox on 10 January 2009. The allocation of the seven entries competing in each show was announced on 2 November 2008. Due to incorrect SMS numbers being displayed during the first show, a revote took place at the beginning of the second show. The six members of the jury that evaluated the entries during the semi-final consisted of:

- Kevin Abela (Malta) – Principal Trumpet of the Malta Philharmonic Orchestra and music director
- Munro Forbes (Cyprus) – Producer of various Eurovision Song Contest and Junior Eurovision Song Contest events
- Pascal-Emmanuel Luneau (France) – Musician, screenwriter, composer, author and vocal coach
- Ray Mangion (Malta) – Producer, artistic director and performer
- Denise Mulholland (United Kingdom) – Director and actress
- Marco Vannuzzi (Italy) – Music manager

Jury qualifier Public vote qualifier

Semi-final – 8 November 2008 – 10 January 2009
Broadcast	R/O	Artist	Song	Result
8 November 2008	1	Ludwig Galea feat. Fidela tal-Bambinu	"Lament"	—N/a
8 November 2008	2	Dominic Cini	"I'm in Heaven"	—N/a
8 November 2008	3	Classic Rebels	"Tonight at the Opera"	Qualified
8 November 2008	4	Klinsmann	"Rock and Rise"	—N/a
8 November 2008	5	Talitha Dimech	"Earth and Sky"	—N/a
8 November 2008	6	Rosman Pace	"One Million Ways"	Qualified
8 November 2008	7	Francesca Borg	"Falling in Love"	—N/a
15 November 2008	1	Q	"Live for Today"	—N/a
15 November 2008	2	Josmar	"Circus"	—N/a
15 November 2008	3	Jessica Muscat	"Smoke-Screen"	—N/a
15 November 2008	4	Georgina	"To Be Myself"	—N/a
15 November 2008	5	Laura Bruno	"Something About You"	—N/a
15 November 2008	6	Marija Galdes	"Castaway"	—N/a
15 November 2008	7	Vittorio and Dorothy	"Promises"	Qualified
29 November 2008	1	Trilogy	"The Song in Your Heart"	Qualified
29 November 2008	2	Dorothy Bezzina	"Mozart Revives"	—N/a
29 November 2008	3	Derrick Schembri and Yanika Fava	"For a Moment"	—N/a
29 November 2008	4	Jo Zette	"I'm Me"	—N/a
29 November 2008	5	Evita Magri	"Sexy Girls"	—N/a
29 November 2008	6	Christian Arding	"This Ain't a Love Song"	—N/a
29 November 2008	7	Gloriana Arpa Belli	"Love Was Made of Clay"	—N/a
6 December 2008	1	Ruth Portelli	"Innocent Heart"	—N/a
6 December 2008	2	Eleanor Cassar	"Someday"	Qualified
6 December 2008	3	Dario and Grecia Bezzina	"Fjamma tas-Sliem"	—N/a
6 December 2008	4	Claire Caruana	"Harmony"	—N/a
6 December 2008	5	Maria Mallia	"Love in the Sahara"	—N/a
6 December 2008	6	Natasha and Charlene	"Alchemy"	—N/a
6 December 2008	7	Claudia Faniello	"Midas Touch"	—N/a
13 December 2008	1	Miriam Christine	"Mama"	Qualified
13 December 2008	2	Baklava	"Kamikaze Lover"	Qualified
13 December 2008	3	Ruth Portelli	"Blame It on Your Heart"	—N/a
13 December 2008	4	J. Anvil	"Choose Your Number"	Qualified
13 December 2008	5	Corazon Mizzi	"Another Side of Me"	—N/a
13 December 2008	6	Rebecca Bonnici	"Carry Me"	—N/a
13 December 2008	7	Justine feat. Siconix	"Rhythm of the Night"	—N/a
20 December 2008	1	Jamie Tonna	"Where Was I?"	Qualified
20 December 2008	2	Q	"Before You Walk Away"	Qualified
20 December 2008	3	Julie Pomorski	"Shades of Memories"	—N/a
20 December 2008	4	Jessica Muscat	"Hey You"	—N/a
20 December 2008	5	Raquela	"Crossroads"	Qualified
20 December 2008	6	Ludwig Galea	"Inferno"	—N/a
20 December 2008	7	Kylie Coleiro	"Let It Shine"	Qualified
3 January 2009	1	Alison Ellul	"Typical Me"	Qualified
3 January 2009	2	Daniela Vella	"Soulmate"	—N/a
3 January 2009	3	Eleanor Cassar	"This Is Our Life"	—N/a
3 January 2009	4	Georgina and Ruth Casingena	"Avalon"	Qualified
3 January 2009	5	Claudia Faniello	"Blue Sonata"	Qualified
3 January 2009	6	Chiara	"What If We"	Qualified
3 January 2009	7	Christine Barbara	"Visions of You"	—N/a
10 January 2009	1	Natasha and Charlene	"King"	—N/a
10 January 2009	2	Annabelle Debono	"Army of Lovers"	—N/a
10 January 2009	3	J. Anvil	"Love Me or Leave Me"	—N/a
10 January 2009	4	Christine Barbara	"Life Is an Opera"	Qualified
10 January 2009	5	Klinsmann	"Butterfly Sky"	Qualified
10 January 2009	6	The Elements	"Ħa Ħi Ħu"	Qualified
10 January 2009	7	Wayne Micallef	"Where You Belong"	Qualified

==== Final ====
The final took place on 7 February 2009 at the Malta Fairs & Convention Centre in Ta' Qali, hosted by Pablo Micallef and Valerie Vella. The twenty entries that qualified from the semi-final were performed again and the winner was determined over two rounds of voting. In the first round, the top three entries were selected to qualify to the second round, the superfinal, after the votes of a five-member jury panel were combined with the jury votes in the first selection phase and the semi-final. In the superfinal, the winner was determined solely by a public televote. The show was opened with a guest performance by the Yada Dance Company, while the interval act featured performances by 2008 Maltese Eurovision entrant Morena, 2009 Turkish Eurovision entrant Hadise, 2009 British Eurovision entrants Jade Ewen and Andrew Lloyd Webber, and the local acts Niki Gravino, Airport Impressions, Crisitina Casolani and Toby, and The Riffs. After the results of the public televote in the superfinal were announced, "What If We" performed by Chiara was the winner. Among the five members of the jury that evaluated the entries during the final were former Eurovision entrants Linda Martin who represented Ireland and won the 1992 contest, and Nicki French who represented United Kingdom in the 2000 contest.

Final – 7 February 2009
R/O	Artist	Song	Points	Place
1	The Elements	"Ħa Ħi Ħu"	25	19
2	Baklava	"Kamikaze Lover"	30	18
3	J. Anvil	"Choose Your Number"	71	10
4	Wayne Micallef	"Where You Belong"	85	7
5	Classic Rebels	"Tonight at the Opera"	94	5
6	Vittorio and Dorothy	"Promises"	57	16
7	Chiara	"What If We"	129	1
8	Rosman Pace	"One Million Way"	76	9
9	Q	"Before You Walk Away"	124	3
10	Kylie Coleiro	"Let It Shine"	14	20
11	Jamie Tonna	"Where Was I?"	51	17
12	Christine Barbara	"Life is an Opera"	62	14
13	Eleanor Cassar	"Someday"	126	2
14	Raquela	"Crossroads"	71	11
15	Miriam Christine	"Mama"	61	15
16	Georgina and Ruth Casingena	"Avalon"	71	12
17	Alison Ellul	"Typical Me"	79	8
18	Trilogy	"The Song In Your Heart"	87	6
19	Claudia Faniello	"Blue Sonata"	113	4
20	Klinsmann	"Butterfly Sky"	65	13

Detailed Jury Votes
R/O	Song	First Phase	Semi-final	Final					Total
R/O	Song	First Phase	Semi-final	Juror 1	Juror 2	Juror 3	Juror 4	Juror 5	Total
1	"Ħa Ħi Ħu"	12	1	3	4	2	1	2	25
2	"Kamikaze Lover"	7	3	9	3	3	2	3	30
3	"Choose Your Number"	3	12	16	17	10	3	10	71
4	"Where You Belong"	2	18	17	12	9	12	15	85
5	"Tonight at the Opera"	18	15	6	20	7	20	8	94
6	"Promises"	6	9	4	5	11	13	9	57
7	"What If We"	20	22	18	13	16	22	18	129
8	"One Million Way"	11	13	8	9	17	5	13	76
9	"Before You Walk Away"	22	20	12	18	18	17	17	124
10	"Let It Shine"	4	2	1	1	1	4	1	14
11	"Where Was I?"	1	5	11	11	12	7	4	51
12	"Life is an Opera"	17	7	7	6	6	14	5	62
13	"Someday"	8	14	22	22	22	18	20	126
14	"Crossroads"	10	17	2	10	8	8	16	71
15	"Mama"	16	6	10	2	4	9	14	61
16	"Avalon"	13	10	5	16	5	15	7	71
17	"Typical Me"	14	8	14	8	13	10	12	79
18	"The Song In Your Heart"	15	16	13	7	14	11	11	87
19	"Blue Sonata"	9	11	20	15	20	16	22	113
20	"Butterfly Sky"	5	4	15	14	15	6	6	65

Superfinal – 7 February 2009
R/O	Artist	Song	Televote	Place
1	Chiara	"What If We"	12,249	1
2	Q	"Before You Walk Away"	4,619	3
3	Eleanor Cassar	"Someday"	9,785	2

=== Promotion ===
Chiara made several appearances across Europe to specifically promote "What If We" as the Maltese Eurovision entry. On 18 February, Chiara performed during the Greek Eurovision national final. On 1 March, she performed during the presentation show of the 2009 Bosnian Eurovision entry, BH Eurosong 2009. Chiara also completed promotional activities in Belgium following her performances in Greece and Bosnia and Herzegovina. On 18 April, Chiara performed during the Eurovision in Concert event which was held at the Amsterdam Marcanti venue in Amsterdam, Netherlands and hosted by Marga Bult and Maggie MacNeal.

== At Eurovision ==
The Eurovision Song Contest 2009 took place at the Olimpiysky Arena in Moscow, Russia and consisted of two semi-finals on 12 and 14 May, and the final of 16 May 2009. According to Eurovision rules, all nations with the exceptions of the host country and the "Big Four" (France, Germany, Spain and the United Kingdom) are required to qualify from one of two semi-finals in order to compete for the final; the top nine songs from each semi-final as determined by televoting progress to the final, and a tenth was determined by back-up juries. The European Broadcasting Union (EBU) split up the competing countries into six different pots based on voting patterns from previous contests, with countries with favourable voting histories put into the same pot. On 30 January 2009, an allocation draw was held which placed each country into one of the two semi-finals. Malta was placed into the first semi-final, to be held on 12 May 2009. The running order for the semi-finals was decided through another draw on 16 March 2009 and Malta was set to perform in position 17, following the entry from Portugal and before the entry from Bosnia and Herzegovina.

The two semi-finals and the final were broadcast in Malta on TVM with commentary by Valerie Vella. The Maltese spokesperson, who announced the Maltese votes during the final, was Pauline Agius.

=== Semi-final ===
Chiara took part in technical rehearsals on 4 and 8 May, followed by dress rehearsals on 11 and 12 May. The Maltese performance featured Chiara wearing a black dress with Swarovski crystals, designed by Maltese fashion brand Charles and Ron, and performing alone on stage. The background LED screens projected a starry night with a mixture of darker and lighter shades in blue colours. The performance was originally to have featured smoke effects, however, the Maltese delegation opted not to use the effect in the broadcast performance.

At the end of the show, Malta was announced as having finished in the top 10 and consequently qualifying for the grand final. It was later revealed that Malta placed sixth in the semi-final, receiving a total of 86 points.

=== Final ===
Shortly after the first semi-final, a winners' press conference was held for the ten qualifying countries. As part of this press conference, the qualifying artists took part in a draw to determine which half of the grand final they would subsequently participate in. This draw was done in the order the countries appeared in the semi-final running order. Malta was drawn to perform in position 14, following the entry from Moldova and before the entry from Estonia.

Chiara once again took part in dress rehearsals on 15 and 16 May before the final, including the jury final where the professional juries cast their final votes before the live show. Chiara performed a repeat of her semi-final performance during the final on 16 May. Malta placed twenty-second in the final, scoring 31 points.

=== Voting ===
The voting system for 2009 involved each country awarding points from 1-8, 10 and 12, with the points in the final being decided by a combination of 50% national jury and 50% televoting. Each nation's jury consisted of five music industry professionals who are citizens of the country they represent. This jury judged each entry based on: vocal capacity; the stage performance; the song's composition and originality; and the overall impression by the act. In addition, no member of a national jury was permitted to be related in any way to any of the competing acts in such a way that they cannot vote impartially and independently.

Following the release of the full split voting by the EBU after the conclusion of the competition, it was revealed that Malta had placed twenty-fourth with the public televote and thirteenth with the jury vote in the final. In the public vote, Malta scored 18 points, while with the jury vote, Malta scored 87 points.

Below is a breakdown of points awarded to Estonia and awarded by Malta in the first semi-final and grand final of the contest, and the breakdown of the jury voting and televoting conducted during the two shows:

==== Points awarded to Malta ====
Points awarded to Malta (Semi-final 1)
Score	Country
12 points	
10 points	United Kingdom
8 points	Belarus; Belgium
7 points	Czech Republic
6 points	Andorra; Portugal; Romania
5 points	Bosnia and Herzegovina; Iceland; Israel
4 points	Sweden
3 points	Armenia; Bulgaria; Finland; Germany; Switzerland
2 points	
1 point	Montenegro

Points awarded to Malta (Final)
Score	Country
12 points	
10 points	
8 points	
7 points	Serbia
6 points	United Kingdom
5 points	Ireland
4 points	Germany
3 points	Finland; Romania
2 points	
1 point	Andorra; Latvia; Lithuania

==== Points awarded by Malta ====
Points awarded by Malta (Semi-final 1)
Score	Country
12 points	Iceland
10 points	Turkey
8 points	Sweden
7 points	Bosnia and Herzegovina
6 points	Montenegro
5 points	Finland
4 points	Israel
3 points	Andorra
2 points	Romania
1 point	Belarus

Points awarded by Malta (Final)
Score	Country
12 points	Iceland
10 points	United Kingdom
8 points	Norway
7 points	Greece
6 points	Denmark
5 points	Turkey
4 points	Sweden
3 points	Finland
2 points	Ukraine
1 point	Azerbaijan

==== Detailed voting results ====
Detailed voting results from Malta (Final)
R/O	Country	Results			Points
R/O	Country	Jury	Televoting	Combined	Points
01	Lithuania				
02	Israel	3		3	
03	France	1		1	
04	Sweden		5	5	4
05	Croatia	2		2	
06	Portugal				
07	Iceland	12	10	22	12
08	Greece	6	6	12	7
09	Armenia				
10	Russia				
11	Azerbaijan		3	3	1
12	Bosnia and Herzegovina				
13	Moldova				
14	Malta				
15	Estonia				
16	Denmark	8	4	12	6
17	Germany		2	2	
18	Turkey		8	8	5
19	Albania				
20	Norway	10	7	17	8
21	Ukraine	5		5	2
22	Romania				
23	United Kingdom	7	12	19	10
24	Finland	4	1	5	3
25	Spain				
