= Malta in the Eurovision Song Contest 2008 =

- Eurovision Song Contest 2008
- Participating broadcaster: Public Broadcasting Services (PBS)
- Country: Malta
- Selection process: The GO Malta Song for Europe 2008
- Selection date: 26 January 2008

Competing entry
- Song: "Vodka"
- Artist: Morena
- Songwriters: Philip Vella; Gerard James Borg

Placement
- Semi-final result: Failed to qualify (14th)

Participation chronology

Malta was represented at the Eurovision Song Contest 2008 with the song "Vodka", composed by Philip Vella, with lyrics by Gerard James Borg, and performed by Morena. The Maltese participating broadcaster, Public Broadcasting Services (PBS), selected its entry for the contest through the national final The GO Malta Song for Europe 2008. The competition consisted of a semi-final round and a final, held on 24 and 26 January 2008, respectively, where "Vodka" performed by Morena eventually emerged as the winning entry after scoring the most points from a seven-member jury and a public televote.

Malta was drawn to compete in the second semi-final of the Eurovision Song Contest which took place on 22 May 2008. Performing during the show in position 16, "Vodka" was not announced among the 10 qualifying entries of the second semi-final and therefore did not qualify to compete in the final on 24 May. It was later revealed that Malta placed fourteenth out of the 19 participating countries in the semi-final with 38 points.

== Background ==
Prior to the 2008 contest, the Maltese Broadcasting Authority (MBA) until 1975, and the Public Broadcasting Services (PBS) since 1991, had participated in the Eurovision Song Contest representing Malta twenty times since MBA's first entry in 1971. After competing in 1975, Malta was absent from the contest beginning in 1976. The country had, to this point, competed in every contest since returning in 1991. Their best placing in the contest thus far was second, which it achieved on two occasions: in 2002 with the song "7th Wonder" performed by Ira Losco and in 2005 with the song "Angel" performed by Chiara. In 2007, "Vertigo" performed by Olivia Lewis failed to qualify to the final.

As part of its duties as participating broadcaster, PBS organises the selection of its entry in the Eurovision Song Contest and broadcasts the event in the country. The broadcaster confirmed its intentions to participate at the 2008 contest on 19 June 2007. The Maltese broadcaster had selected its entry consistently through a national final procedure, a method that was continued for its 2008 participation.

== Before Eurovision ==
=== The GO Malta Song for Europe 2008 ===
The GO Malta Song for Europe 2008 was the national final format developed by PBS to select its entry for the Eurovision Song Contest 2008. The competition consisted of a semi-final and final held on 24 and 26 January 2008, respectively, at the Malta Fairs & Conventions Centre in Ta' Qali. Both shows were hosted by former Maltese Eurovision entrant Chiara who represented Malta in 1998 and 2005, John Demanuele and Ruth Casingena and broadcast on Television Malta (TVM) as well on the website di-ve.com.

==== Format ====
The competition consisted of seventeen songs competing in the semi-final on 24 January 2008 where the top eight entries qualified to compete in the final on 26 January 2008. Seven judges evaluated the songs during the semi-final and each judge had an equal stake in the final result. The eight qualifying entries were the songs that received the highest scores from the judges. In the final, the results were based on the results of the public televote and the votes of five judges.

==== Competing entries ====
Artists and composers were able to submit their entries between 12 and 13 November 2007. Both artists and songwriters were required to be Maltese or possess Maltese citizenship. Songwriters were able to submit as many songs as they wished, however, artists were only able to submit a maximum of two songs. 225 entries were received by the broadcaster. On 24 November 2007, a shortlist of 36 entries that had progressed through the selection process were announced on the TVM programme Il-Weekend Jibda Hawn. The seventeen songs selected to compete in the semi-final were announced in a press conference held at the Salesians Hall in Sliema on 9 January 2008. Among the selected competing artists were former Maltese Eurovision entrants Mary Spiteri who represented Malta in 1992, and Chris and Moira who represented Malta in 1994. The jury panel that selected the seventeen semi-finalists consisted of David Heffernan (Ireland), Anjelina Kirilova (Bulgaria), Viktoria Branimirova (Bulgaria), Wolfgang Weyand (Germany), Michal Dvořák (Czech Republic) and Gerry Keane (United Kingdom).

==== Semi-final ====
The semi-final took place on 24 January 2008. Seventeen songs competed for eight qualifying spots in the final. The running order for the semi-final was announced on 9 January 2008. The show was opened with a guest performance by the Boom Band and Ruth Casingena, while the interval act featured further performances by Ruth Casingena together with Chiara. The seven members of the jury that evaluated the entries during the semi-final consisted of:

- José Luis Ayllón (Spain) – Radio DJ
- José Juan Santana (Spain) – Composer and singer
- Johnny Jørgensen (Denmark) – Music teacher
- Horst Senker (Germany) – Producer of the music department at Westdeutscher Rundfunk (WDR)
- Marios Anastasiou (Cyprus) – Musician and music teacher
- Radim Smetana (Czech Republic) – Music editor
- Aida Kurtović (Slovenia) – Journalist and music editor for Radio Val 202

Semi-final – 24 January 2008
R/O	Artist	Song	Songwriter(s)	Result
1	Glen and Pamela	"Loved By You"	Paul Giordimaina, Fleur Balzan	—N/a
2	Claudia Faniello	"Caravaggio"	Ray Agius, Godwin Sant	Qualified
3	Eleanor Cassar	"Give Me a Chance"	Paul Giordimaina, Fleur Balzan	Qualified
4	Mary Spiteri	"My Last Encore"	Ray Agius, Godwin Sant	—N/a
5	Morena	"Casanova"	Philip Vella, Gerard James Borg	Qualified
6	Daniela Vella	"Throw Your Stones"	Philip Vella, Gerard James Borg	—N/a
7	Rosman Pace	"Love Is Just the Way"	Rosman Pace	Qualified
8	Klinsmann	"Go"	Dominic Galea, Claudette Pace	Qualified
9	Morena	"Vodka"	Philip Vella, Gerard James Borg	Qualified
10	Pamela	"Whispers"	Paul Giordimaina, Fleur Balzan	—N/a
11	Klinsmann	"Superhero"	Philip Vella, Gerard James Borg	—N/a
12	Jean Claude Vancell	"Contradiction"	Jean Claude Vancell	—N/a
13	Chris and Moira	"All Right Now"	Chris Scicluna, Moira Stafrace	—N/a
14	Jessica Muscat	"Tangled"	Philip Vella, Gerard James Borg	—N/a
15	Mary Spiteri	"If You Believe"	Paul Abela, Raymond Mahoney	—N/a
16	Petra Zammit	"Street Car of Desire"	Elton Zarb, Rita Pace	Qualified
17	Claudia Faniello	"Sunrise"	Ray Agius	Qualified

==== Final ====
The final took place on 26 January 2008. The eight entries that qualified from the semi-final were performed again and the combination of votes from public televoting (4/5) and a five-member jury panel (1/5) determined the winner. The show was opened with a guest performance of "Vertigo" and "Heaven" by Olivia Lewis (who represented Malta in 2007), while the interval act featured performances by Chiara, Mike Spiteri (who represented Malta in 1995), and Australian Idol 2007 winner Natalie Gauci. After the votes from the jury panel and televote were combined, "Vodka" performed by Morena was the winner. The five members of the jury that evaluated the entries during the final consisted of Joe Cutajar, Frederick Zammit, Eric Montfort, Robert Azzopardi, and Christa Caruana.

Final – 26 January 2008
R/O	Artist	Song	Jury		Televote		Total	Place
R/O	Artist	Song	Votes	Points	Votes	Points	Total	Place
1	Eleanor Cassar	"Give Me a Chance"	49	10	3,821	40	50	4
2	Claudia Faniello	"Caravaggio"	49	12	12,714	56	68	2
3	Petra Zammit	"Street Car of Desire"	39	4	3,421	24	28	6
4	Morena	"Casanova"	40	6	3,607	32	38	5
5	Klinsmann	"Go"	43	8	3,299	16	24	7
6	Claudia Faniello	"Sunrise"	71	16	4,518	48	64	3
7	Rosman Pace	"Love Is Just the Way"	36	2	3,253	8	10	8
8	Morena	"Vodka"	49	14	16,979	64	78	1

=== Promotion ===
Prior to the contest, Morena specifically promoted "Vodka" as the Maltese Eurovision entry on 25 April 2008 by performing during the UKEurovision Preview Party event which was held at the Scala venue in London, United Kingdom, and hosted by Paddy O'Connell.

== At Eurovision ==
The Eurovision Song Contest 2008 took place at the Belgrade Arena in Belgrade, Serbia and consisted of two semi-finals for the first time on 20 and 22 May, and the final of 24 May 2008. According to Eurovision rules, all nations with the exceptions of the host country and the "Big Four" (France, Germany, Spain, and the United Kingdom) are required to qualify from one of two semi-finals in order to compete for the final; the top nine songs from each semi-final as determined by televoting progress to the final, and a tenth was determined by back-up juries. The European Broadcasting Union (EBU) split up the competing countries into six different pots based on voting patterns from previous contests, with countries with favourable voting histories put into the same pot. On 28 January 2008, an allocation draw was held which placed each country into one of the two semi-finals. Malta was placed into the second semi-final, to be held on 22 May 2008. The running order for the semi-finals was decided through another draw on 17 March 2008 and Malta was set to perform in position 16, following the entry from Hungary and before the entry from Cyprus.

The two semi-finals and the final were broadcast in Malta on TVM with commentary by Eileen Montesin. TVM appointed Moira Delia as its spokesperson to announce the Maltese votes during the final.

=== Semi-final ===
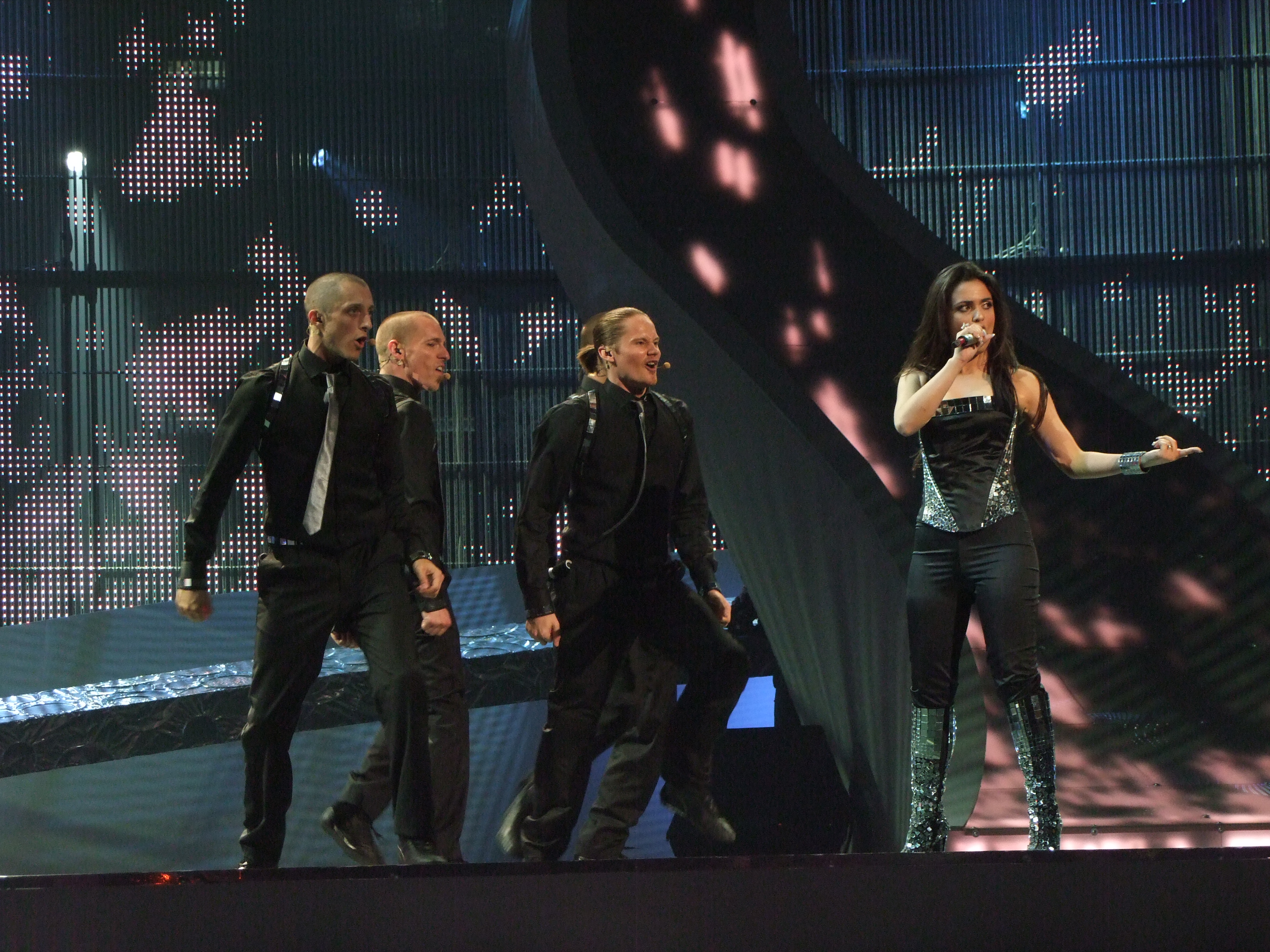
Morena during a rehearsal before the second semi-final

Morena took part in technical rehearsals on 14 and 18 May, followed by dress rehearsals on 21 and 22 May. The Maltese performance featured Morena wearing high-heeled long boots with small mirrors and a black outfit with silver and black glitter, designed by Maltese designer Ernest Camilleri, and performing together with four dancers. Morena was joined by a backing vocalist on stage: Anabelle Debono. The dancers featured during the performance were Dan Gill, Markus Englund, Nicklas Berglund and Thomas Benstem.

At the end of the show, Malta was not announced among the top 10 entries in the second semi-final and therefore failed to qualify to compete in the final. It was later revealed that Malta placed fourteenth in the semi-final, receiving a total of 38 points.

=== Voting ===
Below is a breakdown of points awarded to Malta and awarded by Malta in the second semi-final and grand final of the contest. The nation awarded its 12 points to Switzerland in the semi-final and to Sweden in the final of the contest.

==== Points awarded to Malta ====
Points awarded to Malta (Semi-final 2)
Score	Country
12 points	
10 points	
8 points	Albania
7 points	
6 points	Czech Republic
5 points	
4 points	Croatia; Denmark; Latvia; Portugal
3 points	Bulgaria; Iceland
2 points	United Kingdom
1 point	

==== Points awarded by Malta ====
Points awarded by Malta (Semi-final 2)
Score	Country
12 points	Switzerland
10 points	Georgia
8 points	Ukraine
7 points	Sweden
6 points	Latvia
5 points	Iceland
4 points	Denmark
3 points	Portugal
2 points	Bulgaria
1 point	Czech Republic

Points awarded by Malta (Final)
Score	Country
12 points	Sweden
10 points	Ukraine
8 points	Russia
7 points	Latvia
6 points	Iceland
5 points	Georgia
4 points	Denmark
3 points	Norway
2 points	Greece
1 point	Serbia
