= Malta in the Eurovision Song Contest 2017 =

- Eurovision Song Contest 2017
- Participating broadcaster: Public Broadcasting Services (PBS)
- Country: Malta
- Selection process: Malta Eurovision Song Contest 2017
- Selection date: 18 February 2017

Competing entry
- Song: "Breathlessly"
- Artist: Claudia Faniello
- Songwriters: Philip Vella; Sean Vella; Gerard James Borg

Placement
- Semi-final result: Failed to qualify (16th)

Participation chronology

Malta was represented at the Eurovision Song Contest 2017 with the song "Breathlessly", written by Philip Vella, Sean Vella and Gerard James Borg, and performed by Claudia Faniello. The Maltese participating broadcaster, Public Broadcasting Services (PBS), selected its entry for the contest through the national final Malta Eurovision Song Contest 2017. The competition consisted of a final, held on 18 February 2017, where "Breathlessly" performed by Claudia Faniello eventually emerged as the winning entry after gaining 26% of the public televote.

Malta was drawn to compete in the second semi-final of the Eurovision Song Contest which took place on 11 May 2017. Performing during the show in position 4, "Breathlessly" was not announced among the top 10 entries of the second semi-final and therefore did not qualify to compete in the final on 13 May. It was later revealed that Malta placed sixteenth out of the 18 participating countries in the semi-final with 55 points.

== Background ==
Prior to the 2017 contest, the Maltese Broadcasting Authority (MBA) until 1975, and the Public Broadcasting Services (PBS) since 1991, have participated in the Eurovision Song Contest representing Malta twenty-nine times since MBA's first entry in 1971. MBA briefly competed in the contest in the 1970s before withdrawing for sixteen years, while PBS competed in every contest since their return in 1991. Their best placing thus far was second, achieved on two occasions: 2002 with the song "7th Wonder" performed by Ira Losco, and in 2005 with the song "Angel" performed by Chiara. In 2016, "Walk on Water" performed by Ira Losco qualified to the final and placed 12th.

As part of its duties as participating broadcaster, PBS organises the selection of its entry in the Eurovision Song Contest and broadcasts the event in the country. The broadcaster confirmed its intentions to participate in the 2017 contest on 17 August 2016. The broadcaster selected its entry consistently through a national final procedure, a method that was continued for its 2017 participation.

== Before Eurovision ==
=== Malta Eurovision Song Contest 2017 ===
Malta Eurovision Song Contest 2017 was the national final format developed by PBS to select the Maltese entry for the Eurovision Song Contest 2017. The competition consisted of a final held on 18 February 2017 at the Malta Fairs & Conventions Centre in Ta' Qali, hosted by Daniel Azzopardi and Charlene Mercieca and broadcast on Television Malta (TVM) as well as on the broadcaster's website tvm.com.mt.

==== Competing entries ====
Artists and composers were able to submit their entries on 30 November 2016 to the PBS Creativity Hub in Gwardamanġa. Songwriters from any nationality were able to submit songs as long as the artist were Maltese or possessed Maltese citizenship. Artists were able to submit as many songs as they wished, however, they could only compete with a maximum of one in the final. 2016 national final winner Ira Losco was unable to compete due to a rule that prevented the previous winner from competing in the following competition. 156 entries were received by the broadcaster. On 12 December 2016, PBS announced a shortlist of 60 entries that had progressed through the selection process. The sixteen songs selected to compete in the competition were announced on 21 December 2016. Among the selected competing artists was former Maltese Eurovision entrant Richard Edwards who represented Malta in the 2014 contest as part of the group Firelight.

==== Final ====
The final took place on 18 February 2017. Sixteen entries competed and the winner was determined solely by a public televote. The interval act of the show featured performances by the 2016 Maltese Eurovision entrant Ira Losco, the 2016 Maltese Junior Eurovision entrant Christina Magrin and the local band The Travellers. After the results of the public televote were announced, "Breathlessly" performed by Claudia Faniello was the winner.

Final – 18 February 2017
R/O	Artist	Song	Songwriter(s)	Televote	Place
1	Klinsmann Coleiro	"Laserlight"	Dreher Emanuel, Stefan Moessle, Mathias Strasser	332	10
2	Raquela Dalli Gonzi	"Ray of Light"	Boris Cezek, Dean Muscat	551	8
3	Deborah C and Josef	"Tonight"	Jonas Gladnikoff, Primož Poglajen, Michael James Down, Sara Ljunggren, Angie Laus	572	7
4	Kevin Borg	"Follow"	Kevin Borg, Simon Gribbe	2,502	3
5	Jade Vella	"Seconds Away"	Kevin Borg, Simon Gribbe	166	14
6	Crosswalk	"So Simple"	Boris Cezek, Dean Muscat	245	12
7	Franklin Calleja	"Follow Me"	Ivan Grech, Cyprian Cassar, Muxu	1,303	5
8	Rhiannon	"Fearless"	Cyprian Cassar, Rhiannon Micallef	288	11
9	Miriana Conte	"Don't Look Down"	Cyprian Cassar, Muxu	156	16
10	Shauna Vassallo	"Crazy Games"	Cyprian Cassar, Muxu	159	15
11	Janice Mangion	"Kewkba"	Mark Scicluna, Emil Calleja Bayliss	4,544	2
12	Cherton Caruana	"Fighting to Survive"	Boris Cezek, Dean Muscat	340	9
13	Maxine Pace	"Bombshell"	Noel Cohen, Michael Macallister, Julie Hardy, Erin Bowman	627	6
14	Richard Edwards	"You"	Richard Micallef	186	13
15	Brooke Borg	"Unstoppable"	Christian Schneider, Aidan O'Connor, Sara Biglert, Brooke Borg	2,000	4
16	Claudia Faniello	"Breathlessly"	Philip Vella, Sean Vella, Gerard James Borg	4,996	1

=== Promotion ===
Claudia Faniello made several appearances across Europe to specifically promote "Breathlessly" as the Maltese Eurovision entry. On 2 April, Faniello performed during the London Eurovision Party, which was held at the Café de Paris venue in London, United Kingdom and hosted by Nicki French. Between 3 and 6 April, she took part in promotional activities in Tel Aviv, Israel where she performed during the Israel Calling event held at the Ha'teatron venue. On 8 April, Claudia Faniello performed during the Eurovision in Concert event which was held at the Melkweg venue in Amsterdam, Netherlands and hosted by Cornald Maas and Selma Björnsdóttir.

== At Eurovision ==
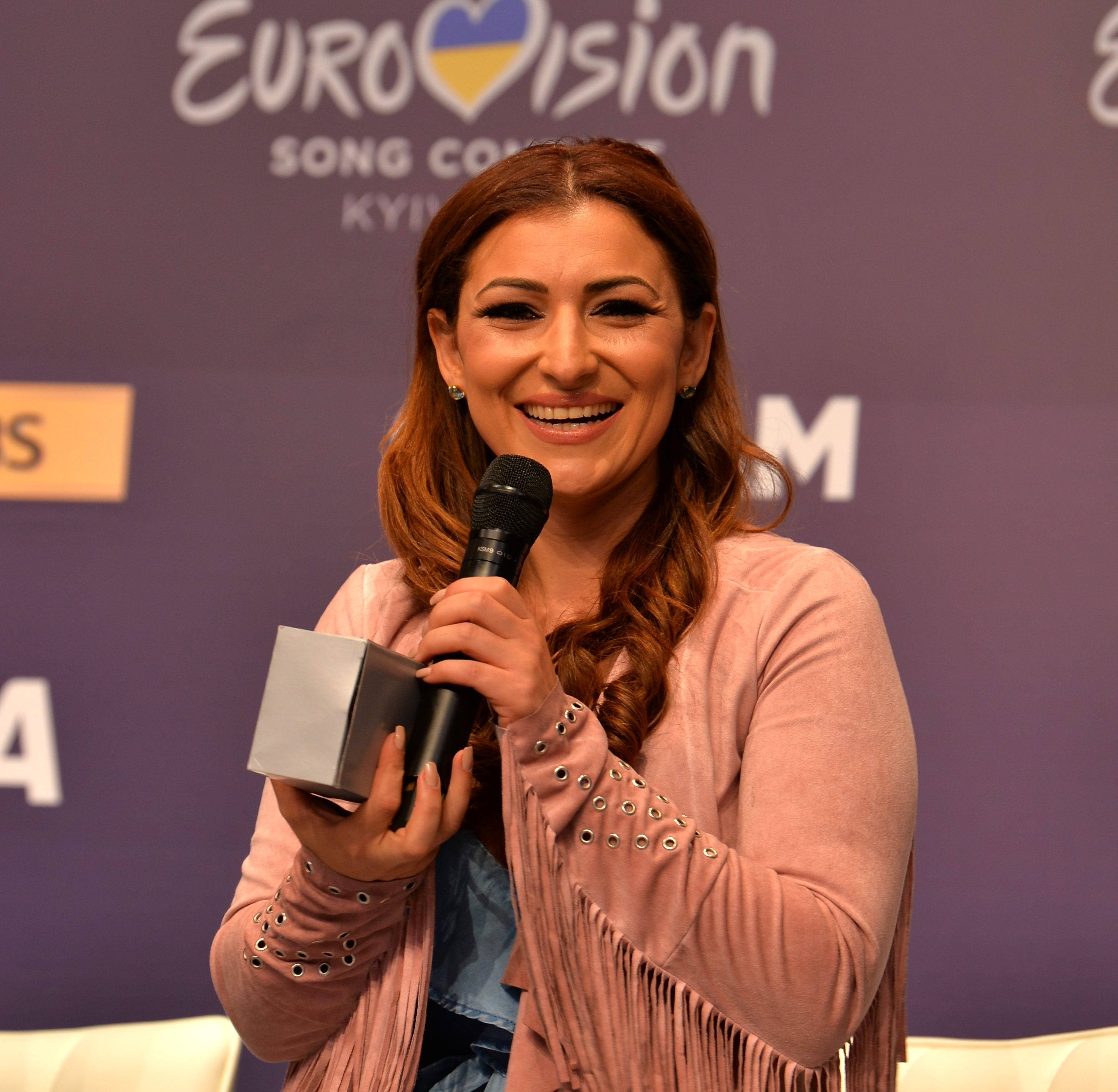
Claudia Faniello during a press meet and greet

The Eurovision Song Contest 2017 took place at the International Exhibition Centre in Kyiv, Ukraine and consisted of two semi-finals on 9 and 11 May, and the final of 13 May 2017. According to Eurovision rules, all nations with the exceptions of the host country and the "Big Five" (France, Germany, Italy, Spain and the United Kingdom) are required to qualify from one of two semi-finals in order to compete for the final; the top ten countries from each semi-final progress to the final. The European Broadcasting Union (EBU) split up the competing countries into six different pots based on voting patterns from previous contests, with countries with favourable voting histories put into the same pot. On 31 January 2017, an allocation draw was held which placed each country into one of the two semi-finals, as well as which half of the show they would perform in. Malta was placed into the first semi-final, to be held on 11 May 2017, and was scheduled to perform in the first half of the show.

Once all the competing songs for the 2017 contest had been released, the running order for the semi-finals was decided by the shows' producers rather than through another draw, so that similar songs were not placed next to each other. Originally, Malta was set to perform in position 5, following the entry from Macedonia and before the entry from Romania, however following Russia's withdrawal from the contest on 13 April and subsequent removal from the running order of the second semi-final, Malta's performing position shifted to 4.

The two semi-finals and the final were broadcast in Malta on TVM. The Maltese spokesperson, who announced the top 12 Points awarded by the Maltese jury during the final, was Martha Fenech.

=== Semi-final ===
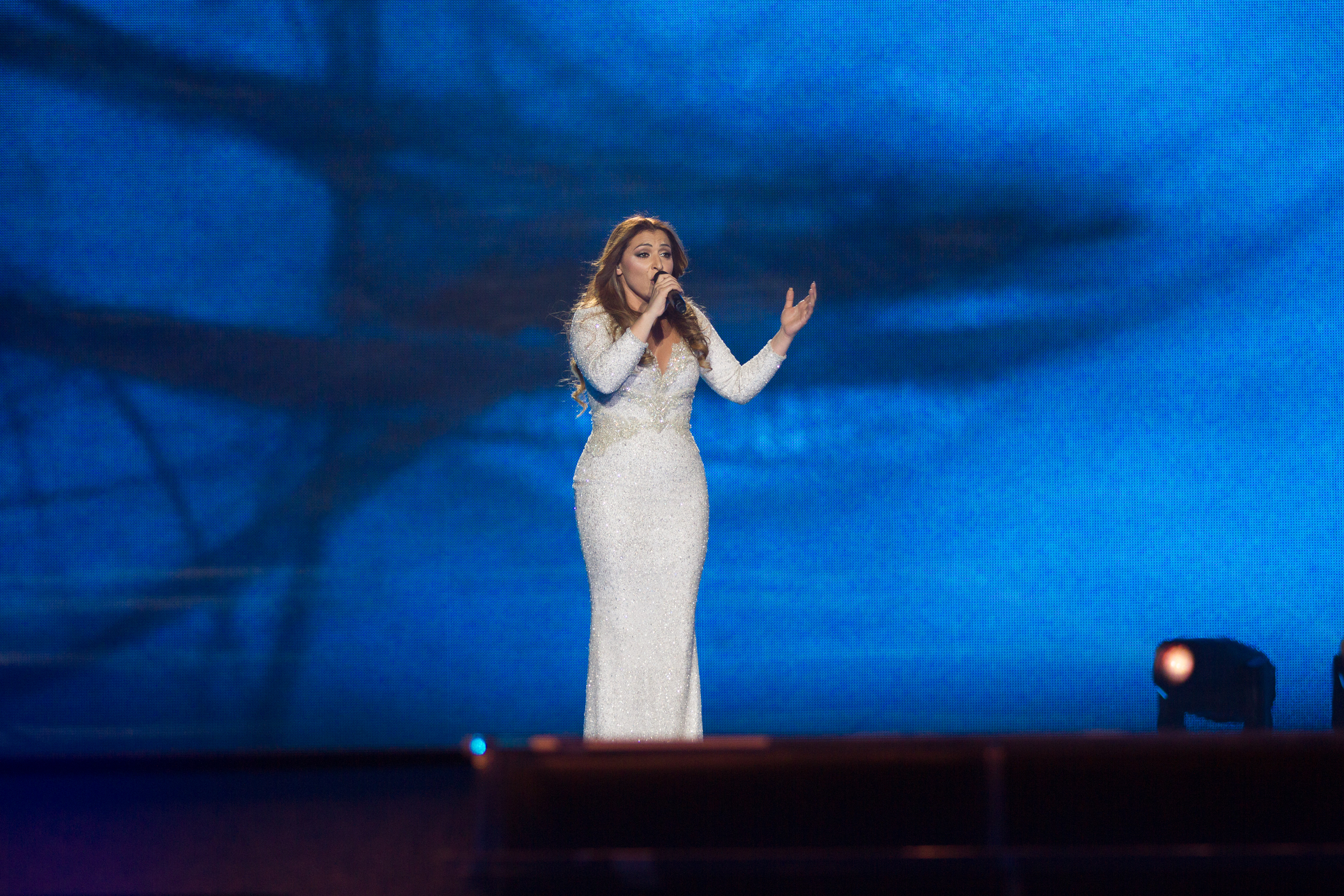
Claudia Faniello during a rehearsal before the second semi-final

Claudia Faniello took part in technical rehearsals on 2 and 5 May, followed by dress rehearsals on 10 and 11 May. This included the jury show on 10 May where the professional juries of each country watched and voted on the competing entries.

The Maltese performance featured Claudia Faniello wearing a glittery silver full-length tight-fitting formal dress, taking inspiration from her music video for "Breathlessly". The LED backdrops were mostly dark blue where Faniello appeared on the LED backdrop, sometimes with just a close-up of her face and sometimes with a full body shot. The chandelier was prominent, which was also taking inspiration from the setting of the music video. Claudia Faniello was joined by four off-stage backing vocalists: Chantal Hartmann, Hannah Köpf, Janina Krömer and Jeannette Marchewka.

At the end of the show, Malta was not announced as having finished in the top 10 and did not qualify for the grand final. It was later revealed that Malta placed sixteenth in the semi-final, receiving a total of 55 points: 0 points from the televoting and 55 points from the juries.

=== Voting ===
Voting during the three shows involved each country awarding two sets of points from 1–8, 10 and 12: one from their professional jury and the other from televoting. Each nation's jury consisted of five music industry professionals who are citizens of the country they represent, with their names published before the contest to ensure transparency. This jury judged each entry based on: vocal capacity; the stage performance; the song's composition and originality; and the overall impression by the act. In addition, no member of a national jury was permitted to be related in any way to any of the competing acts in such a way that they cannot vote impartially and independently. The individual rankings of each jury member as well as the nation's televoting results were released shortly after the grand final.

Below is a breakdown of points awarded to Malta and awarded by Malta in the second semi-final and grand final of the contest, and the breakdown of the jury voting and televoting conducted during the two shows:

==== Points awarded to Malta ====
Points awarded to Malta (Semi-final 2)
Score	Televote	Jury
12 points		
10 points		
8 points		Macedonia
7 points		Bulgaria
6 points		Austria; France
5 points		Belarus; Ireland
4 points		Estonia
3 points		Germany; Netherlands
2 points		Israel; Serbia
1 point		Croatia; Lithuania; Romania; San Marino

==== Points awarded by Malta ====
Points awarded by Malta (Semi-final 2)
Score	Televote	Jury
12 points	Bulgaria	Bulgaria
10 points	Israel	Israel
8 points	Croatia	Macedonia
7 points	Romania	Belarus
6 points	Hungary	Netherlands
5 points	Switzerland	Denmark
4 points	Ireland	Romania
3 points	Netherlands	Estonia
2 points	Estonia	Serbia
1 point	Austria	Ireland

Points awarded by Malta (Final)
Score	Televote	Jury
12 points	Italy	Italy
10 points	Bulgaria	Portugal
8 points	Portugal	Bulgaria
7 points	Sweden	Israel
6 points	Romania	Croatia
5 points	Belgium	Romania
4 points	United Kingdom	France
3 points	Croatia	Hungary
2 points	Hungary	Belarus
1 point	Moldova	Armenia

==== Detailed voting results ====
The following members comprised the Maltese jury:

- Kevin Abela (jury chairperson) – principal of the Trumpet Malta Philharmonic Orchestra
- Whitney Cremona – singer
- Karl Bonaci – TV director
- Chiara Siracusa – singer, represented Malta in the 1998, 2005 and 2009 contests
- Mark Spiteri Lucas – teacher, musician, band leader, songwriter, arranger

Detailed voting results from Malta (Semi-final 2)
R/O	Country	Jury							Televote	
R/O	Country	K. Abela	W. Cremona	K. Bonaci	C. Siracusa	M. Spiteri Lucas	Rank	Points	Rank	Points
01	Serbia	13	6	9	12	11	9	2	15	
02	Austria	16	13	13	5	13	13		10	1
03	Macedonia	4	3	3	1	4	3	8	12	
04	Malta									
05	Romania	10	12	7	6	6	7	4	4	7
06	Netherlands	7	10	6	4	7	5	6	8	3
07	Hungary	17	15	12	13	14	17		5	6
08	Denmark	6	5	8	8	12	6	5	13	
09	Ireland	15	11	15	7	5	10	1	7	4
10	San Marino	14	17	4	16	16	15		14	
11	Croatia	5	16	16	14	9	12		3	8
12	Norway	8	8	17	17	10	14		11	
13	Switzerland	12	9	14	9	15	11		6	5
14	Belarus	1	2	5	11	2	4	7	16	
15	Bulgaria	3	1	2	2	1	1	12	1	12
16	Lithuania	11	14	11	15	17	16		17	
17	Estonia	9	7	10	10	8	8	3	9	2
18	Israel	2	4	1	3	3	2	10	2	10

Detailed voting results from Malta (Final)
R/O	Country	Jury							Televote	
R/O	Country	K. Abela	W. Cremona	K. Bonaci	C. Siracusa	M. Spiteri Lucas	Rank	Points	Rank	Points
01	Israel	9	2	3	4	11	4	7	17	
02	Poland	14	21	10	21	25	18		15	
03	Belarus	6	6	9	19	6	9	2	24	
04	Austria	10	15	16	9	12	12		11	
05	Armenia	4	13	17	8	9	10	1	25	
06	Netherlands	12	14	22	12	10	15		12	
07	Moldova	15	7	8	5	21	11		10	1
08	Hungary	11	11	11	2	8	8	3	9	2
09	Italy	1	1	1	6	1	1	12	1	12
10	Denmark	16	9	12	16	15	14		19	
11	Portugal	5	10	4	3	2	2	10	3	8
12	Azerbaijan	17	23	26	22	26	25		21	
13	Croatia	2	12	2	10	3	5	6	8	3
14	Australia	25	20	21	23	20	22		16	
15	Greece	26	22	18	13	23	21		18	
16	Spain	23	26	20	20	24	24		26	
17	Norway	22	16	23	24	14	20		14	
18	United Kingdom	20	18	19	17	19	19		7	4
19	Cyprus	21	17	7	14	16	17		20	
20	Romania	8	3	6	11	7	6	5	5	6
21	Germany	13	19	13	15	13	16		23	
22	Ukraine	18	25	24	26	18	23		22	
23	Belgium	24	24	25	25	22	26		6	5
24	Sweden	19	8	14	7	17	13		4	7
25	Bulgaria	3	4	15	1	4	3	8	2	10
26	France	7	5	5	18	5	7	4	13	
