= Gerard James Borg =

Maltese songwriter

Gerard James Borg is a Maltese songwriter, author, and concept creator. He is well known for writing multiple songs that competed in the Eurovision Song Contest.

Borg has written six of the Maltese entries for the annual Eurovision Song Contest with composer Philip Vella. Their song "7th Wonder" sung by Ira Losco gave Malta 2nd place in the contest. This was the first time Malta reached 2nd place and it is the country's best result in the contest so far, alongside the 2nd place earned by Chiara with the song "Angel" in 2005. Borg and Vella also penned the song "Reaching Higher" as the official theme for the 2003 Games of the Small States of Europe which were held in Malta that year. Some of their compositions have also done well in foreign charts.

Borg has also co-written the song "Shine" which represented Russia in the 2014 Eurovision Song Contest and wrote songs for several national finals in other countries which include France, Norway, The Netherlands, Belgium, Greece, Iceland, Bulgaria, and Romania.

Borg has also written blog-style articles for the Times of Malta, and been interviewed for the Maltese newspaper by journalist Ramona Depares. Some of his fashion designs appeared on the front cover of German fashion publication Burda.

== Eurovision Song Contest ==
=== Eurovision Song Contest entries ===
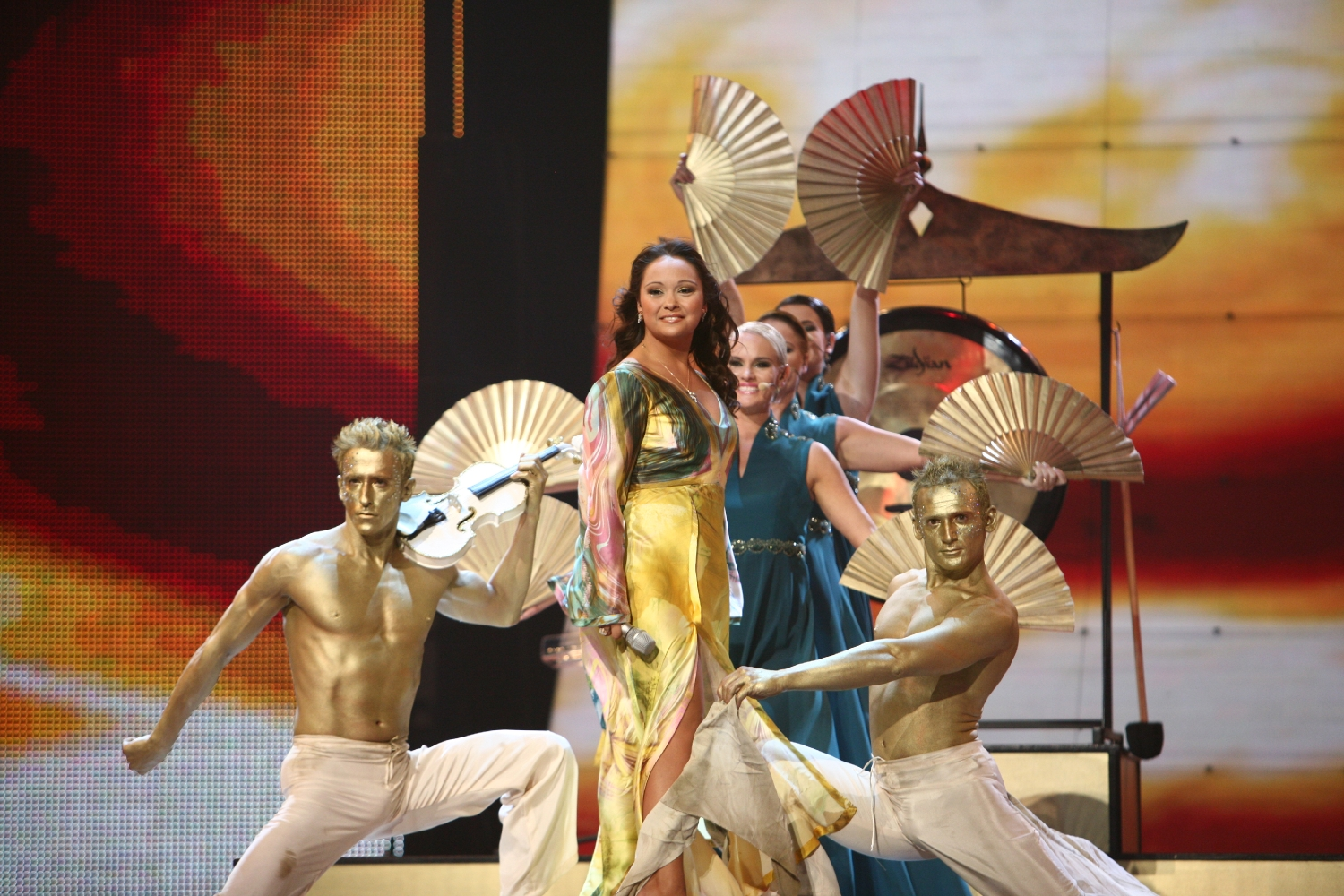
Vertigo dress rehearsal in Helsinki 2007

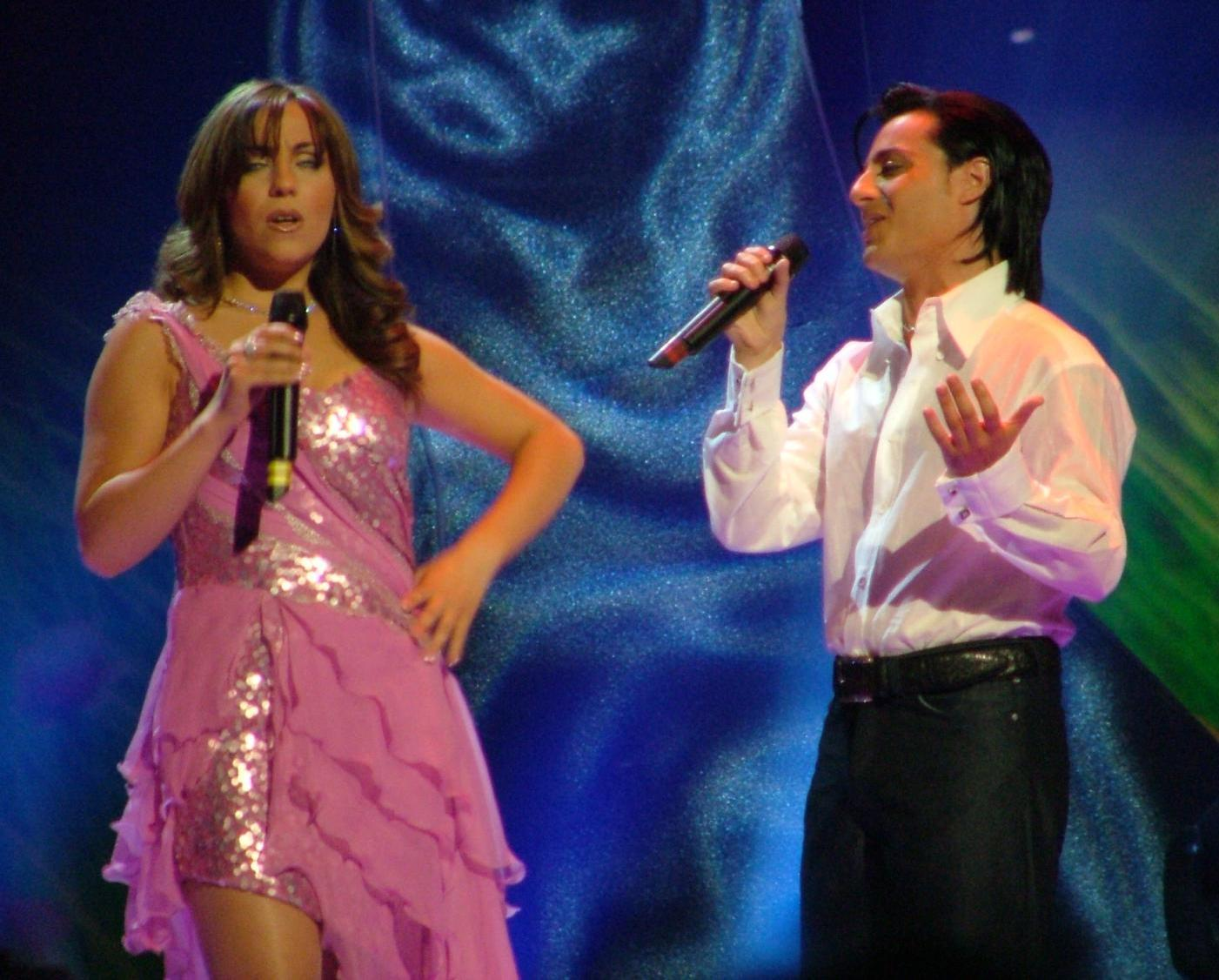
Julie and Ludwig performing "On Again... Off Again" at Istanbul (2004)

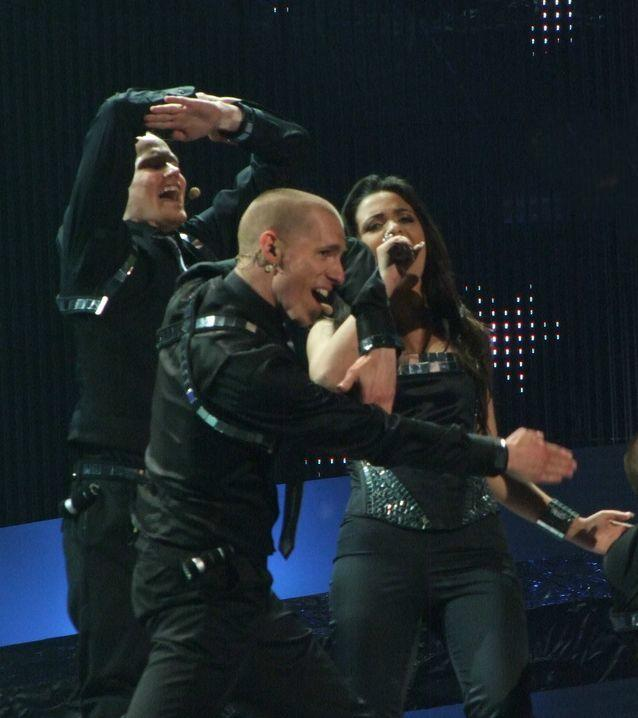
Morena performing "Vodka" at Belgrade (2008)

- Desire by Claudette Pace (Malta 2000)
- 7th Wonder by Ira Losco (Malta 2002)
- On Again... Off Again by Julie & Ludwig (Malta 2004)
- Vertigo by Olivia Lewis (Malta 2007)
- Vodka by Morena (Malta 2008)
- Shine by Tolmachevy Twins (Russia 2014)
- Breathlessly by Claudia Faniello (Malta 2017)

=== National final entries ===
| Country | Contest | Year | Song | Artists | Placing | Sources |
|---|---|---|---|---|---|---|
| Belgium | Eurosong | 2006 | Beyond You | Vanessa Chinitor | 7th place in Quarterfinal | |
| Belgium | Eurosong | 2008 | Décadance | Femme Fatale | 3rd place in Quarterfinal | |
| Bulgaria | EuroBGVision 2006 | 2006 | Wish | Neda Karova and Da | 8th place | |
| France | Les chansons d'abord | 2014 | Ma liberté | Joanna | unknown whether 2nd or 3rd in the final | |
| Greece | Ellinikós Telikós 2011 | 2011 | It's All Greek To Me | Antigoni Psihrami | 4th place | |
| Iceland | Söngvakeppni Sjónvarpsins | 2008 | I Wanna Manicure | Hara Sisters | eliminated before the final | |
| Iceland | Söngvakeppni Sjónvarpsins | 2011 | Ég trúi à betra líf | Magni Ásgeirsson | 2nd place | |
| Malta | Malta Song for Europe | 1999 | Breathless | Claudette Pace | 5th place | |
| Malta | Malta Song for Europe | 2000 | Shine | Ira Losco | 6th place | |
| Malta | Malta Song for Europe | 2000 | Desire | Claudette Pace | 1st place (8th at ESC 2000) | |
| Malta | Malta Song for Europe | 2001 | Spellbound | Ira Losco | 2nd place | |
| Malta | Malta Song for Europe | 2002 | Dazzle Me | Paula | 5th place | |
| Malta | Malta Song for Europe | 2002 | 7th Wonder | Ira Losco | 1st place (2nd at ESC 2002) | |
| Malta | Malta Song for Europe | 2003 | Superstitious | Natasha & Charlene | 5th place | |
| Malta | Malta Song for Europe | 2004 | Tango 4 Two | Keith Camilleri | 6th place | |
| Malta | Malta Song for Europe | 2004 | On Again... Off Again | Julie & Ludwig | 1st place (12th at ESC 2004) | |
| Malta | Malta Song for Europe | 2005 | Déjà vu | Olivia Lewis | 2nd place | |
| Malta | Malta Song for Europe | 2006 | Amazing | AnnaBelle | 14th place | |
| Malta | Malta Song for Europe | 2007 | My Love | Isabelle Zammit | 10th place in Semifinal | |
| Malta | Malta Song for Europe | 2007 | Night Wish | AnnaBelle | 12th place in Semifinal | |
| Malta | Malta Song for Europe | 2007 | Vertigo | Olivia Lewis | 1st place (25th in semifinal at ESC 2007) | |
| Malta | Malta Song for Europe | 2008 | Tangled | Jessica Muscat | eliminated in Semifinal | |
| Malta | Malta Song for Europe | 2008 | Throw Your Stones | Daniela Vella | eliminated in Semifinal | |
| Malta | Malta Song for Europe | 2008 | Superhero | Klinsmann | eliminated in Semifinal | |
| Malta | Malta Song for Europe | 2008 | Casanova | Morena | 5th place | |
| Malta | Malta Song for Europe | 2008 | Vodka | Morena | 1st place (14th in semifinal at ESC 2008) | |
| Malta | GO Malta EuroSong | 2009 | Kamikaze Lover | Baklava | 18th place | |
| Malta | GO Malta EuroSong | 2009 | Typical Me | Alison Ellul | 8th place | |
| Malta | GO Malta EuroSong | 2009 | Crossroads | Raquela | 11th place | |
| Malta | GO Malta EuroSong | 2010 | Fired Up | Foxy Federation | 18th place | |
| Malta | GO Malta EuroSong | 2010 | Samsara | Claudia Faniello | 8th place | |
| Malta | GO Malta EuroSong | 2010 | Three Little Words | Ruth Portelli | 8th place | |
| Malta | Malta Eurovision Song Contest | 2011 | Movie In My Mind | Claudia Faniello | 9th place | |
| Malta | Malta Eurovision Song Contest | 2011 | Love Me Like Your Money | Kelly Schembri | 15th place | |
| Malta | Malta Eurovision Song Contest | 2011 | Moondance | Baklava | 6th place | |
| Malta | Malta Eurovision Song Contest | 2011 | Heart Of Glass | Cherise | eliminated in Semifinal | |
| Malta | Malta Eurovision Song Contest | 2012 | Autobiography | Dorothy Bezzina | 8th place | |
| Malta | Malta Eurovision Song Contest | 2012 | DNA | Romina Mamo | eliminated in Semifinal | |
| Malta | Malta Eurovision Song Contest | 2012 | Pure | Claudia Faniello | 2nd place | |
| Malta | Malta Eurovision Song Contest | 2013 | Fall Like Rome | Richard Edwards | 13th place | |
| Malta | Malta Eurovision Song Contest | 2013 | Love-o-holic | Deborah C | 9th place | |
| Malta | Malta Eurovision Song Contest | 2013 | Loverdose | Melanie Zammit | eliminated in Semifinal | |
| Malta | Malta Eurovision Song Contest | 2013 | Starting From The End | Dorothy Bezzina | 15th place | |
| Malta | Malta Eurovision Song Contest | 2013 | The Remedy | Klinsmann Coleiro | eliminated in Semifinal | |
| Malta | Malta Eurovision Song Contest | 2013 | Ultraviolet | Jessika | 8th place | |
| Malta | Malta Eurovision Song Contest | 2013 | Overrated | Marilena | eliminated in Semifinal | |
| Malta | Malta Eurovision Song Contest | 2013 | Dress Rehearsal | Saska Hunt | withdrawn from competition | |
| Malta | Malta Eurovision Song Contest | 2014 | Hypnotica | Jessika | 8th place (Winner of Public Televote Award and TVM Award) | |
| Malta | Malta Eurovision Song Contest | 2014 | Invisible | Raquel Galdes | eliminated in Semifinal | |
| Malta | Malta Eurovision Song Contest | 2014 | Lovetricity | Christabelle Borg | 8th place | |
| Malta | Malta Eurovision Song Contest | 2014 | Oblivion | Chris Grech | 13th place | |
| Malta | Malta Eurovision Song Contest | 2015 | Fandango | Jessika | 9th place | |
| Malta | Malta Eurovision Song Contest | 2016 | The Flame | Jessika | 7th place | |
| Malta | Malta Eurovision Song Contest | 2017 | Breathlessly | Claudia Faniello | 1st place (16th in second semi-final at ESC 2017) | |
| Malta | Malta Eurovision Song Contest | 2022 | Aphrodisiac | Jessica Grech | eliminated in Semifinal | |
| Malta | Malta Eurovision Song Contest | 2022 | Electric Indigo | Baklava ft. Nicole | 15th place | |
| Malta | Malta Eurovision Song Contest | 2022 | Kaleidoscope | Jessica Muscat | 17th place | |
| The Netherlands | Nationaal Songfestival | 2003 | Heatwave | Ebonique | 4th place | |
| Norway | Melodi Grand Prix | 2005 | Velvet Blue | Kathrine Strugstad | 5th place | |
| Norway | Melodi Grand Prix | 2006 | Absolutely Fabulous | Queentastic | 3rd place | |
| Norway | Melodi Grand Prix | 2010 | Million Dollar Baby | Belinda Braza | eliminated in Semifinal | |
| Romania | Selecţia Naţională Eurovision | 2007 | Lovestruck | Indiggo | disqualified | |
| Romania | Selecţia Naţională Eurovision | 2012 | Girls Don't Cry | Ioana Bianca Anuta | 4th place | |
| Romania | Selecţia Naţională Eurovision | 2012 | The Best A Man Can Get | Lucian Oros | 9th place | |
| Russia | Kto? | 2014 | Shine | Tolmachevy Sisters | Chosen by internal selection after national contest was abandoned. (7th in ESC 2014) | |
| Spain | Destino Eurovisión | 2011 | Golden Cadillac | (no artist assigned) | eliminated in Song selection prior to Final | |

== Publications ==
Gerard James Borg has published 7 novels.

- Sliema Wives (2013)
- Madliena Married Men (2015)
- Bormla Babes: Behind the Scenes (2017)
- Tigné Point Bachelors (2019)
- Sliema Wives: The New Breed (2021)
- The Divorce Party (2024)
- The Perfect Husband (2026)

Borg's debut novel Sliema Wives is a local best seller and it peaked at number one after one week of its release. Part of the proceeds from the book were donated to local charity Puttinu Cares. Similarly, Madliena Married Men also reached the number one spot in the local bestseller list.
