= Malta in the Eurovision Song Contest 2007 =

- Eurovision Song Contest 2007
- Participating broadcaster: Public Broadcasting Services (PBS)
- Country: Malta
- Selection process: Malta Song for Europe 2007
- Selection date: 3 February 2007

Competing entry
- Song: "Vertigo"
- Artist: Olivia Lewis
- Songwriters: Philip Vella; Gerard James Borg

Placement
- Semi-final result: Failed to qualify (25th)

Participation chronology

Malta was represented at the Eurovision Song Contest 2007 with the song "Vertigo", composed by Philip Vella, with lyrics by Gerard James Borg, and performed by Olivia Lewis. The Maltese participating broadcaster, Public Broadcasting Services (PBS), selected its entry for the contest through Malta Song for Europe 2007. The competition consisted of two phases: Opportunity 2 and Malta Song for Europe 2007. In the final, held on 3 February 2007, "Vertigo" performed by Olivia Lewis eventually emerged as the winning entry after gaining the most votes from a public televote with 30,977 votes.

Malta competed in the semi-final of the Eurovision Song Contest which took place on 10 May 2007. Performing during the show in position 20, "Vertigo" was not announced among the top 10 entries of the semi-final and therefore did not qualify to compete in the final on 12 May. This marked the first time that Malta failed to qualify to the final of the Eurovision Song Contest from a semi-final since the introduction of semi-finals in 2004. It was later revealed that Malta placed twenty-fifth out of the 28 participating countries in the semi-final with 15 points.

== Background ==
Prior to the 2007 contest, the Maltese Broadcasting Authority (MBA) until 1975, and the Public Broadcasting Services (PBS) since 1991, had participated in the Eurovision Song Contest representing Malta nineteen times since MBA's first entry in 1971. After competing in 1975, Malta was absent from the contest beginning in 1976. The country had, to this point, competed in every contest since returning in 1991. Their best placing in the contest thus far was second, which it achieved on two occasions: in 2002 with the song "7th Wonder" performed by Ira Losco and in 2005 with the song "Angel" performed by Chiara. In 2006, Malta automatically qualified to the final and placed 24th (last) with the song "I Do" performed by Fabrizio Faniello.

As part of its duties as participating broadcaster, PBS organises the selection of its entry in the Eurovision Song Contest and broadcasts the event in the country. The broadcaster confirmed its intentions to participate in the 2007 contest on 4 September 2006. The Maltese broadcaster had selected its entry consistently through a national final procedure, a method that was continued for its 2007 participation.

== Before Eurovision ==
=== Opportunity 2 ===
Opportunity 2 was the first phase of the national final format developed by PBS to select its entry for the Eurovision Song Contest 2007. Artists that have never competed in Malta Song for Europe were able to submit their entries for the competition between 7 September 2006 and 13 October 2006. Fifteen songs were selected and announced on 24 October 2006. The fifteen songs competed in the semi-final which consisted of five shows between 4 November and 9 December 2006. Three songs were presented in each show and five entries qualified to compete in the final on 16 December 2006. All shows were broadcast during the programme Showtime on Television Malta (TVM), hosted by Moira Delia.

==== Semi-final ====
The semi-final took place over five shows between 4 November and 9 December 2006. Fifteen songs competed for five qualifying spots in the final. "Forever" performed by Dominic Cini was originally announced as one of the qualifiers but was ultimately replaced with the song "No Expiry Date" performed by Evita Magri as Cini was unable to perform in the final.

Semi-final – 4 November–9 December 2006
Broadcast	R/O	Artist	Song	Songwriter(s)	Result
4 November 2006	1	Cherise Attard	"Take My Hand"	Andrew Zahra, Paul Callus	—N/a
4 November 2006	2	Marilena Farrugia	"Life"	Marilena Farrugia	—N/a
4 November 2006	3	Ann Marie Ellul	"Shooting Star"	Elton Zarb, Rita Pace	—N/a
11 November 2006	1	Clifford Galea	"Rhapsody"	John David Zammit, Ray Mahoney	—N/a
11 November 2006	2	Lourdes Borg	"Listen to the Music"	Elton Zarb, Rita Pace	—N/a
11 November 2006	3	Isadora Debono	"Blind Faith"	Phyllisienne Brincat, Rita Pace	Qualified
18 November 2006	1	~~Dominic Cini~~	~~"Forever"~~	~~Dominic Cini, Rita Pace~~	Withdrew
18 November 2006	2	Kimberley Manicaro	"Till Dawn"	Charles Muscat, Vince Zammit	—N/a
18 November 2006	3	Evita Magri	"No Expiry Date"	Evita Magri	Qualified
25 November 2006	1	Caroline Stapley	"Not an Angel... Not a Devil"	Philip Vella, Gerard James Borg	Qualified
25 November 2006	2	Damian Barbara	"Blaze of Fire"	Clinton Paul	—N/a
25 November 2006	3	Jessica Magro	"Simply for Me"	Andrew Zammit, Joe Chircop	—N/a
9 December 2006	1	Derrick Schembri and Yanika Fava	"Come Away With Me"	Elton Zarb, Rita Pace	—N/a
9 December 2006	2	Mauro Kitcher	"Unite"	Augusto Cardinali, Giovann Attard	Qualified
9 December 2006	3	Julia Grima	"Ice Queen"	Mark Spiteri Lucas, Rita Pace	Qualified

==== Final ====
The final took place on 16 December 2006. The five entries that qualified from the semi-final were performed again and the votes of a jury panel (4/5) and the results of public televoting (1/5) determined the two spots for Malta Song for Europe 2007.

Final – 16 December 2006
R/O	Artist	Song	Result
1	Caroline Stapley	"Not an Angel... Not a Devil"	—N/a
2	Mauro Kitcher	"Unite"	Qualified
3	Julia Grima	"Ice Queen"	Qualified
4	Evita Magri	"No Expiry Date"	—N/a
5	Isadora Debono	"Blind Faith"	—N/a

=== Malta Song for Europe 2007 ===
Malta Song for Europe 2007 was the second phase of the national final format developed by PBS to select its entry for the Eurovision Song Contest 2007. The competition consisted of a semi-final and final held on 1 and 3 February 2007, respectively, at the Malta Fairs & Conventions Centre in Ta' Qali. Both shows were hosted by Stephanie Spiteri and J. Anvil and broadcast on Television Malta (TVM) as well as on the website di-ve.com.

==== Format ====
The competition consisted of sixteen songs, including the two songs that qualified from Opportunity 2, competing in the semi-final on 1 February 2007 where the top six entries qualified to compete in the final on 3 February 2007. Seven judges evaluated the songs during the semi-final and each judge had an equal stake in the result. The results of the public televote had a weighting equal to the total votes of the judges. In the final, the results were determined exclusively by public televoting.

==== Competing entries ====
Artists and composers were able to submit their entries between 4 September 2006 and 30 October 2006. Songwriters from any nationality were able to submit songs as long as entry applications from foreign songwriters were eligible in their country. Artists were required to be Maltese or possess Maltese citizenship and could submit as many songs as they wished, however, they could only compete with a maximum of one in the semi-final. 228 entries were received by the broadcaster. On 26 November 2006, PBS announced a shortlist of 35 entries that had progressed through the selection process. The fourteen songs selected to compete in the semi-final were announced on 9 December 2006. Among the selected competing artists was William Mangion, who represented Malta in 1993. The jury panel that selected the fourteen semi-finalists consisted of Ramon Galarza (Portugal), Alex Panayi (Greece), Veronica Mortensel (Denmark), Claus Storgaard (Denmark), Nicholas Graham (United Kingdom), Deni Lewis (United Kingdom) and Bruno Berberes (France).

==== Semi-final ====
The semi-final took place on 1 February 2007. Sixteen songs competed for six qualifying spots in the final. The running order for the semi-final was announced on 11 January 2007. The interval act featured guest performances by Mihai Trăistariu (who represented Romania in 2006), the Yada Dance Company and the local band Winter Moods. The seven members of the jury that evaluated the entries during the semi-final consisted of:

- Helle Henning (Denmark) – Singer-songwriter
- Trine Dansgaard (Denmark) – Singer and music teacher
- John Themis (United Kingdom) – Producer and composer
- Jan van Dijck (Netherlands) – Director of EMI publishing and composer
- Lia Vissi (Cyprus) – Singer-songwriter, represented Cyprus in 1985
- Savvas Savva (Cyprus) – Pianist and composer
- Victor Escudero (Spain) – Radio DJ

Semi-final – 1 February 2007
R/O	Artist	Song	Songwriter(s)	Percentage	Place
1	Kevin Borg	"Whenever"	Jason Paul Cassar, Sunny Aquilina	7%	4
2	Annabelle	"Nightwish"	Philip Vella, Gerard James Borg	3%	12
3	Tarcisio Barbara	"Places to Go"	Tarcisio Barbara, Vince Zammit	5%	7
4	Claudia Faniello	"L-imħabba għamja"	Aldo Spiteri, Trevor Fenech, Claudia Faniello	5%	7
5	Rosman Pace	"Rollercoaster Ride"	Rosman Pace	5%	7
6	Julia Grima	"Ice Queen"	Mark Spiteri Lucas, Rita Pace	3%	12
7	William Mangion	"Forever Mine"	Aldo Spiteri, Trevor Fenech	4%	10
8	Olivia Lewis	"Vertigo"	Philip Vella, Gerard James Borg	24%	1
9	Klinsmann Coleiro	"She Gives Me Wings"	Mark Spiteri Lucas, Rita Pace	9%	3
10	Julie Pomorsky	"Look at Me"	Philip Vella	2%	15
11	Daniela Delicata	"Little Islands in Your Heart"	Daniela Delicata	3%	12
12	Pamela	"All About a Life"	Paul Giordimaina, Fleur Balzan	7%	4
13	Scar	"As Long As You Know"	Konrad Pulѐ	7%	4
14	Isabelle Zammit	"My Love"	Philip Vella, Gerard James Borg	4%	10
15	Mauro Kitcher	"Unite"	Augusto Cardinali, Giovann Attard	1%	16
16	Trilogy	"Starlight"	Paul Abela, Joe Julian Farrugia	10%	2

==== Final ====
The final took place on 3 February 2007. The six entries that qualified from the semi-final were performed again and the winner was determined solely by a public televote. The show was opened with a guest performance of "I Do" by Fabrizio Faniello (who represented Malta in 2006) and the Yada Dance Company, while the interval act featured performances by Ruslana (who won Eurovision for Ukraine in 2004). After the results of the public televote were announced, "Vertigo" performed by Olivia Lewis was the winner.

Final – 3 February 2007
R/O	Artist	Song	Televote	Place
1	Kevin Borg	"Whenever"	4,365	4
2	Klinsmann Coleiro	"She Gives Me Wings"	7,550	3
3	Scar	"As Long as You Know"	2,103	6
4	Olivia Lewis	"Vertigo"	30,977	1
5	Pamela Bezzina	"All About a Life"	3,047	5
6	Trilogy	"Starlight"	7,647	2

=== Preparation ===
Following Lewis's win at the Malta Song for Europe 2007, PBS announced that "Vertigo" would undergo remastering for the Eurovision Song Contest. The revamped version was produced by Swedish production company G Songs in Stockholm. The release of the song's new version and official music video was announced on 9 March 2007 during the TVM talk show programme Xarabank. The music video for the song was filmed earlier in March at several places of Malta, including the St. Paul's Band Club in Rabat and at an old cemetery in Mdina.

=== Promotion ===
Olivia Lewis made several appearances across Europe to specifically promote "Vertigo" as the Maltese Eurovision entry. On 17 February, Olivia Lewis performed during the sixth show of the Spanish Eurovision national final, Misión Eurovisión 2007. On 23 February, she performed during the presentation show of the 2007 Cypriot Eurovision entry, Cyprus 12 Points, Chypre 12 Points. On 3 and 9 March, Lewis performed during the final of the Lithuanian and the Ukrainian Eurovision national finals, respectively. Olivia Lewis also completed promotional activities in Belarus following her performances in Spain, Cyprus, and Ukraine. Between 13 and 15 April, Lewis performed during the Songfestivalparty event which was held in Belgium at the D-Club and Popi Café venue in Antwerp and at the Le You venue in Brussels, as well as appearing during the RTL 4 programme Life & Cooking in the Netherlands.

== At Eurovision ==
The Eurovision Song Contest 2007 took place at the Hartwall Areena in Helsinki, Finland and consisted of a semi-final on 10 May and the final of 12 May 2007. According to Eurovision rules, all nations with the exceptions of the host country and the "Big Four" (France, Germany, Spain, and the United Kingdom) are required to qualify from the semi-final in order to compete for the final; the top ten countries from the semi-final progress to the final. On 12 March 2007, an allocation draw was held which determined the running order for the semi-final and Malta was set to perform in position 20, following the entry from Norway and before the entry from Andorra.

The semi-final and the final were broadcast in Malta on TVM with commentary by Antonia Micallef. PBS appointed Mireille Bonello as its spokesperson to announce the Maltese votes during the final.

=== Semi-final ===
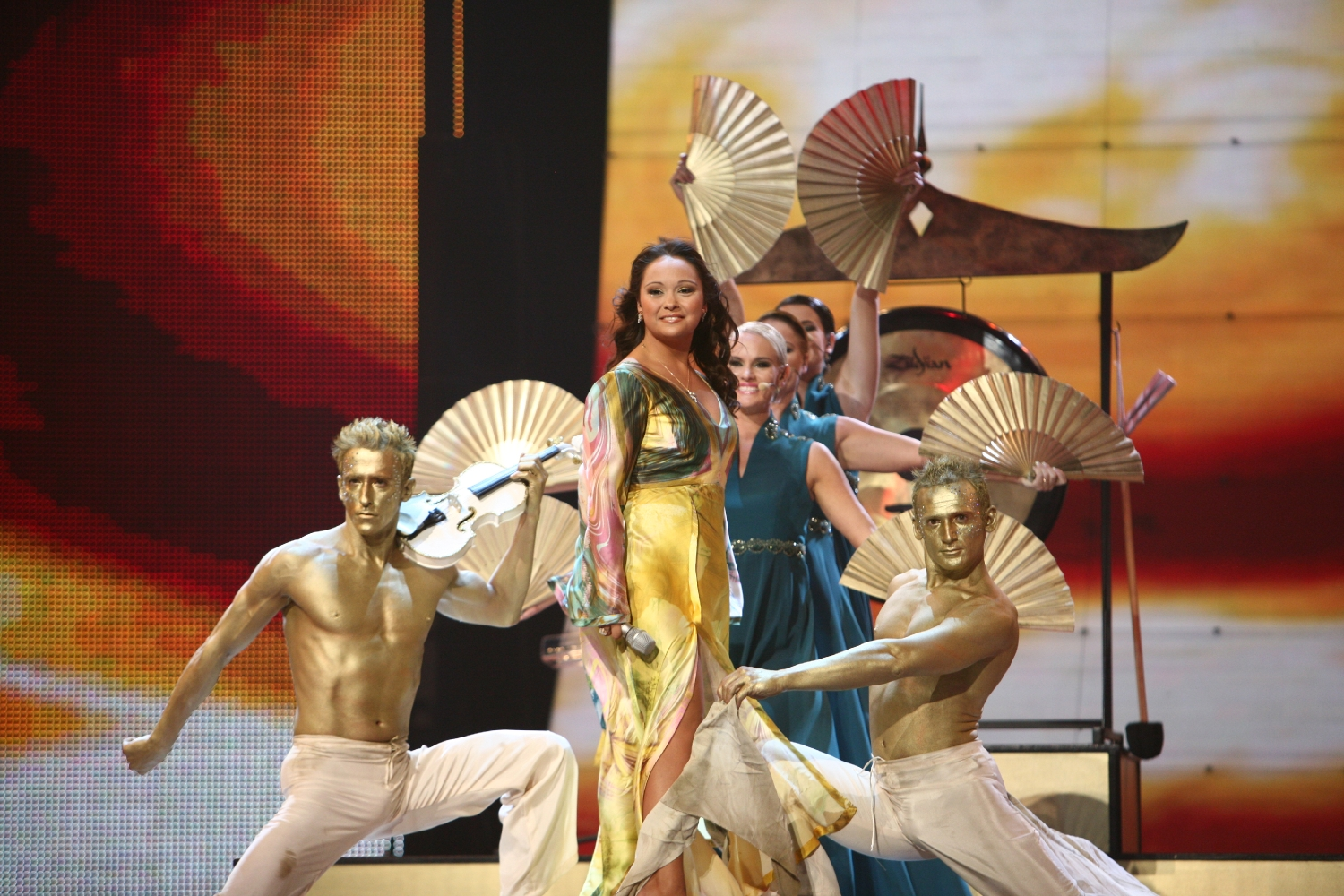
Olivia Lewis during a rehearsal before the semi-final

Olivia Lewis took part in technical rehearsals on 4 and 6 May, followed by dress rehearsals on 9 and 10 May. The Maltese performance featured Olivia Lewis wearing a yellow and blue Asian-styled dress and performing together with two dancers performing the violin and a golden gong, respectively, and three backing vocalists performing a fan routine behind Lewis and the dancers. The background LED screens projected white and red molten ultraviolet arcs of light spinning on an electric blue background. The performance also featured the use of wind machines. The creative director for the Maltese performance was Anna Christodoulidou. The backing vocalists that joined Olivia Lewis on stage were Jaana Vähämäki, Johanna Beijbom and Lisette Vega, while the dancers were Jes Sciberras and Joseph Chetcuti.

At the end of the show, Malta was not announced among the top 10 entries in the semi-final and therefore failed to qualify to compete in the final. This marked the first time that Malta failed to qualify to the final of the Eurovision Song Contest from the semi-final since the introduction of semi-finals in 2004. It was later revealed that Malta placed twenty-fifth in the semi-final, receiving a total of 15 points.

=== Voting ===
Below is a breakdown of points awarded to Malta and awarded by Malta in the semi-final and grand final of the contest. The nation awarded its 12 points to Latvia in the semi-final and to the United Kingdom in the final of the contest.

==== Points awarded to Malta ====
Points awarded to Malta (Semi-final)
Score	Country
12 points	
10 points	
8 points	
7 points	Turkey
6 points	Albania
5 points	
4 points	
3 points	
2 points	United Kingdom
1 point	

==== Points awarded by Malta ====
Points awarded by Malta (Semi-final)
Score	Country
12 points	Latvia
10 points	Switzerland
8 points	Netherlands
7 points	Belarus
6 points	Denmark
5 points	Slovenia
4 points	Hungary
3 points	Bulgaria
2 points	Norway
1 point	Serbia

Points awarded by Malta (Final)
Score	Country
12 points	United Kingdom
10 points	Belarus
8 points	Serbia
7 points	Bulgaria
6 points	Russia
5 points	Slovenia
4 points	Latvia
3 points	Ukraine
2 points	Spain
1 point	Hungary
