= Vodka (song) =

2008 song by Morena

Single by Morena
- Released: 2008
- Composer: Philip Vella
- Lyricist: Gerard James Borg

Eurovision Song Contest 2008 entry
- Country: Malta
- Artist: Margerita Camilleri Fenech
- As: Morena
- Language: English
- Composer: Philip Vella
- Lyricist: Gerard James Borg

Finals performance
- Semi-final result: 14th
- Semi-final points: 38

Entry chronology
- ◄ "Vertigo" (2007)
- "What If We" (2009) ►

Official performance video
- "Vodka" on YouTube

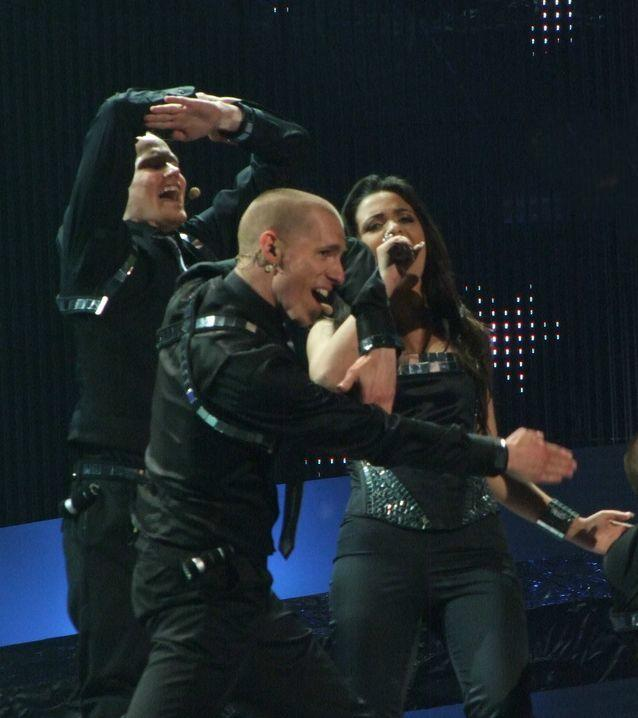
Morena at the Eurovision Song Contest

"Vodka" is a song recorded by Maltese singer Morena, composed by Philip Vella, with lyrics by Gerard James Borg. It represented Malta at the Eurovision Song Contest 2008, in Belgrade, Serbia..

Songwriters Borg and Vella have had written five song that represented Malta at the Eurovision Song Contest (2000, 2002, 2004, 2007 and 2008).

"Vodka" won the Malta Song for Europe 2008 with total 78 points (49 votes from the jury and 16,979 from the public). The jury gave the same (not maximal) number of points to two other songs, but public sympathies were on the side of "Vodka" to beat the runner-up by a wide margin.

The song speaks of a spy in Gorky Park in Moscow, "in a danger zone" where everywhere is "pitch dark". She is being chased because she deciphered the code which everyone wants so badly, and the word is "Vodka".

"Vodka" is sung in English, but starts with the word na zdarovye, a supposedly Russian word for "cheers!" toast. (Note: In fact, the toast similar to this one is Polish na zdrowie (literally "to health"). The similarly sounding Russian на здоровье (na zdorovye, "for health", in the meaning "to aid health", is used, e.g., as a polite reply in the following situation: someone treats you with food or drink, you say your thanks, and the treating person responds "for your health" (na zdorovye), i.e., "enjoy your meal/drink!" (other usages exist). The Russian toast is за здоровье (za zdorovye, "to health"), wishing health to someone and accordingly it always mentions whose health is being cheered, e.g., "to your health" or "to the health of the newlywed".) The song sparked comments that it was crafted to attract Eastern Europeans' votes, but the authors denied the accusations saying that the song was not even intended to enter the competition.

The song title is a source of numerous puns in newspaper titles, but Morena in her interview says she does not like vodka and in fact rarely drinks alcohol.

In the Eurovision Song Contest 2008, "Vodka" was sung in the 2nd semifinal on Thursday 22 May 2008, where it received 38 points and placed 14th in the semifinal, with Malta failing to qualify for the final for the second time.

The song was succeeded as Maltese representative at the 2009 contest by Chiara with "What If We".

== Music video ==
The music video features a spy team chasing down Morena in search for a "code", which is "vodka". Morena drops down from a rooftop to decipher the code, and leaves in the nick of time before a member of the spy team notices there is a breach. However, the code has already been fully transferred. Throughout the video, Morena is trying to escape the spy team chasing her down, using a motorcycle as her getaway vehicle. The team eventually corner her at a parking garage, kidnap her and take her in for questioning. While being questioned, a door opens to reveal a team who fights the team and unties Morena to save her. Morena runs to her escape, only to realize the only way out is through a massive cliff. Hesitantly, and while an attacker is chasing her she jumps into the water below, and swims to a plane parked in the water to her safety.

== In popular culture ==
The comedy team Zoo would make a spoof music video of "Vodka", with the music video being shown on TVM, a Maltese TV station. The music video shows many spoofs, including the hacker in the video playing Tetris and getting his head beat by another worker, Morena struggling with the rope pulling her, a look alike of Morena, Morena escaping by a bicycle while being chased by a taxi, and the spy team seeming like they do not know what they are doing. Morena eventually escapes by being pushed over by a tap of the team.

In 2020, Morena would perform the song again on Maltese television show Hadd Ghalik.
