= Sean Gravina =

Maltese chef and water polo player

- Born: 21 October 1986 (age 39); St. Julian's, Malta
- Partner: Ira Losco
- Children: 2
- Culinary career
- Cooking style: French, Italian, British
- Current restaurant
- Crust
- Previous restaurants
- Chez Phillipe; Maze; The Dorchester

Sean Gravina (born 21 October 1986) is a Maltese chef and a former water polo player with Neptunes WPSC. He is probably best known for appearing in the quarter-final of series 7 of MasterChef on BBC2 in 2014. He is currently Chef Patron at Crust.

== Career ==
An ITS graduate, Sean started his career cooking at The Hilton Malta and Chez Phillipe. This was followed by a stint at London's Le Cordon Bleu, where he received a Cuisine Diploma. While in London, Sean worked for Gordon Ramsay at Maze in Mayfair, as well as London's The Dorchester under the guidance of Chef Wolfgang Puck.

== Personal life ==
In May 2016, it was announced that Sean and his partner, Ira Losco, were expecting a baby. Their son, Harry, was born on 25 August 2016. On 1 December 2019, Sean and Ira got married. On 14 November 2020, Sean became a father for the second time, when his wife Ira gave birth to their daughter, Gigi.
