= Philip Vella =

Maltese composer

Philip Vella is a Maltese musical composer. He has won the main national festivals of Malta several times such as the Malta Song for Europe, International Festival of Maltese Song (Malta Song Festival) as well as L-Għanja tal-Poplu festival. He has successfully competed in International festivals in the Netherlands (song by 'Ebonique' finishing third in the Eurofestival in 2003), finalist in the Belgian Song for Eurovision competition in 2006, Bulgaria (Best song in the 2003 edition of the Discovery song festival), Czech Republic, Slovenia, Kazakhstan (Best song in 2003 Voice of Asia), Romania (3rd placing in the 2005 edition of the Golden Stag festival) as well as six times representing Malta in the Eurovision Song Contest, placing 2nd in 2002 in Estonia with the song "7th Wonder", in 2000 in Sweden with the song "Desire", in 2004 in Turkey with the song ‘On Again... Off Again’ and in 2007 in Finland with the song "Vertigo" that received over 31,000 televotes in Malta. For 2008 he composed the song "Vodka" sung by Morena.

He has composed jingles and signature tunes for television and radio, and computer games music. He is responsible for the soundtrack of many popular teleseriels and documentaries shown on the Maltese TV. He is also the current composer of computer game company Black Pencil responsible for popular games in Germany such as Harry Buster and Smoke Attack 2. Many of his compositions have been used in various special occasions in Malta such as the anthem used in the official celebrations to mark Malta's entry in the European Union 'Worker of the Year' manifestations, the anthem of the Games of the Small States of Europe held in Malta in 2003, the song to celebrate 'Year of languages' in 2002 and also composed the music for the opening ceremony of the Commonwealth heads of Government meeting, held in Malta under the patronage of Queen Elizabeth II. Other compositions include the music used for the opening ceremony of St. George's square in Valletta, and also the song ‘Dinja Gdida, which is the official song of the Community Chest Fund.

Vella has been nominated several times as Best Composer in the Malta Music Awards, and won the Best Author and Best Recording Engineer Awards.

Vella plays the guitar and has been the musical director/arranger for concerts involving Malta's leading artists.

Vella and his son Sean, a pianist/arranger, form part of a production team working on various genres and music production requirements.

Along with Gerard James Borg, Philip Vella has written six Maltese entries for the annual Eurovision Song Contest.

== Eurovision Song Contest entries ==
- Desire by Claudette Pace (Stockholm 2000)
- 7th Wonder by Ira Losco (Tallinn 2002)
- On Again... Off Again by Julie & Ludwig (Istanbul 2004)
- Vertigo by Olivia Lewis (Helsinki 2007)
- Vodka by Morena (Belgrade 2008)
- "Breathlessly" by Claudia Faniello (Kyiv 2017)

== Malta Song For Europe finalists ==
- 1 1994 Good-Bye The Starbrights
- 2 1995 Remember The Beginning Georgina
- 3 1995 Shelter Me Incorvaja Sisters
- 4 1997 Love Can Do Miracles Claudette Pace
- 5 1997 Walk With Me Mark Tonna
- 6 1998 Listen to our Voices Claudette Pace & The Sixth Above – 3rd Place
- 7 1998 Listen Fate
- 8 1999 Breathless Claudette Pace
- 9 1999 The Right Time Lawrence Gray – 2nd Place
- 10 2000 Desire Claudette Pace - WINNER
- 11 2000 Home Grown Tenderness Tarcisio Barbara
- 12 2000 Let's Try Love Once More Alwynn Borg Myatt
- 13 2000 Shine Ira Losco
- 14 2001 Count On Me Lawrence Gray – 3rd Place
- 15 2001 He's My Romeo Nadine Axisa
- 16 2001 Spellbound Ira Losco – 2nd Place
- 17 2002 7th Wonder Ira Losco - WINNER
- 18 2002 Dazzle Me Paula
- 19 2002 One Step Away Ira Losco – 3rd Place
- 20 2003 My Number One Julie & Ludwig
- 21 2003 One Touch Karen Polidano
- 22 2003 Superstitious Charlene & Natasha
- 23 2004 On Again... Off Again Julie & Ludwig - WINNER
- 24 2004 Tango 4 Two Keith Camilleri
- 25 2004 You're On My Mind Lawrence Gray
- 26 2005 Déjà Vu Olivia Lewis – 2nd Place
- 27 2006 Amazing Annabelle Debono
- 28 2007 Look At Me Julie Pomorski
- 29 2007 My Love Isabelle
- 30 2007 Night-Wish Annabelle Debono
- 31 2007 Vertigo Olivia Lewis - WINNER
- 32 2008 Casanova Morena
- 33 2008 Superhero Klinsmann
- 34 2008 Tangled Jessica Muscat
- 35 2008 Throw Your Stones Daniela Vella
- 36 2008 Vodka Morena - WINNER
- 37 2009 Another Side of Me Corazon
- 38 2009 Castaway Marija Galdes
- 39 2009 Crossroads Raquela
- 40 2009 Earth & Sky Talitha Dimech
- 41 2009 Fjamma Tas-Sliem Dario & Grecia Bezzina
- 42 2009 For a Moment Derrick Schembri & Yanika Fava
- 43 2009 Inferno Ludwig Galea
- 44 2009 Kamikaze Lover Baklava
- 45 2009 Lament Ludwig Galea ft. Fidela tal-Bambinu
- 46 2009 Midas Touch Claudia Faniello
- 47 2009 Rock & Rise Klinsmann
- 48 2009 Sexy Girls Evita Magri
- 49 2009 Smoke-Screen Jessica Muscat
- 50 2009 Something About You Laura Bruno
- 51 2009 Typical Me Alison Ellul
- 52 2009 Visions of You Christine Barbara
- 53 2010 Euphoria Baklava
- 54 2010 Fake Jessica Muscat
- 55 2010 Fired Up Foxy Federation
- 56 2010 Here I Am Raquela
- 57 2010 Pizzicato Aldo Busuttil
- 58 2010 Samsara Claudia Faniello
- 59 2010 Three Little Words Ruth Portelli
- 60 2011 Down Down Down Jessica Muscat
- 61 2011 Heart of Glass Cherise Grixti
- 62 2011 Moondance Baklava
- 63 2011 Movie In My Mind Claudia Faniello

== Malta Eurovision Song Contest finalists ==
- 64 2012 7 Days Danica Muscat
- 65 2012 Can't Get Away Nadine Bartolo
- 66 2012 In Your Eyes Lawrence Gray
- 67 2012 Pure Claudia Faniello – 2nd Place
- 68 2012 Dance Romance Jessica Muscat
- 69 2013 Fall like Rome Richard Edwards
- 70 2013 Ultraviolet Jessika
- 71 2014 Oblivion Chris Grech
- 72 2014 Hypnotica Jessika
- 73 2015 Fandango Jessika
- 74 2015 Could Have Been Me Iona Dalli
- 75 2015 Love and let go Ekklesia Sisters
- 76 2016 The Flame Jessika
- 77 2016 Frontline Danica Muscat
- 78 2017 Breathlessly Claudia Faniello - WINNER
