= Miriam Christine =

Maltese pop and rhythm and blues singer

- Born: Miriam Christine Borg; June 30, 1978 (age 48); Santo Antônio do Descoberto, Goiás, Brazil
- Origin: Victoria, Gozo, Malta
- Genres: Pop, R&B
- Occupation: Singer
- Website: www.miriamchristine.com

Miriam Christine Borg (born 30 June 1978) is a Maltese pop and rhythm and blues singer best known for representing Malta in the Eurovision Song Contest 1996.

She was born in Santo Antônio do Descoberto, a small city near Brasília in Brazil, but was adopted and raised on the Mediterranean island of Gozo. She took part in various singing festivals before winning the Song for Europe Festival and representing Malta in the Eurovision Song Contest 1996 with the song "In a Woman's Heart". On the night of the contest, held in Oslo, she was backed by 3 vocalists-one of whom was Georgina Abela, the wife of the composer and a former contestant. In the beginning of the voting Malta was among the top 5 but gradually fell to 10th place with 68 points.

Miriam Christine remains active as a singer in her home country, performing in weddings and on local television shows. In 2008 she formed the Gozo Children's Choir and performed during the Malta Gay Pride celebrations.

== Discography ==
=== Singles ===
Year	Title	Notes
1996	In a Woman's Heart	
2002	Reptile Lover	
2003	Hold On	
2004	What We Really Mean	
2004	Hush	
2004	Synchrnised	
2004	Mystery Mama	
2008	Alone Today	
2009	Mama	
2014	Safe	

=== Albums ===
Year	Title	Notes
1998	Smile and Shine	
2002	L'Emigrant	
2004	Little Zee	

== See also ==
- Malta in the Eurovision Song Contest

Awards and achievements
Preceded by Mike Spiteri with "Keep Me in Mind"	Malta in the Eurovision Song Contest; 1996	Succeeded by Debbie Scerri with "Let Me Fly"
