= Morena (Maltese singer) =

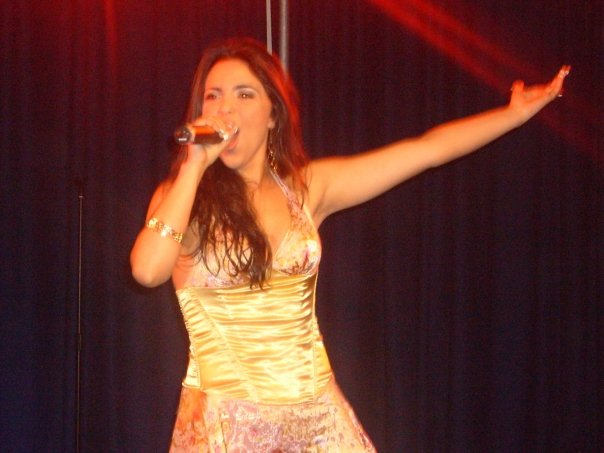
- Morena at Scala nightclub in London

Background information
- Born: Margerita Camilleri Fenech; March 7, 1984 (age 42); Sannat, Gozo, Malta
- Occupation: Singer

Morena (Margaret Camilleri, full name Margerita Camilleri Fenech) (b. 1984) is a Maltese singer. "Morena" means "brunette", which fits her complexion.

== Eurovision Song Contest ==
In 2006, Morena entered the Malta Song for Europe competition with Paul Giordimaina and the song "Time" they ended 9th with 3046 votes.

Two years later Morena entered Malta Song for Europe once again, with 2 songs, "Casanova" and "Vodka". They both passed through from the semi-final to the final. "Casanova" ended 5th with 3,607 televotes and 40 Jury Votes, while "Vodka" won the contest with 49 points from the jury and a total of 16,979 votes from the public (33%).

Morena took part in the second semi-final of the Eurovision Song Contest 2008 in Belgrade on 22 May. However, she did not make it to the final.

Preceded by Olivia Lewis with "Vertigo"	Malta in the Eurovision Song Contest; 2008	Succeeded by Chiara with "What If We"
