= Olivia Lewis =

Maltese singer (born 1978)

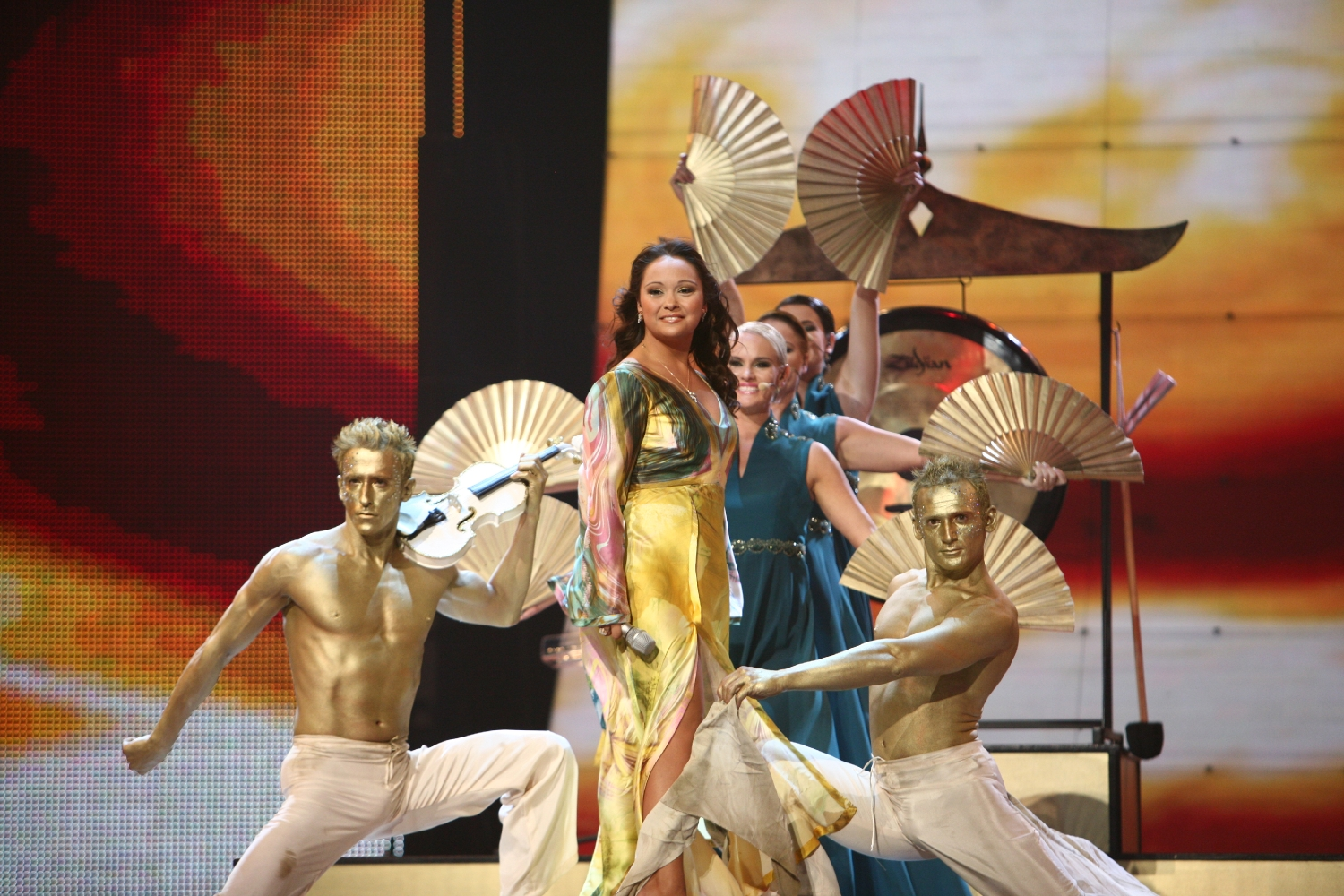

Background information
- Born: 18 October 1978 (age 47)
- Origin: Qormi, Malta
- Years active: 1997–present

Olivia Lewis (born 18 October 1978) is a Maltese singer.

She has competed in the Malta Song For Eurovision festival, which selects the country's entry for the Eurovision Song Contest several times. At her 11th attempt she finally won the 2007 festival, held on 3 February 2007, with the song "Vertigo" and represented Malta at the semi-final of the Eurovision Song Contest held at the Hartwall Areena in Helsinki, Finland, on 10 May 2007. However, she did not manage to qualify for the final. She placed 25th out of 28 countries with just 15 points. Before becoming a professional singer, she was a teacher in Malta.

== Malta Song For Eurovision ==
Year	Placing	Song	Additional information
1997	7th	"Falling (For Your Love)"	singing with Marvic Lewis
1998	15th	"You're The One"	–
1999	7th	"Autumn Of My Love"	–
2000	5th	"Only For You"	–
2000	9th	"I Wanna Love You"	–
2001	7th	"Love Will See Me Through"	–
2001	10th	"Hold Me Now"	–
2002	11th	"Give Me Wings"	–
2003	6th	"Starting Over"	featuring IQ's Verse-One
2004	2nd	"Take A Look"	written by Paul Giordimaina and Fleur Balzan
2005	2nd	"Deja Vu"	written by Philip Vella and Gerard James Borg
2006	2nd	"Spare A Moment"	written by Ray Agius and Godwin Sant
2007	1st	"Vertigo"	written by Philip Vella and Gerard James Borg

Olivia was also the winner of Festival Internazzjonali tal-Kanzunetta Maltija 2013 with the song Hawn mill-Ġdid composed by Paul Abela and penned by Joe Julian Farrugia.

Awards and achievements
Preceded by Fabrizio Faniello with "I Do"	Malta in the Eurovision Song Contest; 2007	Succeeded by Morena with "Vodka"
