= Malta in the Eurovision Song Contest 2002 =

- Eurovision Song Contest 2002
- Participating broadcaster: Public Broadcasting Services (PBS)
- Country: Malta
- Selection process: Malta Song for Europe 2002
- Selection date: 16 February 2002

Competing entry
- Song: "7th Wonder"
- Artist: Ira Losco
- Songwriters: Philip Vella; Gerard James Borg

Placement
- Final result: 2nd, 164 points

Participation chronology

Malta was represented at the Eurovision Song Contest 2002 with the song "7th Wonder", composed by Philip Vella, with lyrics by Gerard James Borg, and performed by Ira Losco. The Maltese participating broadcaster, Public Broadcasting Services (PBS), selected its entry for the contest through the national final Malta Song for Europe 2002. The competition consisted of a final, held on 15 and 16 February 2002, where "7th Wonder" performed by Ira Losco eventually emerged as the winning entry after scoring the most points from a five-member jury and a public televote.

Malta competed in the Eurovision Song Contest which took place on 25 May 2002. Performing during the show in position 20, Malta placed second out of the 24 participating countries, scoring 164 points. This is, to date, Malta's joint best placing at the contest alongside 2005.

== Background ==
Prior to the 2002 Contest, the Maltese Broadcasting Authority (MBA) until 1975, and the Public Broadcasting Services (PBS) since 1991, had participated in the Eurovision Song Contest representing Malta fourteen times since MBA's first entry in 1971. After competing in 1975, Malta was absent from the contest beginning in 1976. They had, to this point, competed in every contest since returning in 1991. Their best placing in the contest thus far was third, achieved on two occasions: in 1992 with the song "Little Child" performed by Mary Spiteri and in 1998 with the song "The One That I Love" performed by Chiara.

As part of its duties as participating broadcaster, PBS organises the selection of its entry in the Eurovision Song Contest and broadcasts the event in the country. The broadcaster had selected its entry consistently through a national final procedure, a method that was continued for its 2002 participation.

== Before Eurovision ==
=== Malta Song for Europe 2002 ===
Malta Song for Europe 2002 was the national final format developed by PBS to select its entry for the Eurovision Song Contest 2002. The competition was held on 15 and 16 February 2002 at the Mediterranean Conference Centre in Valletta, hosted by Peppi Azzopardi and Valerie Vella and broadcast on Television Malta (TVM).

==== Competing entries ====
Artists and composers were able to submit their entries for the competition between 1 September 2001 and 9 November 2001. Songwriters from any nationality were able to submit songs as long as they possessed Maltese origin. Songs were required to be written in English, however, lyrics in other languages were also allowed as long as it does not exceed one line to a quatrain. Artists were able to submit as many songs as they wished, however, they could only compete with a maximum of two in the final. 224 entries were received by the broadcaster. The sixteen songs, selected to compete in the competition from a shortlist of 36 entries that had progressed through the selection process, were announced on 10 December 2001 at a press conference held at the Mediterranean Conference Centre in Valletta. The jury panel that selected the sixteen finalists consisted of Giuseppe Affallo (Spain), Derek Lloyd (United Kingdom), Munro Forbes (United Kingdom), Ismeta Dervoz (Bosnia and Herzegovina) and Albert Galdes (Malta).

==== Final ====
The final took place on 15 and 16 February 2002. Sixteen entries competed and the combination of votes from a five-member jury panel (5/8) and public televoting (3/8) determined the winner. The interval act of the show on 15 February featured performances by Italian singer Gilda Giuliani, Danish guitarist Kaare Norge and the Laura (who would represent Finland in 2002), while the interval act of the show on 16 February featured performances by the Alision White Dance Company, Fabrizio Faniello (who represented Malta in 2001), the band One (who would represent Cyprus in 2002) and Malene Mortensen (who would represent Denmark in 2002). After the votes from the jury panel and televote were combined, "7th Wonder" performed by Ira Losco was the winner. 36,817 votes were registered by the televoting.

Final – 15–16 January 2002
R/O	Artist	Song	Songwriter(s)	Jury	Televote	Total	Place
1	Nadine Axisa	"Think of You"	Marica Axisa, Joe Julian Farrugia	59	15	74	6
2	Lawrence Gray	"What Happened to Our Love"	Ray Agius, Alfred C. Sant	42	48	90	4
3	Andreana Debattista and Karl Spiteri	"Theresa"	Karl Spiteri	48	24	72	8
4	Ira Losco	"One Step Away"	Ray Agius, Philip Vella	47	54	101	3
5	Lawrence Gray	"Moment of Truth"	Paul Abela, Alfred C. Sant	36	36	72	8
6	Gunther Chetcuti	"Wanna Hold On"	Eugenio Schembri, Gunther Chetcuti	47	27	74	6
7	Olivia Lewis	"Give Me Wings"	Paul Giordimaina, Fleur Balzan	35	30	65	11
8	Julie Zahra	"Secret to Share"	Mark Debono, Fiona Cauchi	28	9	37	16
9	Fiona	"Hide and Seek"	Paul Abela, Alfred C. Sant	37	3	40	14
10	Paula	"Dazzle Me"	Philip Vella, Gerard James Borg	56	21	77	5
11	Annalise Ellul	"A New Day Is Dawning"	Dominic Galea, Paul Callus	39	33	72	8
12	Ira Losco	"7th Wonder"	Philip Vella, Gerard James Borg	100	60	160	1
13	Nadine Axisa	"Romantic"	Ray Agius	33	6	39	15
14	Roger Tirazona	"When I'm Near"	Paul Abela, Joe Chircop	23	18	41	13
15	Karen Polidano	"When Comes My Lover"	John David Zammit, Ray Mahoney	61	42	103	2
16	Fiona	"Heaven in My Life"	Paul Giordimaina, Fleur Balzan	39	12	51	12

Detailed Jury Votes
R/O	Song	Juror					Total
R/O	Song	1	2	3	4	5	Total
1	"Think of You"	18	6	9	10	16	59
2	"What Happened to Our Love"	7	8	1	8	18	42
3	"Theresa"	1	16	16	3	12	48
4	"One Step Away"	6	5	8	14	14	47
5	"Moment of Truth"	5	12	7	5	7	36
6	"Wanna Hold On"	16	4	2	16	9	47
7	"Give Me Wings"	4	14	6	1	10	35
8	"Secret to Share"	3	3	14	2	6	28
9	"Hide and Seek"	2	11	4	12	8	37
10	"Dazzle Me"	14	9	12	18	3	56
11	"A New Day Is Dawning"	11	10	5	9	4	39
12	"7th Wonder"	20	20	20	20	20	100
13	"Romantic"	8	7	10	7	1	33
14	"When I'm Near"	12	2	3	4	2	23
15	"When Comes My Lover"	9	18	18	11	5	61
16	"Heaven in My Life"	10	1	11	6	11	39

== At Eurovision ==
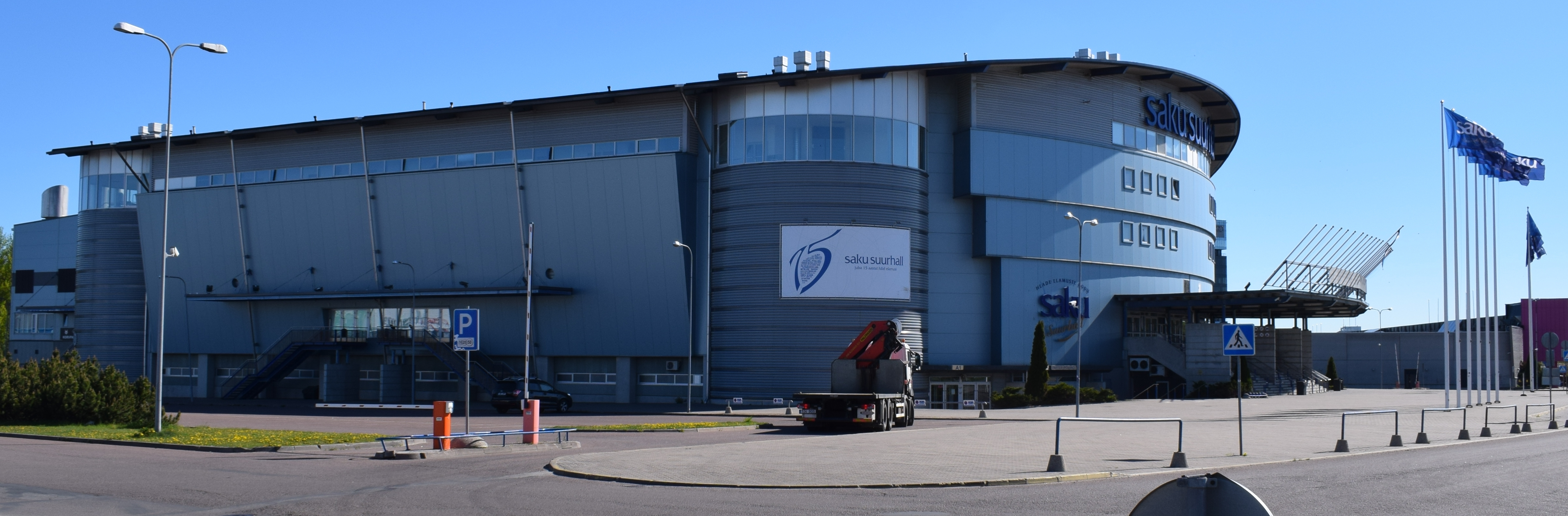
The Eurovision Song Contest 2002 took place at Saku Suurhall in Tallinn, Estonia.

The Eurovision Song Contest 2002 took place at Saku Suurhall in Tallinn, Estonia, on 25 May 2002. The participants list included the previous year's winning country, the "Big Four" countries (France, Germany, Spain, and the United Kingdom), the sixteen highest-scoring participating countries in the previous year's contest and any non-participating countries in the previous year's contest, up to 24 participants in total. On 9 November 2001, an allocation draw was held which determined the running order and Malta was set to perform in position 20, following the entry from Turkey and before the entry from Romania. Malta finished in second place scoring 164 points.

The show was broadcast in Malta on TVM with commentary by John Bundy.

=== Voting ===
Below is a breakdown of points awarded to Malta and awarded by Malta in the contest. The nation, whose votes were based on a 50/50 combination of jury voting and televoting, awarded its 12 points to Cyprus in the contest. PBS appointed Yvette Portelli as its spokesperson to announce the Maltese votes during the show.

Points awarded to Malta
Score	Country
12 points	Croatia; Denmark; United Kingdom
10 points	Cyprus; Germany; Israel; Macedonia; Slovenia; Spain
8 points	Austria
7 points	Belgium; Estonia; Latvia
6 points	France; Greece
5 points	Russia; Turkey
4 points	Bosnia and Herzegovina; Sweden; Switzerland
3 points	Lithuania
2 points	Finland
1 point	

Points awarded by Malta
Score	Country
12 points	Cyprus
10 points	United Kingdom
8 points	Russia
7 points	Latvia
6 points	Romania
5 points	Macedonia
4 points	Germany
3 points	Bosnia and Herzegovina
2 points	Estonia
1 point	Denmark
