= Yada Dance Company =

Yada Dance Company (Young Actors and Dancers Association) is a Maltese entertainment company founded in 1984 by Felix Busuttil and Justin Roy Barker. Past and current choreographers include the founder Felix Busuttil, Justin Roy Barker, Daron Galea, Vivienne Fielding Refalo, Tanya Bayona, Theresa Kerr and Silvio Oddi.

== History ==
In 1989, Felix Busuttil with Justin Roy Barker co-founded the College of Jazz Dance in Malta. In 2000 Felix Busutill joined with Daron Galea to inaugurate the Yada Dance Academy on the Maltese island Gozo. Some of their popular theatrical productions include Dance Spectacular (1994), Firedance (1997), Era (1998), Tango (1998), Minestrone (1999), Phantom (2000), Dirty Dancing (2001), C.H.O.G.M (2005), 25 Filigree (2009) and their most recent successful dance show Michael Jackson Forever (2011). Yada has performed in many countries, including Denmark, Cyprus, Spain, Germany, Portugal, UK, Italy, India, Switzerland, Dubai, Tunisia, France, Libya and Turkey.

== Projects ==
The company performs a broad range of projects including cabaret shows, major theatrical productions, TV shows, commercials, international events, and national festivals.
