= Lawrence Gray (singer) =

Maltese singer

Lawrence Gray (born January 30, 1975) is a Maltese singer.

== Career ==
Early in his career, the rock band Meer was formed and Gray was the singer and frontman. He recorded six songs with this band at Temple Studios in Malta.

Gray participated in Malta Song for Europe seven times, coming twice second, with "The Right Time" in 1999 and with "Why Not" in 2003 (won the televoting). He came third with "Count on Me" in 2001 and he came twice fourth, in 2002 with "What Happened to Our Love" and in 2004 with "You’re on My Mind".

In 2001, Gray won Best Male Singer at the Malta Music Awards. He won the International Festival of Maltese Song in 1998 and in 2002 . He also won the Fidof award both times in this festival. He came second in L-Għanja tal-Poplu in 1999 and won the Malta Independence Festival in 2002. Gray was awarded Best Male Singer and Best International Voice in the international festival Voice of Asia in Kazakhstan in 1999. He placed second in the same festival in 2002, and also won Best Performer, Best Voice and Best Composer. In 2001, at an international festival, Universetalent in Prague, Gray placed second. He was awarded Most Popular Foreign Artist at the 111 International Music Festival in Zrenjanin, Serbia, in 2002.

Gray recorded three songs at Mayfair Studios in London (composer, Geoff Morrow). A video was made of the song "You Are My Lover" at Townhouse Studios in London. Later, Gray returned to London and worked with Paul Murphy, recording another 18 tracks.

Gray took part in many musicals including Jesus Christ Superstar, Andrew Lloyd Webber Celebration, 10th Anniversary Concert of Les Misérables, The King and I, Scrooge, Joseph and the Amazing Technicolour Dreamcoat and many others.

In 2001, Gray participated in a master class for musical theatre in London. He was then chosen to sing the part of Jean Valjean in Les Misérables at the Palace Theatre in London.

Gray sang "Gethsemane" from Jesus Christ Superstar in the first Beyond the Barricade show in Malta in 2003.

Gray was named Best World Singer of 2002, by the website www.mainhill.wallst.ru/eurovision/2003/mal.htm.

In 2002, Gray was a guest singer at Premio Top Sprint – Omaggio alla Sicilianita’ in Catania, Sicily. This was shown on Sicilian television.

In 2003, Gray was invited to go to Cyprus, discovering he had a fan club there. He received an award as Best Promoted Foreign Artist in Cyprus and a gold disc for "Why Not" from Radio Magic 102.2FM.

In 2003, Gray was also a guest singer at the Golden Magnolia Festival in Louisiana, USA.

Gray held a concert, An Evening with Lawrence Gray – Live, at St. James Cavalier, in Valletta, in 2004. Three presentations of the concert were held.

Over the years, Gray was resident singer on various Maltese television programmes. He also sang the feast anthem of various towns and villages in Malta.

In 2014, he participated in the Malta Eurovision Song Contest with the song, "The One That You Love".

In 2015 Lawrence Gray was one of the main singers in Rockestra.
