= Chiara Siracusa =

Maltese singer (born 1976)

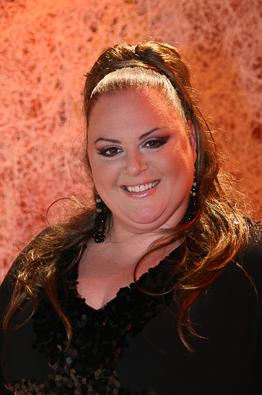
- Chiara in 2009

Background information
- Also known as: Chiara
- Born: 25 September 1976 (age 50)
- Origin: Senglea, Malta
- Genres: Pop, a cappella, soul
- Occupation: Singer
- Years active: 1998–present
- Label: Bridge Productions

Chiara Siracusa (born 25 September 1976), often known mononymously as Chiara, is a Maltese singer who represented her country in the Eurovision Song Contest in 1998, 2005, and 2009.

== Biography ==
=== Eurovision 1998 ===
In 1998, she won Malta's Song for Europe, the country's national final for Eurovision, with the song "The One That I Love", with which she then took part in Eurovision 1998 in Birmingham. She finished in 3rd place after a tense voting sequence, with the final voting country pushing her from joint 1st into 3rd, leaving her just 7 points behind the victorious Dana International of Israel, and 1 point behind Imaani of the United Kingdom. That was Malta's best ever placing at the time, until the 2002 contest. Chiara revealed in a BBC interview two years later that she cried for several hours in the bathroom of her hotel suite after losing by such a small margin, but she came to see her high scoring as an achievement.

=== Eurovision 2005 ===
In 2005, Chiara entered Song for Europe for a second time with her song, "Angel", another ballad which she wrote and composed herself. Along with 21 other entries, she reached the final on 19 February. For the first time, Malta's Eurovision entry was selected solely by a public vote. Chiara won with 11,935 votes, 566 more than her nearest rival Olivia Lewis, and thus won the right to represent Malta at the Eurovision Song Contest 2005 in Kyiv, Ukraine.

Chiara had the distinction of joining an unusually extensive list of artists in the 2005 edition who had competed previously, including Iceland's 1999 runner-up Selma, and Greece's Helena Paparizou, who in the 2001 contest was the lead singer of third-placed Antique. Chiara came second in the contest with 192 points, putting her ahead of Malta's only other Eurovision runner-up, Ira Losco, becoming the most successful Maltese entry of all time. One study has claimed that, were it not for the effects of regional "bloc" voting, Chiara would have won the contest.

After the result in 2005, Chiara had been working a lot around Malta and abroad, most notably in Greece and Cyprus.. She hosted Song for Europe in Malta in 2008.

=== Eurovision 2009 ===
The loss of her father in 2008 was a tough time for Chiara, but as a tribute to him she was even more determined to achieve further success. Chiara returned to the Maltese national selection for a third time, with a song composed by Belgian songwriters Gregory Bilsen and Marc Paelinck. On 7 February 2009, Chiara entered GO Malta EuroSong in an attempt to represent Malta at the Eurovision Song Contest 2009. Qualifying from the sixth semi-final, she would go on to win the jury vote in the final and receive the most public votes in the superfinal, winning Malta's national selection once again. In Moscow, she competed in the first semi-final with her song "What If We" on 12 May. She qualified to the grand final, held on 16 May, and finished in 22nd place.

=== 2010–present ===
Siracusa was the spokesperson for Malta at the Eurovision Song Contest 2010, announcing the points from the Maltese vote. In June 2010, she released the Official Malta Gay Pride Anthem, "Believe (We Are One)".

== Discography ==
- 1998: Shades Of One
- 2000: What You Want
- 2003: Covering Diversions
- 2005: Here I Am
- 2009: What If We

=== Charted Singles ===
Year	Title	Chart positions
Year	Title	German Singles Chart
2005	"Angel"	95

=== Eurovision entries ===
- "The One That I Love"
- "Angel"
- "What If We"

Preceded by Debbie Scerri with "Let Me Fly"	Malta in the Eurovision Song Contest; 1998	Succeeded by Times Three with "Believe 'n Peace"
Preceded by Julie & Ludwig with "On Again... Off Again"	Malta in the Eurovision Song Contest; 2005	Succeeded by Fabrizio Faniello with "I Do"
Preceded by Morena with "Vodka"	Malta in the Eurovision Song Contest; 2009	Succeeded by Thea Garrett with "My Dream"
