= Ira Losco =

Maltese singer and songwriter (born 1981)

Ira Losco M.Q.R.
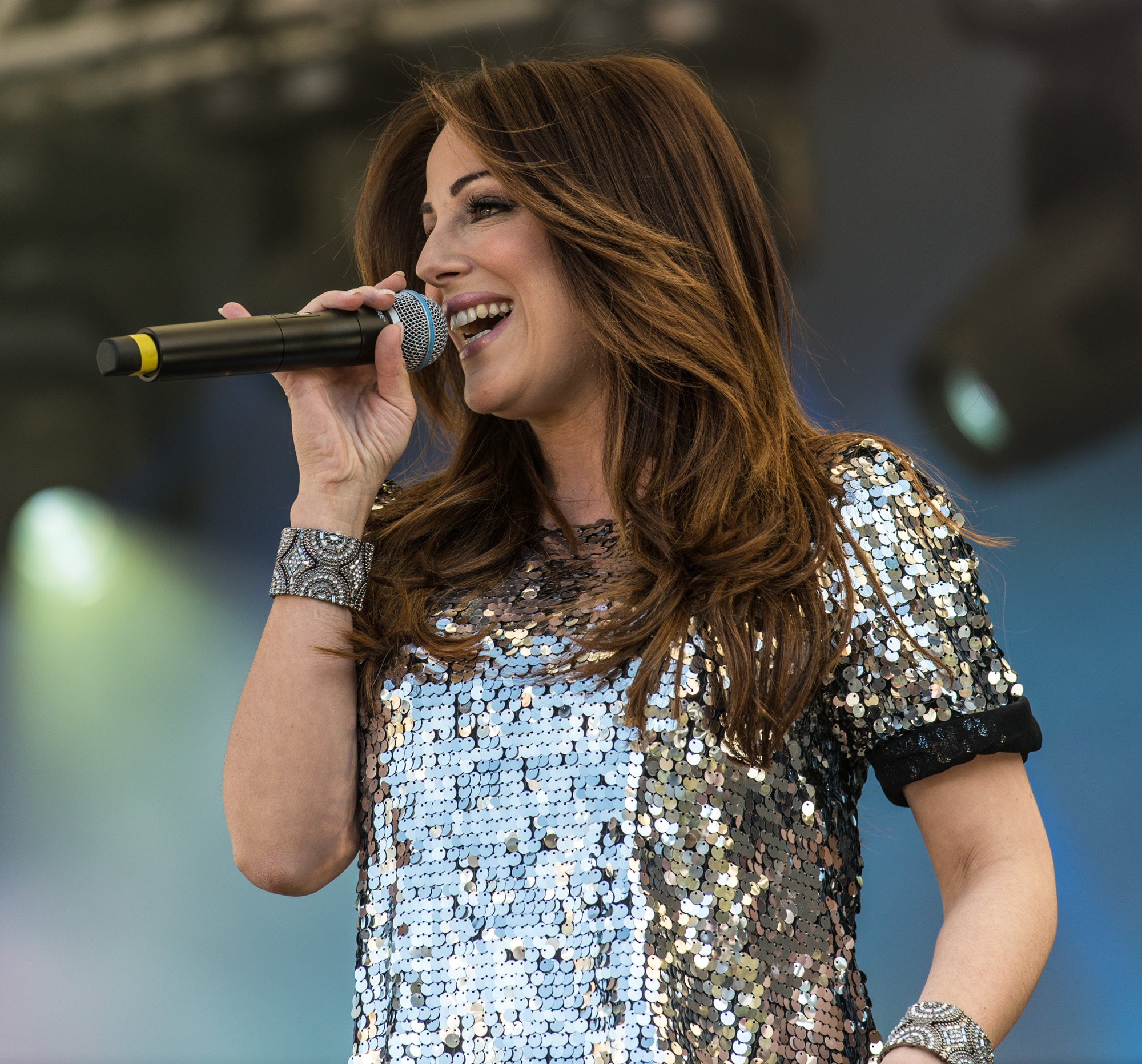
- Losco performing in 2016

Background information
- Born: 31 July 1981 (age 45); Sliema, Malta
- Genres: Pop; pop rock
- Occupations: Singer; songwriter
- Years active: 1998–present

Ira Losco M.Q.R. (born 31 July 1981) is a Maltese singer and songwriter. Her career breakthrough came in 2002, when she represented Malta in the Eurovision Song Contest 2002 with the song "7th Wonder". She placed second in the competition, Malta's best ever result. Fourteen years later, she returned and represented Malta in the Eurovision Song Contest 2016 with the song "Walk on Water", placing twelfth. Losco has released six studio albums so far in her career and is one of the most successful Maltese musicians of all time. In 2018, she served as a judge on the inaugural season of X Factor Malta. She returned to serve as a judge in 2019.

== Career ==
To date Losco has performed in over 15 countries and has won more than 20 music awards. She has appeared in front of audiences ranging from 1,000 to 80,000, and has played alongside renowned international acts such as Elton John, Katie Melua, Maroon 5, Akon, Melanie C, Ronan Keating, Bob Geldof, Tokio Hotel and Gigi D'Alessio.

Losco started her career with a college band called Tiara but they split up a few months after Losco represented her country in the Eurovision Song Contest 2002 which was held in Tallinn. She placed second with the song "7th Wonder".

In 2003, she was chosen to perform the song "Reaching Higher", which was the official song of the Xth Games of the Small States of Europe Malta 2003. Losco was awarded the Midalja għall-Qadi tar-Repubblika in 2008.

Losco has been involved in advertising in her country, including for Guess, McDonald's Salad Plus, and Vodafone's Music Jam Campaign.

Losco won the Maltese national selection for the Eurovision Song Contest 2016 on 23 January, with the song "Walk On Water". On 31 July 2018, it was announced that Losco will be a judge on Malta's version of The X Factor. On the same year, Ira Losco published her double album "No Sinner No Saint" to commemorate her 15th year in the music industry.

== Eurovision Song Contest ==
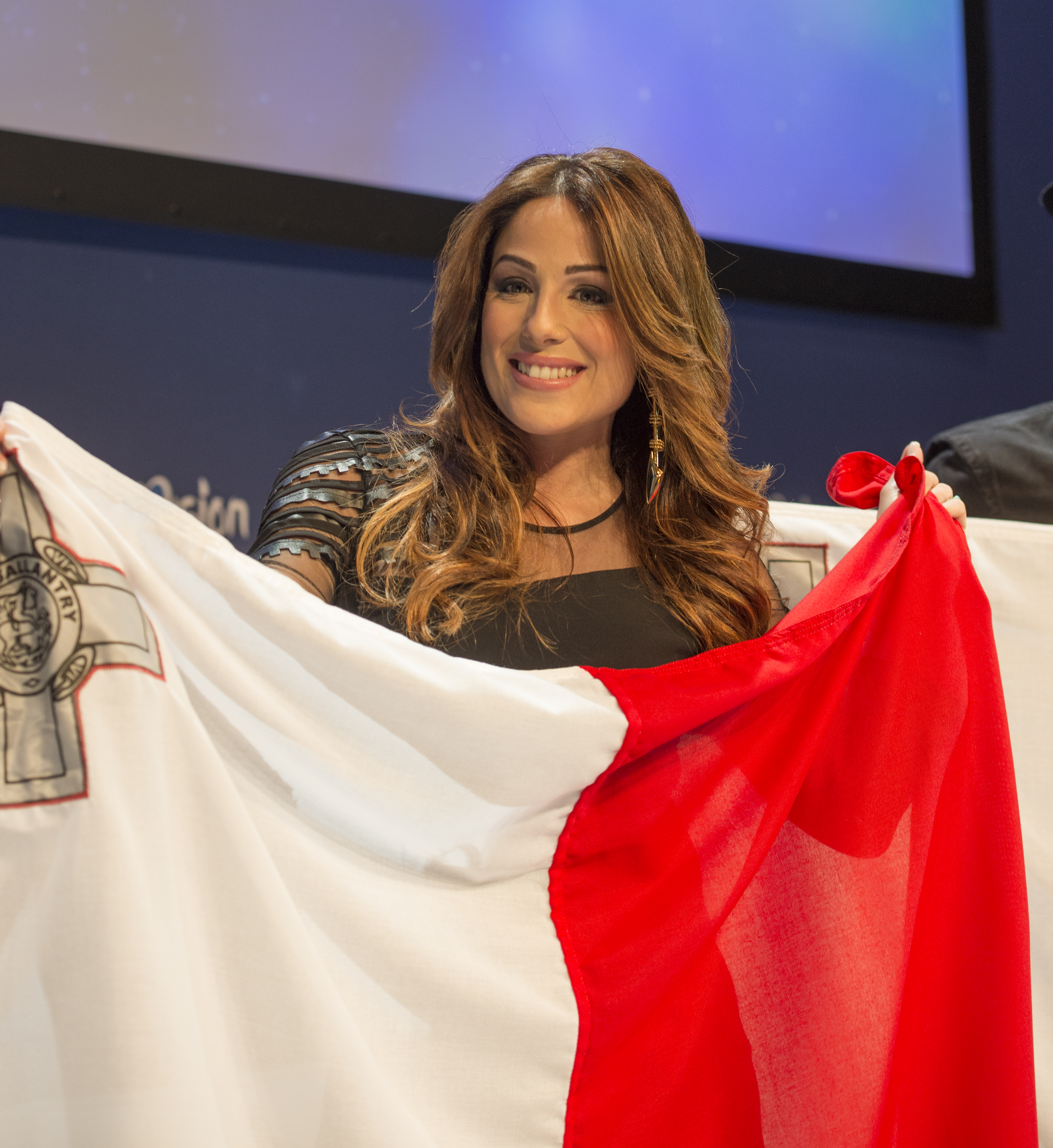
Losco at the ESC 2016

Losco represented Malta at the Eurovision Song Contest 2002 with the song "7th Wonder". She finished runner up, just 12 points behind eventual winner Marie N, which was Malta's highest result ever in the competition until it was equalled in 2005.

In December 2015, it was revealed that Losco had submitted two songs for the Malta Eurovision Song Contest 2016, the country's national selection process. Her entries "Chameleon" and "That's why I love you" were both shortlisted for the semifinal, with "Chameleon" qualifying for the final. On 23 January, Losco won the national selection with over 40% of the votes cast by the Maltese public.

Following Losco's win at the Malta Eurovision Song Contest 2016, she stated that she was open to the idea of performing a song other than "Chameleon" at Eurovision, should it improve Malta's chances of winning. The national final rules, set by PBS, allow for the winning song to be partially modified or completely changed. On 19 February 2016, PBS announced that an international jury consisting of representatives from ten countries, along with local experts from Malta, would be presented with several songs, including a revamped version of "Chameleon", and would determine which song Losco would perform at the contest. On 14 March it was announced that she would perform the song "Walk on Water". The song and video were released on 17 March 2016.

The dress she wore for the contest was by Alex Zabotto-Bentley, who has also designed for Lady Gaga, Prince and Kylie Minogue. In order to increase the chances of winning the contest, the budget was increased drastically, from minimum €200,000 in a previous given year to an approximate maximum of €1,500,000 during Losco's participation in 2016. In the first semi-final, on 10 May 2016, "Walk on Water" qualified for the Eurovision final. In the final on Saturday 14 May 2016, she placed 12th out of 26 countries.

== Personal life ==
In May 2016, it was announced that Losco and her partner, Sean Gravina, were expecting a baby. Their son, Harry, was born on 25 August 2016. On 1 December 2019, Ira and Sean got married. In June 2020, Losco announced that together with her husband and son, they were expecting a baby girl. Their daughter, Gigi, was born on 14 November 2020.

== Activism ==
Losco has publicly expressed her support for a number of social causes in Malta, including LGBT rights and anti-bullying campaigns amongst teenagers. In 2014, she was nominated for the first LGBTI Community Awards organised by the Malta Gay Rights Movement. Losco supports equal rights and acceptance, rather than just tolerance, in the context that her country, Malta, has been known as the best country in Europe and the world in LGBTQI rights. Losco organised an LGBT friendly party in Stockholm during the Eurovision Song Contest 2016.

== Discography ==
Awards and achievements
Preceded by Fabrizio Faniello with "Another Summer Night"	Malta in the Eurovision Song Contest; 2002	Succeeded by Lynn Chircop with "To Dream Again"
Preceded by Amber with"Warrior"	Malta in the Eurovision Song Contest; 2016	Succeeded by Claudia Faniello with "Breathlessly"
