= Malta Music Awards =

Annual Maltese music awards ceremony

- Logo of the Malta Music Awards
- Country: Malta
- Presented by: Mega Music Malta; Public Broadcasting Services; Magic Malta
- First award: 20 October 1995
- Website: www.maltamusicawards.mt

Malta Music Awards (MMA) is an annual music awards ceremony held since October 20, 1995, and organised by Mega Music Malta in collaboration with Public Broadcasting Services and Magic Malta. The aims of the Malta Music Awards include promotion of local artists and awarding their achievements during the previous year, honouring artists for their contributions towards local music throughout their life-long careers, encouraging new talent, promoting of Maltese music, helping artists to better their standards, honouring Maltese artists for achieving international success, supporting local talent generally, showcasing local talent to help its growth and achieving international success, and increasing the public's interest in the local music industry.

Notable local singers, bands, authors, and composers who have won awards at these ceremonies include Chiara, Debbie Scerri, Emma Muscat, Fabrizio Faniello, Freddie Portelli, Ira Losco, Mary Spiteri, Olivia Lewis, Philip Vella, Red Electric, The Travellers, and Winter Moods.

== Categories ==
Award categories of the Malta Music Awards have changed over the years and have included:

- Best Album
- Best Album in Maltese
- Best Alternative
- Best Author
- Best Band
- Best C.D.
- Best C.D. Compilation
- Best C.D. in Maltese
- Best C.D. Sleeve
- Best Composer
- Best Dance
- Best Female Singer
- Best Group
- Best Hip Hop/RN'B
- Best Lyrics
- Best Male Singer
- Best Maltese Lyrics
- Best Metal
- Best Newcomer
- Best Recording Engineer
- Best Solo
- Best Song
- Best Song in Maltese
- Best Song Writer
- Best Video
- Career in Music Recognition
- Breakthrough Artist Award
- Classical Music Award
- International Award
- Life Achievement Award
- Most Promising Artist

== Ceremonies ==
=== Malta Music Awards 1995 ===
The first edition of the Malta Music Award was held on October 20, 1995, at the Mediterranean Conference Centre.

Category	Winners	Other Nominees	Source
Best Male Singer	Alex Schembri	Enzo Guzman; Mike Spiteri; Mark Tonna	
Best Female Singer	Mary Spiteri	Miriam Christine Borg; Georgina; Claudette Pace	
Best Group	The Characters	Limestone Kick; Lord Adder; X-Tend	
Best CD	The Truth - The Characters	A Million A Day – Limestone Kick; Għal Dejjem – Freddie Portelli; Roses, Stars, and Love Songs - Mike Spiteri	
Best Composer	Ray Agius	Paul Abela; Dominic Galea; Philip Vella	
Best Author	Joe Friggieri	Charles Flores; Ray Mahoney; Alfred Sant	
Best CD Sleeve	The Truth - The Characters	A Million a Day – Limestone Kick; Bigfoot – T.F.M.; Il-Bużnanna – Joe James; Woman – Alex Schembri	
Best Recording Engineer	David Vella	Charles Dalli; Robert Longo; Philip Vella	
Best Newcomer	Miriam Christine Borg	Tarcisio Barbara; Mark Tonna; Debbie Scerri	
Best Compilation	Għanja tal-Poplu: L-20 Edizzjoni - YTC	Festival Song For Europe '95; Merħba – Victor Fenech; Eruption – Storm Records	
Best Maltese Lyrics	Le - Lyrics by Walter Micallef	Ismagħni Ftit Ħabib – Lyrics by Sunny Aquilina; Pajjiż tal-Mickey Mouse – Lyrics by Martin Attard; X'Jimpurtani – Lyrics by F. F. Caruana	
Best CD in Maltese	Għal Dejjem - Freddie Portelli	Għanja Ġdida – Fr David; X'Għandna mid-Dinja – The Greenfields; X'Sar Mill-Ħolm – Tony Camilleri	
Best Image	Mary Spiteri	Alex Schembri; Joe Brown; X-Tend	
Life Achievement Awards	Oreste Chircop; Alfred Mizzi; Paul Arnaud		
International Awards	Baby D; Mark Storace; Krojus		
Appreciation towards the most active musician	Joe Brown	George Curmi; Carmine Lauri	

=== Malta Music Awards 1996 ===
Category	Winners	Source
Best Male Singer	Mike Spiteri	
Best Female Singer	Debbie Scerri	
Best Band	Limestone Kick	
Best CD	Passport - Alfred Rapa	
Best CD Compilation	Burdati - Alfred C. Sant	
Best CD in Maltese	Burdati - Alfred C. Sant	
Best Recording Engineer	Robert Longo	
Best Maltese Lyrics	L-Iljieli Sbieħ li Għaddew - Joe Friggieri	
Best Composer	Paul Abela	
Best Author	Alfred C. Sant	
Best CD Sleeve	All About Yourself	
Classical Music Award	Mro. Joe Vella	
Life Achievement Award	Paul Asciak; Oscar Lucas	
International Achievement Award	Miriam Gauci	

=== Malta Music Awards 1997 ===
The 1997 Malta Music Awards were held at the Mediterranean Conference Centre.

Category	Winners	Source
Best Newcomer	Leontine	
Best CD	Power Play – X-Tend	
Best CD Compilation	Home Made Jams	
Best Lyrics	It-Teatru – Enzo Gusman	
Best CD Sleeve	Home Made Jams - Matthew Mangion	
Best Male Singer	Alfred Rapa	
Best Female Singer	Debbie Scerri	
Best Band	Winter Moods	
Best Author	Ray Mahoney	
Best CD in Maltese	Ward Aħmar Għal Ommi – Alfred Rapa	
Best Recording Engineer	Philip Vella	
Best Composer	Ray Agius	
Classical Music Award	Carmine Lauri (Violin)	
International Award	Sharleen Spiteri (Texas)	

=== Malta Music Awards 1998 ===
The 1998 Malta Music Awards were held at the Mediterranean Conference Centre on 23 October.

Category	Winners	Source
Best Male Singer	Fabrizio Faniello	
Best Female Singer	Chiara	
Best Group	Characters	
Best C.D.	Rockomotive – Blade	
Best C.D. Compilation	Song for Europe	
Best C.D. in Maltese	Kuntrasti – New Chapter	
Best Video	Rain	
Best Composer	Ray Agius	
Best Author	Mario Fenech Caruana	
Best Recording Engineer	David Vella-Howard	
Best Maltese Lyrics	Kuntrasti – Josef Delicata	
Best C.D. Sleeve	Rockomotive – Blade (Ian Buhagiar)	
Most Promising Artist	Olivia Lewis	
Classical Music Award	Simon Schembri	

=== Malta Music Awards 1999 ===
The Malta Music Awards 1999 were held at the Mediterranean Conference Centre.

=== Malta Music Awards 2001 ===
The Malta Music Awards 2001 were held on October 20 at the Mediterranean Conference Centre.

Category	Winners	Source
Best Male	Fabrizio Faniello	
Best Female	Ira Losco	
Best Band	Winter Moods	
Most Promising Artist	Glen Vella	
CD Album	Winter Moods	
CD in Maltese	Enzo Gusman	
Best Author	Philip Vella	
Best Composer	Dominic Galea	
Special Recognition	Etnika	

=== Malta Music Awards 2003 ===
The 2003 edition of the Malta Music Awards was held on October 20 at the Mediterranean Conference Centre.

Category	Winners	Source
Best Male	Fabrizio Faniello	
Best Female	Ira Losco	
Best Album	Butterfly House – Winter Moods	
Best Club DJ	Ruby	
Best Hip Hop / RnB	Hooligan	
Best Video	This Year's Love – Beangrowers	
Best Album Producer	David Vella for the album SCAR	
Best Single	Room 7 – Scream Daisy	
Best Upcoming Club DJ	Konrad SK	
Best Dance Producers	Kashmir	
Best heavy Rock Band	Forsaken	
Best Artist Image	Ira Losco	
Best Newcomer	Hooligan	
Best Band	Winter Moods	
Best Sleeve Artwork	Perfect Existence – Sigo	
Best Live Band	Scream Daisy	
Best Fan Award	Maria Azzopardi	
Best Artist's Website	www.mattfenech.com	

=== Malta Music Awards 2007 ===
The Malta Music Awards 2007 were held on October 20 at the Mediterranean Conference Centre.

Category	Winners	Source
Best CD Cover	Chasing Pandora	
Best Hip Hop/R n' B Artist	Sixth Sinfoni	
Best Song Writer	Ivan Grech	
Best Artist Website	Chasing Pandora	
Lifetime Achievement	George Curmi	
Best Dance Production	Toby	
Best Artist Image	Chasing Pandora	
MTA Presentation of Best Local Export	Ira Losco	
Best Female Artist	Ira Losco	
Vodafone Ringtone Award	Winter Moods	
International Achievement Award	Joseph Calleja	
Best Song	Marigold – Winter Moods	
Best Newcomer	Tribalai	
Best Video	Pretty – Scream Daisy	
Best Male Artist	Ivan Filletti	
Best Band	Winter Moods	
Best Album	Accident Prone – Ira Losco	

=== Malta Music Awards 2008 ===
The Malta Music Awards 2008 were held on October 20 at the Mediterranean Conference Centre.

Category	Winners	Source
Best Image	Niki Gravino	
Best Song	Niki Gravino	
Best CD Cover	Niki Gravino	
Best Songwriter	Niki Gravino	
Best Album	Ira Losco	
Best Male Artist	Niki Gravino	
Best Female Artist	Ira Losco	
Best Band	Winter Moods	
Best Local Export	Beangrowers	
Best Video	Beangrowers	
Best Hip Hop & R/B	Cristabelle	
Best New Artist	Airport Impressions	
Best Dance Production	Tenishia	
Legends Award	Winter Moods	
Lifetime Achievement Award	Mary Spiteri	

=== Malta Music Awards 2009 ===
The 2009 edition of the Malta Music Awards was held at the Malta Fairs & Conventions Centre on December 5.

Category	Winners	Source
Best Band	Tribali	
Best Male	Kevin Borg	
Best Female	Carrie Haber	
Best Album	The Elephants of Lanka – Tribali	
Best CD Cover	The Elephants of Lanka – Tribali	
Best Artist Website	www.iralosco.com – Ira Losco	
Lifetime Achievement Award	Freddie Portelli	
International Lifetime Achievement Award	Robin Gibb	
Recognition Award	Mike Reed	
Best New Artist	Red Electrick	
Best Song	Borderline – Airport Impressions	
Best Song Writer	Carrie Haber	
Best Video	Lucija u Samuel – No Bling Show	
Best Artist Image	Tribali	
Best Dance Production	Marigold – Tenishia vs Winter Moods	
Best Hip Hop/R n' B	No Bling Show	
Best Heavy Metal Band	Forsaken	

=== Malta Music Awards 2010 ===
The Malta Music Awards of 2010 were held on November 27 at the Malta Fairs & Conventions Centre. This edition marked 15 years since the first edition of the Awards.

Category	Winners	Other Nominees	Source
Best Dance Production	Stranger to myself - Tenishia ft Aneym	Winter Moods – Tenishia remix; Making you mine – Jo Micali feat U-Bahn & Chess; Under the water – Joseph Armani ft. Eugiene Nois	
Best Video	Who the heck is Rek? - Red Electrick	Walk with me – Airport impressions; My Neverland – Wintermoods; Tears in your eyes - K.O.I	
Best Heavy Metal Band	Nomad son	Loathe; Frenzy Mono; Memento Nostri	
Best New Artist	Mikaela	For strings Inn; K.O.I; Dolls for idols	
Best Male Artist	Aaron Benjamin	Glen Vella; Thomas Hedley; Muxu	
Best Image	Chasing Pandora	Stolen Creep; Indigo; Red Electrick	
Best Female Artist	Kristina Casolani	Mikaela; Eleanor Cassar; Claudia Faniello	
Best Hip Hop / R&B Artist	Dimal ft Madee	Kristina Casolani; Thea; Muxu	
Best CD Cover	O.B.E - Frenzy Mono	These are the roots – Indigo; O.B.E – Frenzy Mono; Vine lady – Red Electrick	
Best Album	Argento - Winter Moods	Breaking Radio silence – Scar; Vine Lady – Red Electrick; The Driver and the dance – Chasing Pandora	
Best Songwriter	Ivan Grech	Chasing Pandora; Airport Impressions; Red Electrick	
Best Website	www.mementonostri.com - Memento Nostri	www.claudiafaniello.com – Claudia Faniello; www.aaronbenjamin.co.uk – Aaron Benjamin; www.eleanorcassar.com – Eleanor Cassar	
Best Band	Winter Moods	Chasing Pandora; Red Electrick; Airport Impressions	
Best Song	My Neverland - Winter Moods	Walk with me – Airport Impressions; Preety Rival – Ellie & the Oscars; Who the heck is Rek? – Red Electrick	

=== Malta Music Awards 2011 ===
The 2011 Malta Music Awards were held on November 26 at the Malta Fairs & Conventions Centre.

Category	Winners	Source
Best Artist Image	No Snow No Alps	
Best Website	www.airportimpressions.com – Airport Impressions	
Best Heavy Metal Band	Beheaded	
International Achievement	Marty Rivers	
Lifetime Achievement Award	Charles Gatt	
Best New Artist	Cruz	
Best Male Artist	Ivan Filletti	
Best CD Cover	Romantik Politik – No Snow No Alps	
Dance Productions Recognition	Jewel Kid	
Best Video	One Life – Glen Vella	
Best Upcoming Artists	Dry Connections	
Best Female Artist	Mikaela	
Best Album	Airport Impressions	
International lifetime Achievement	Billy Ocean	
Best Band	Airport Impressions	
Malta's Export Artist Recognition	Mikaela	
International Breakthrough	Tenishia	
Best Song	Freedom – Airport Impressions	

=== Malta Music Awards 2012 ===
The 2012 edition of the Awards was planned for November 24 at the Malta Fairs & Conventions Centre in Ta’ Qali.

=== Malta Music Awards 2013 ===
This edition of the MMA was held at the Malta Fairs & Conventions Centre on February 3.

Category	Winners	Other nominees	Source
Best Solo Artist	Brooke	Aaron Benjamin; Hooligan; Muxu	
Best Band	Red Electrick	Bletchley Park; Scar; Tribali	
Best Song	Paul - Red Electrick	Our Time – 3 Artists; Tight Red Dress – Bletchley Park; Fairytale – Brooke; What I'd Give – Ira Losco	
Best Album	The Traveller - Tribali	My Body Fighting – Bletchley Park; Unplugged Sessions – Red Electrick; Grandiloquence – Stalko	
Best HipHop/RnB Artist	Hooligan	DK & Bobby; Muxu; Sempliciment Tat-Triq	
Best New Artist	Stalko	Cryptic Street; FellowFish; Planet Seed	
Best Video	What I'd Give - Ira Losco	Fairytale – Brooke; This is the Night – Kurt Calleja; So Over – The Shh	
Best Metal Band	Beheaded	Insurgence; Myopic Destiny; Weeping Silence	
Career Recognition Award	Duo Blank		
International Achievement Award	Gaia Cauchi		
Kompetizzjoni Aġenzija Żgħażagħ	Ylenia Vella		

=== Malta Music Awards 2014 ===
The 2014 ceremony was held at the Malta Fairs & Conventions Centre on 9 February.

Category	Winners	Other nominees	Source
Best Solo Artist	Ira Losco	Chess; Gianluca; Lyndsay	
Best Band	Red Electrick	Airport Impressions; NoSnow/NoAlps; The Crowns	
Best Song	The Runaway – Red Electrick	Daphne – Lyndsay; Hymns of June – Airport Impressions; Me Luv U Long Time – Ira Losco; Start the Revolution – The Rifffs	
Best Album	The Fire – Ira Losco	All Things with Love – The Shh; Someone Else – The Crowns; Summer Lovers – Skimmed	
Best New Artist	PlanZero	Andi; Maxine Pace; Norbert	
Best Video	Me Luv U Long Time – Ira Losco	Hymns of June – Airport Impressions; Marija s-Sabiħa – No Bling Show; Tomorrow – Gianluca; The Runaway – Red Electrick	
International Achievement Award	Gaia Cauchi		
Recognition Award	Gillian Attard		

=== Malta Music Awards 2020 ===
The 2020 edition of the Malta Music Awards marked twenty five years of award shows. The ceremony was held at The Malta Fairs & Conventions Centre on 7 March 2020.

Category	Winners	Other nominees	Source
Best Song (Listeners Choice Award)	Iljuni Fis-Silġ - The Travellers	Hey Now – Ira Losco Ft. Owen Leuellen; Don't Let The Sun Go Down – Toby Ft. Matthew James; Idwk – Kevin Paul; Chameleon – Michela; Still Got Fight – The New Victorians; Dive In – Red Electric; Cannonball – Ira Losco Ft. Michela; Why Should I? – Gaia; High – Matthew James	
Best Band	Red Electric	Airport Impressions; The Crowns; The Travellers	
Best Solo	Ira Losco	Amber; Ivan Grech; Matthew James; Sam Christie	
Best Album	Tragic Optimistic - Red Electric	Blue Tangerine – Blue Tangerine; Next In Line – The Crowns; We Are – Footprints	
Breakthrough Artist of the Year	Michela	Gaia; Luke Chappell; Kevin Paul; Vinyl Paradise	
Best Song in Maltese	Qalu Li Raw - Nadine Axisa	Il-Bir – Djun; Int U Jien – Sterjotipi; Iljuni Fis-Silġ – The Travellers; Nieqaf Ftit – Bernie And Pod	
Best Metal	Beheaded	Clubmurder; Saħħar; It Came From The Desert	
Best Hip Hop/R n' B	Eddie Fresco	Hooli; Zac; Kapitlu Tlettax	
Best Dance	Micimago	Where It's Att; Joseph Armani; Neon Culture	
Best Song Writer	Corazon	Alexia Baldacchino; Miriam Christine; Matthew James	
Best Album in Maltese	Il-Ħoss Tal-Għabex - Nadine Axisa	Qilla Tal-Qrun – Saħħar; Għall-Bejgħ – Corazon; Il-Ħlas – Djun	
Lifetime Achievement Award	The Greenfields	No other nominees	
International Achievement Award	Emma Muscat	No other nominees	
Career in Music Recognition Award	Toni Sant; Ray Mifsud Bonnici	No other nominees	
Aġenzija Żgħażagħ Award	Maria Debono - Black Out	Mark Ciantar – Whatever Comes Next; Maya Morrow – Stop Wasting Your Time; Lara Micallef – Sleep	

== See also ==
- Music of Malta
