= Malta in the Eurovision Song Contest 2011 =

- Eurovision Song Contest 2011
- Participating broadcaster: Public Broadcasting Services (PBS)
- Country: Malta
- Selection process: Malta Eurosong 2011
- Selection date: 12 February 2011

Competing entry
- Song: "One Life"
- Artist: Glen Vella
- Songwriters: Paul Giordimaina; Fleur Balzan

Placement
- Semi-final result: Failed to qualify (11th)

Participation chronology

Malta was represented at the Eurovision Song Contest 2011 with the song "One Life" written by Paul Giordimaina and Fleur Balzan. The song was performed by Glen Vella. The Maltese entry for the 2011 contest in Düsseldorf, Germany was selected through the national final Malta Eurosong 2011, organised by the Maltese broadcaster Public Broadcasting Services (PBS). The competition consisted of a semi-final round and a final, held on 11 and 12 February 2011, respectively, where "One Life" performed by Glen Vella eventually emerged as the winning entry after scoring the most points from a six-member jury and a public televote.

Malta was drawn to compete in the first semi-final of the Eurovision Song Contest which took place on 10 May 2011. Performing during the show in position 11, "One Life" was not announced among the top 10 entries of the first semi-final and therefore did not qualify to compete in the final on 14 May. It was later revealed that Malta placed eleventh out of the 19 participating countries in the semi-final with 54 points.

== Background ==
Prior to the 2011 contest, Malta had participated in the Eurovision Song Contest twenty-three times since its first entry in 1971. Malta briefly competed in the Eurovision Song Contest in the 1970s before withdrawing for sixteen years. The country had, to this point, competed in every contest since returning in 1991. Malta's best placing in the contest thus far was second, which it achieved on two occasions: in 2002 with the song "7th Wonder" performed by Ira Losco and in the 2005 contest with the song "Angel" performed by Chiara. In the 2010 edition, Malta failed to qualify to the final with the song "My Dream" performed by Thea Garrett.

For the 2011 contest, the Maltese national broadcaster, Public Broadcasting Services (PBS), broadcast the event within Malta and organised the selection process for the nation's entry. PBS confirmed their intentions to participate at it on 21 September 2010. Malta selected their entry consistently through a national final procedure, a method that was continued for their 2011 participation.

== Before Eurovision ==
=== Malta Eurosong 2011 ===
Malta Eurosong 2011 was the national final format developed by PBS to select the Maltese entry for the Eurovision Song Contest 2011. The competition consisted of a semi-final and final held on 11 and 12 January 2011, respectively, at the Mediterranean Conference Centre in the nation's capital city of Valletta. Both shows were hosted by Keith Demicoli and Valerie Vella and broadcast on Television Malta (TVM) and Radio Malta with commentary by Tony Micallef as well as on the official Eurovision Song Contest website eurovision.tv.

==== Format ====
The competition consisted of twenty-four songs competing in the semi-final on 11 February 2011 where the top sixteen entries qualified to compete in the final on 12 February 2011. Six judges evaluated the songs during the shows and each judge had an equal stake in the final result. The results of the public televote had a weighting equal to the votes of three judges. Ties in the final results were broken based on the entry which received the higher score from the judges. The six members of the jury that evaluated the entries during both the semi-final and final consisted of:

- Ruth Amaira (Malta) – Journalist
- Carmen La Sorella (San Marino) – General manager of the San Marino RTV (SMRTV)
- Husniyya Maharramova (Azerbaijan) – Head of Delegation for Azerbaijan at the Eurovision Song Contest
- Maia Baratashvili (Georgia) – Head of Delegation for Georgia at the Eurovision Song Contest
- Leonardo De Amicis (Italy) – Conductor and composer
- Riccardo Cocciante (Italy) – Singer-songwriter

==== Competing entries ====
Artists and composers were able to submit their entries between 25 and 26 November 2010. Songwriters from any nationality were able to submit songs as long as the artist were Maltese or possessed Maltese citizenship. Maltese songwriters were able to submit a maximum of four songs and foreign songwriters were able to submit a maximum of two songs. Artists were able to submit a maximum of two songs, however, they could only compete with a maximum of one in the semi-final. The winner of the 2010 edition of the TVM talent show L-Isfida, Cherise Grixti, was awarded a wildcard to directly compete in the semi-final. Former national final winners Morena, Chiara and Thea Garrett were unable to compete due to a rule that prevented the previous three winners from competing in the following competition. 141 entries were received by the broadcaster and 74 entries had been shortlisted to progress through the selection process. The twenty-four songs selected to compete in the semi-final were announced on 8 January 2011. Among the selected competing artists was former Maltese Eurovision entrant Fabrizio Faniello who represented Malta in 2001 and 2006 contests, while Sophie Debattista represented Malta in the Junior Eurovision Song Contest 2006.

==== Semi-final ====
The semi-final took place on 11 February 2011. Twenty-four songs competed for sixteen qualifying spots in the final. The running order for the semi-final was announced on 26 January 2011. The show was opened with a guest performance by the 2010 Maltese Eurovision entrant Thea Garrett performing "My Dream", while the interval act featured Thea Garrett performing "In Our Love" together with 2010 Polish Eurovision entrant Marcin Mroziński.

Semi-final – 11 February 2011
R/O	Artist	Song	Songwriter(s)	Result
1	Amber	"Catch 22"	Ray Agius, Godwin Sant	Advanced
2	Kurt Calleja	"Over and Over"	Johan Jämtberg, Kurt Calleja	Advanced
3	Cherise Grixti	"Heart of Glass"	Philip Vella, Gerard James Borg	—N/a
4	Wayne Micallef	"Everybody Sing"	Wayne Micallef	Advanced
5	Claudia Faniello	"Movie In My Mind"	Philip Vella, Gerard James Borg	Advanced
6	Klinsmann and Ben	"This Love"	Klinsmann Coleiro, Jonathan Spiteri	Advanced
7	Eleanor Cassar	"Hypnotized"	Paul Giordimania, Fleur Balzan	Advanced
8	Domenique Azzopardi	"I'll Follow the Sunshine"	Ralph Siegel, Bernd Meinunger	—N/a
9	Rosman Pace	"You'll Never Know"	Steven D. Cook, Jordan Milnes	—N/a
10	Raquela	"If I Could Do It All Again"	Marc Paelinck, Mathias Strasser	Advanced
11	Sophie Debattista	"Love to Love You"	Elton Zarb, Sophie Debattista	—N/a
12	Petra Zammit	"Unintentional"	Elton Zarb, Rita Pace	—N/a
13	Baklava	"Moondance"	Philip Vella, Gerard James Borg	Advanced
14	Jamie Tonna	"Lost Without You"	Marco Debono, Aidan O'Connor	—N/a
15	Amber	"Touch Wood"	Ray Agius, Alfred C. Sant	—N/a
16	Anna Azzopardi	"Unfaithful"	Renato Briffa, Keith Zammit	—N/a
17	Marilena feat. Michael	"He's a Demon"	Michael Henry, Anthony Grech	Advanced
18	Glen Vella	"One Life"	Paul Giordimaina, Fleur Balzan	Advanced
19	J. Anvil	"Topsy Turvy"	Jonas Gladnikoff, Niall Mooney, Andrew Zahra, Deo Grech, Natasha Turner	Advanced
20	Jessica Muscat	"Down Down Down"	Philip Vella, Jessica Muscat	Advanced
21	Kelly Schembri	"Love Me Like Your Money"	Sven Lundholm, Gerard James Borg	Advanced
22	Fabrizio Faniello	"No Surrender"	Johan Stentorp, Johan Bejerholm	Advanced
23	Ally	"Numb"	Alison Ellul	Advanced
24	Richard Edwards	"Finally"	Jan Van Dijck, Richard Micallef	Advanced

==== Final ====
The final took place on 12 February 2011. The sixteen entries that qualified from the semi-final were performed again and the votes of a six-member jury panel (2/3) and the results of public televoting (1/3) determined the winner. In addition to the performances of the competing entries, the show also featured guest performances by 2011 British Eurovision entrants Blue performing "If You Come Back", Riccardo Cocciante and the local band Winter Moods. After the votes from the jury panel and televote were combined, "One Life" performed by Glen Vella was the winner.

Final – 12 February 2011
R/O	Artist	Song	Jury	Televote	Total	Place
1	Eleanor Cassar	"Hypnotized"	12	3	15	10
2	Amber	"Catch 22"	1	6	7	13
3	Jessica Muscat	"Down Down Down"	0	0	0	15
4	Ally	"Numb"	15	0	15	10
5	Baklava	"Moondance"	15	30	45	6
6	Fabrizio Faniello	"No Surrender"	36	21	57	4
7	Kurt Calleja	"Over and Over"	54	15	69	3
8	Glen Vella	"One Life"	54	36	90	1
9	Marilena feat. Michael	"He's a Demon"	1	0	1	14
10	J. Anvil	"Topsy Turvy"	3	12	15	10
11	Claudia Faniello	"Movie In My Mind"	19	0	19	9
12	Richard Edwards	"Finally"	64	24	88	2
13	Raquela	"If I Could Do It All Again"	28	18	46	5
14	Kelly Schembri	"Love Me Like Your Money"	0	0	0	15
15	Wayne Micallef	"Everybody Sing"	23	0	23	8
16	Klinsmann and Ben	"This Love"	23	9	32	7

Detailed Jury Votes
R/O	Song	R. Amaira	C. La Sorella	H. Maharramova	M. Baratashvili	L. De Amicis	R. Cocciante	Total
1	"Hypnotized"		3	2	6		1	12
2	"Catch 22"	1						1
3	"Down Down Down"							0
4	"Numb"	2	2	4	3	2	2	15
5	"Moondance"	8	6		1			15
6	"No Surrender"	5	7	8		8	8	36
7	"Over and Over"	10	12	10	8	7	7	54
8	"One Life"	6	5	7	12	12	12	54
9	"He's a Demon"		1					1
10	"Topsy Turvy"				2	1		3
11	"Movie In My Mind"			6	4	5	4	19
12	"Finally"	12	10	12	10	10	10	64
13	"If I Could Do It All Again"	7	4	1	7	4	5	28
14	"Love Me Like Your Money"							0
15	"Everybody Sing"	4		5	5	6	3	23
16	"This Love"	3	8	3		3	6	23

=== Preparation ===
Following Vella's win at the Malta Eurosong 2011, PBS announced that "One Life" would undergo remastering for the Eurovision Song Contest. The composer of the song Paul Giordimaina worked with Andrew Zammit and Miles Showell to produce the revamped version at the Metropolis Studios in London. The release of the song's new version and official music video was announced on 14 March 2011 and made available online on the broadcaster's website tvm.com.mt. The music video for the song was filmed earlier in March and featured 45 people selected through auditions from over 900 applications received.

=== Promotion ===
Glen Vella made several appearances across Europe to specifically promote "One Life" as the Maltese Eurovision entry. On 2 March, Vella performed during the Greek Eurovision national final. On 5 March, he performed during the Portuguese Eurovision national final. Glen Vella also completed promotional activities in Italy and Armenia where he performed during Top of the Pops Italy on 26 March and the National Music Awards on 27 March, respectively. On 14 April, Vella performed during the Eurovision in Concert event which was held at the Club Air venue in Amsterdam, Netherlands and hosted by Cornald Maas, Esther Hart and Sascha Korf. On 17 April, Vella performed during the London Eurovision Party, which was held at the Shadow Lounge venue in London, United Kingdom and hosted by Nicki French and Paddy O'Connell.

== At Eurovision ==
The Eurovision Song Contest 2011 took place at the Esprit Arena in Düsseldorf, Germany and consisted of two semi-finals on 10 and 12 May, and the final of 14 May 2011. According to Eurovision rules, all nations with the exceptions of the host country and the "Big Five" (France, Germany, Italy, Spain and the United Kingdom) are required to qualify from one of two semi-finals in order to compete for the final; the top ten countries from each semi-final progress to the final. The European Broadcasting Union (EBU) split up the competing countries into six different pots based on voting patterns from previous contests, with countries with favourable voting histories put into the same pot. On 17 January 2011, an allocation draw was held which placed each country into one of the two semi-finals, as well as which half of the show they would perform in. Malta was placed into the first semi-final, to be held on 10 May 2011, and was scheduled to perform in the second half of the show. The running order for the semi-finals was decided through another draw on 15 March 2011 and Malta was set to perform in position 11, following the entry from Finland and before the entry from San Marino.

The two semi-finals and the final were broadcast in Malta on TVM with commentary by Eileen Montesin. The Maltese spokesperson, who announced the Maltese votes during the final, was Kelly Schembri.

=== Semi-final ===
Glen Vella took part in technical rehearsals on 2 and 5 May, followed by dress rehearsals on 9 and 10 May. This included the jury show on 9 May where the professional juries of each country watched and voted on the competing entries.

The Maltese performance featured Glen Vella wearing jeans, white t-shirt, black waistcoat and jacket with a pair of pink framed sunglasses in his breast pocket, and performing together with three backing vocalists standing on slightly raised platforms as well as two dancers. The background LED screens projected brightly coloured geometric patterns and shapes with the background alternating between black and white colours. The backing vocalists that joined Glen Vella on stage were Angela Spiteri, Isabelle Zammit and Pamela Bezzina, while the dancers were Sandro Zammit and Simon Law.

At the end of the show, Malta was not announced among the top 10 entries in the first semi-final and therefore failed to qualify to compete in the final. It was later revealed that Malta placed eleventh in the semi-final, receiving a total of 54 points.

=== Voting ===
Voting during the three shows involved each country awarding points from 1-8, 10 and 12 as determined by a combination of 50% national jury and 50% televoting. Each nation's jury consisted of five music industry professionals who are citizens of the country they represent. This jury judged each entry based on: vocal capacity; the stage performance; the song's composition and originality; and the overall impression by the act. In addition, no member of a national jury was permitted to be related in any way to any of the competing acts in such a way that they cannot vote impartially and independently.

Following the release of the full split voting by the EBU after the conclusion of the competition, it was revealed that Malta had placed eighteenth with the public televote and sixth with the jury vote in the first semi-final. In the public vote, Malta scored 24 points, while with the jury vote, Malta scored 84 points.

Below is a breakdown of points awarded to Malta and awarded by Malta in the second semi-final and grand final of the contest. The nation awarded its 12 points to Croatia in the semi-final and to Azerbaijan in the final of the contest.

==== Points awarded to Malta ====
Points awarded to Malta (Semi-final 1)
Score	Country
12 points	San Marino
10 points	
8 points	
7 points	Armenia; Azerbaijan
6 points	Albania; Georgia
5 points	Serbia
4 points	Croatia
3 points	
2 points	Hungary; Norway; Turkey
1 point	Lithuania

==== Points awarded by Malta ====
Points awarded by Malta (Semi-final 1)
Score	Country
12 points	Croatia
10 points	Azerbaijan
8 points	Georgia
7 points	Armenia
6 points	San Marino
5 points	Greece
4 points	Norway
3 points	Serbia
2 points	Turkey
1 point	Hungary

Points awarded by Malta (Final)
Score	Country
12 points	Azerbaijan
10 points	Italy
8 points	Ireland
7 points	United Kingdom
6 points	Sweden
5 points	Denmark
4 points	Ukraine
3 points	Slovenia
2 points	Austria
1 point	France
