= Festival Kanzunetta Indipendenza =

Konkors Kanzunetta Indipendenza ("Independence Song Contest") is Maltese song competition held on a day near September 21 (Malta's independence day). All songs are performed in the Maltese language and is one of the most anticipated events on the Maltese musical calendar. The event first took place back in 1983 in a span of four years until 1987 before returning just 10 years later in 1997 going on to take place each and every year since then. Several local stars like to submit their entries into such a prestigious musical event due to the fact that the songs are written in Maltese. In recent years there were a number of winners who went on to be successful both locally and abroad. Below you could find the list of the past winners.

== List of winners ==
- 1983 - Jo Naudi with the song Nibqgħu Ngħożżuh Malti
- 1984 - Tanya Camilleri with the song Lejn l-Għaqda u s-Sliem
- 1985 - Adelina Attard with the song Għajta Kotrana
- 1986 - Brown Rice with the song Il-Ħaddiem tas-Sena
- 1987 - Godwin Lucas with the song Viżjoni
- 1997 - Tarcisio Barbara with the song In-Nar Ħa
- 1998 - Miriam Christine with the song Nistaqsi
- 1999 - Claudette Pace with the song Ejjew Nippruvaw
- 2000 - Mark Tonna with the song Waħdek Ma Tkun Qatt
- 2001 - Ira Losco with the song Fejn Staħbejtli
- 2002 - Lawrence Gray with the song L-Għażla f'Idejna
- 2003 - Roger Tirazona & Nadine Axisa with the song Inħarsu 'l Quddiem
- 2004 - Natasha & Charlene with song the L-Arka tal-Libertà
- 2005 - Eleanor Cassar with song the Ix-Xemx mill-Ġdid
- 2006 - Claudia Faniello with the song Ma Nafx
- 2007 - Ivan & Kaya with the song Dan Hu L-Mument
- 2008 - Is-Sitta with the song Nistgħu Nirnexxu
- 2009 - Anabelle with the song 1964
- 2010 - Amber Bondin with the song Trid Tapprezza
- 2011 - Mike Spiteri with the song B'Rieda tal-Azzar
- 2012 - Deborah C with the song Jekk Nuzaw Moħħna
- 2013 - Fabrizio Faniello with the song Aħfirli Jekk Trid
- 2014 - Michela Galea with the song Mixja Li Bdiet
- 2015 - Analise Mifsud with the song Kuraġġ
- 2016 - Dario Bezzina with the song Se Naslu Żgur
- 2017 - Nicole Falzon with the song Bħal Fjura
- 2018 - Sarah Bonnici with the song Il-Pinna
- 2019 - Rachel Lowell with the song Li Stajt Nagħżel Jien
- 2020 - Ruth Portelli with the song Kuruni
- 2021 - Cherylis with the song Nifs
- 2023 - Eliana Gomez Blanco with the song Kanizzata
- 2024 - Karei with the song Nistħajlek Hawn
- 2025 - Martina Fenech with the song Ħajjitna

== Runners-Up (2nd place) ==
- 1999 - Roberta Cassar with the song Qalbi Taf Tħoss
- 2000 - Fabrizio Faniello with the song Inhobbok…Tgħid lil Ħadd
- 2001 - Eleanor Cassar & Glen Vella with the song M'Hawnx Bħalek
- 2002 - Lawrence Gray with the song Ħalluni Nkanta
- 2003 - Mike Spiteri with the song Grazzi Mill-Qalb
- 2004 - Mark Spiteri Lucas & Donna Marie with the song Il-Ballata tal-Mara Li Ħabbet
- 2005 - Janvil with the song Int u Jien
- 2006 - Kaya with the song Se Nkun Viċin
- 2007 - Klinsman with the song KC1FM
- 2008 - Dorothy Bezzina with the song Qalb iċ-Ċpar
- 2009 - Kaya with the song Lilek Biss
- 2010 - Gloriana Arpa Belli with the song Fil-Mużika
- 2011 - Albertine u l-Qamha with the song Skont id-Daqqa ż-Żifna
- 2012 - Marilena with the song Bl-Ikbar Serjetà
- 2013 - Neville Refalo with the song Hemm Miegħek Jien
- 2014 - Marilena with the song Ġabuna Indipendenti
- 2015 - Dorcas Debono with the song Ma Ninsa Qatt
- 2016 - Kaya with the song B'Ħarsitna 'l Fuq
- 2017 - Chanelle Galea with the song Ċans tad-Deheb
- 2018 - Victoria Sciberras with the song Siluwett
- 2019 - Danica Muscat with the song Sfumaw
- 2020 - Mardy Farrugia with the song Fjuri
- 2021 - Mark Portelli with the song Forsi Ismi Ssejjaħ
- 2023 - Ishmael Grech with the song Tfajjel Ruxxan
- 2024 - Kristy Spiteri with the song Il-Ħtija Tagħna Lkoll
- 2025 - Daniel Sammut with the song Pajsaġġ Malti

== 3rd place ==
- 1999 - Mark Tonna with the song Il-Bikja tal-Lejl
- 2000 - Maronia Attard with the song Mistoqsija
- 2001 - Ira Losco with the song Hawn Jien Jekk Tridni
- 2002 - Miriam Christine with the song Nessini
- 2003 - Roberta Cassar with the song Semma Leħnek
- 2004 - Romina Mamo with the song Saħħartni
- 2005 - Nadine Axisa with the song Ma Rridx
- 2006 - Cliff & Annabelle with the song Ġenna Tal-Art
- 2007 - Eleanor Cassar with the song Fil-Fond tal-Qalb
- 2008 - Claire Caruana with the song X'Inhu l-Mewġ?
- 2009 - Fabrizio Faniello with the song Futur
- 2010 - Romina Mamo with the song L-Eroj
- 2011 - Janice Mangion with the song Eternità
- 2012 - Domenique with the song Tama u Kuraġġ
- 2013 - Nicole Brincat with the song Ħallini Ngħidlek
- 2014 - Cherylis with the song Ħolma Ta' Nazzjon
- 2015 - Dario Bezzina with the song Dment li l-Malti Ħaj
- 2016 - Karen DeBattista with the song Ħarstek
- 2017 - Francesca Borg with the song Ftit Ħin
- 2018 - Sebastian Calleja with the song Dak li Taf
- 2019 - Amber Grace with the song Ngħix
- 2020 - Graziella Vella with the song Darba f'Mitt Qamar
- 2021 - Kylie Meilak with the song Mill-Petali Mneżżgħa
- 2023 - Francesca Sciberras with the song Bennini
- 2024 - Enya Magri with the song Bizzilla
- 2025 - Jan Camilleri with the song Ħarsa

== Talent Ġdid Winners ==
- 2008 - Gabriella Massa with the song Għada mas-Sebħ
- 2009 - Dian Bland with the song Ġenerazzjoni
- 2010 - Cherylis Camilleri with the song Nemmen Fik
- 2011 - Angelica Portelli with the song Ejjew Nieqfu
- 2012 - Sarah Bonnici with the song Bil-Bnadar f'Idejna
- 2013 - Kimberly & Lyann with the song Kliem Maġija
- 2014 - Kurt Cassar with the song Inservi
- 2015 - Mikaela Bajada with the song Għandi Ħolma
- 2016 - Shaun Zaffarese with the song Vittorja
- 2017 - Nicole Falzon with the song Bħal Fjura
- 2018 - Maria Spiteri with the song Manann

== Public Opinion Winners ==
- 1999 - Roberta Cassar with the song Qalbi Taf Tħoss
- 2000 - Maronia Attard with the song Mistoqsija
- 2002 - Shirley Galea with the song Qatt Daqs Illum
- 2003 - Maronia Attard with the song Jekk Taf
- 2004 - Anna Azzopardi & Ivan Borg with the song Il-Ħarsa T'Għajnejk
- 2005 - Maria Mallia with the song Sejħiet
- 2006 - Tristan B with the song L-Għanja Taż-Żmien Ġdid
- 2007 - Klinsmann Coleiro with the song KC1FM
- 2008 - Deborah C with the song Pandora
- 2009 - Christian Azzopardi with the song Madre Perla
- 2010 - Roseann Cordina with the song Jum Wieħed
- 2011 - Deborah C with the song Fjamma
- 2012 - Deborah C with the song Jekk Nużaw Moħħna
- 2013 - Domenique with the song B'Ħarsitna 'l Fuq
- 2014 - Phylissienne Brincat with the song Tħobbni Kif Jien
- 2015 - Nicole Borg with the song Fis-Seba' Sema
- 2016 - Aidan Cassar with the song Speċjali
- 2017 - Dorcas Debono with the song Xwejħa
- 2018 - Martina Fenech with the song Qalbi
- 2019 - Kevin Cortis with the song Kif Ma Tismax
- 2020 - Krista Spiteri Lucas with the song Jgħidulek
- 2021 - Martina Fenech with the song Xtaqt Sejjaħtlek Pa
- 2023 - Eliana Gomez Blanco with the song Kannizata
- 2024 - Enya Magri with the song Bizzila
- 2025 - Cherylis with the song Għala Jiena?

== KKI Junior Winners ==
- 2014 - 1st place - Kayley Cuschieri with the song Għannaqni
- 2014 - 2nd place - Jurgen Xerri with the song Ħajjitna f'Idejna
- 2014 - 3rd place - Destiny Chukunyere with the song Festa t'Ilwien
- 2014 - Televoting - Naomi Busuttil with the song Damma
- 2015 - 1st place - Paolo Micallef with the song Maġija B'Teknoloġija
- 2015 - 2nd place - Nicole Falzon with the song Ngħix Ħolma
- 2015 - 3rd place - Rutger Scicluna Galea with the song Inħobbkom It-Tnejn
- 2015 - Televoting - Wynona Bartolo with the song Quddiem Għajnej

An eight-page supplement of the Maltese newspaper In-Nazzjon of 18 September 2006 published on the occasion of the 2006 edition of the Konkors Kanzunetta Indipendenza compiled by Raymond Miceli with information about this year's edition and with a special article about all the singers who participated in previous editions.
