= Sebastian Calleja =

Maltese singer (born 1998)

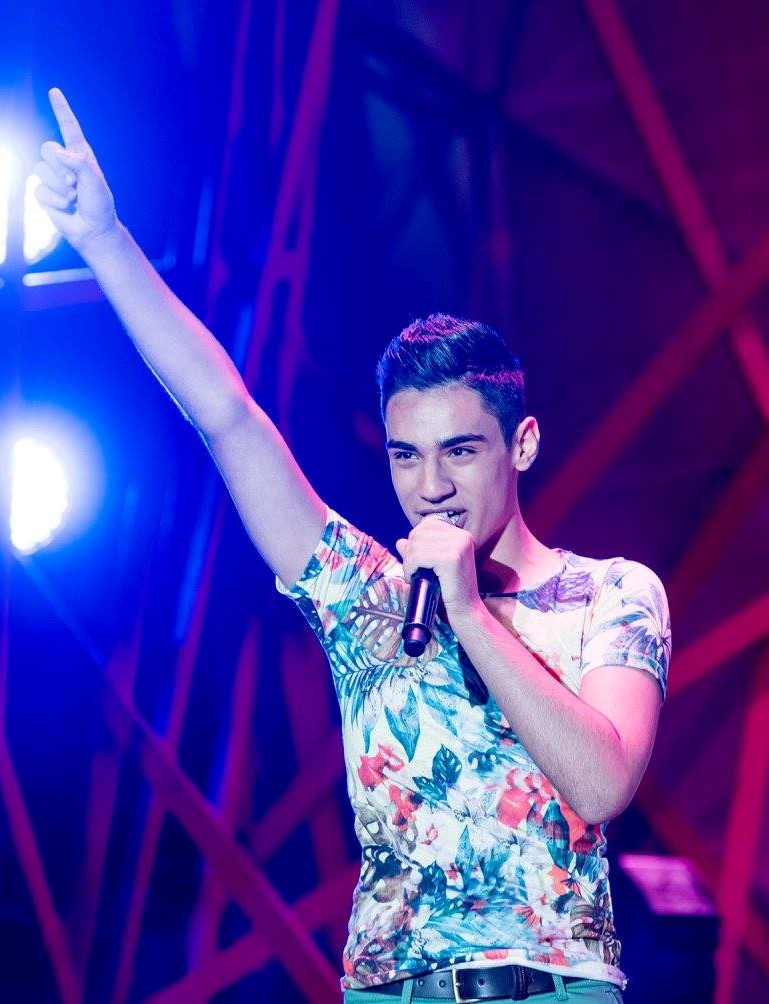
- Sebastian Calleja performing live at KKI 2016

Background information
- Born: 3 July 1998 (age 27)
- Origin: Qormi, Malta
- Genres: Pop, dance-pop
- Occupations: Singer, student, actor
- Years active: 2009–present

Sebastian Calleja is a Maltese singer. He started his singing career at the age of 11. Calleja is a resident singer, for the 5th year in a row on the now defunct program 'Hadd Ghalik', which is aired on the national Maltese television channel TVM. He performs some acting in various local pageants or shows which gave him the spotlight in 2017 and 2018 playing one of the leading roles in the different Good Friday Pageant organised by the inmates at Corradino Correctional Facility in Kordin, Malta, which had all the performances sold out. In 2016, he also was chosen (together with other 5 local singers) to be part of the song and music video for the Maltese version of the World Youth Day Song 2016 – 'Henjin li jhennu'.

== Biography ==
Calleja was born in Qormi, Malta. His singing career started at the age of 11, and he studied voice. In March 2016, he placed 1st in the Trinity College of London vocal exam. His vocal coach is Glen Vella. Apart from being a resident singer on the popular Maltese programme 'Hadd Ghalik', he has been invited many times to perform on other TV programmes; like 'The Entertainers' on NET Television (Malta), performing live with Mark Spiteri Lucas Band.

== Career ==
=== Acting ===
He played many main roles in various musicals and/or pageants over the years, on the local stage, including: 'Aida', 'Rumpilstilskin', 'Barnuza Blu', 'Katrin tal-Imdina', 'The Pantomime Sossy u Tezor Mitluf', 'Carmen', 'Dracula' and 'Star Child'. All this led him to have a leading role at the Good Friday 2017 and again in 2018 with a different storyline Pageant, organised by the inmates at Corradino Correctional Facility in Kordin, Malta, which had all the shows, both years, performed over 2 weeks and were sold out.

=== Konkors Kanzunetta Indipendenza (KKI) (Independence Song Contest) ===
2018: Sebastian submitted an original song for the Festival Kanzunetta Indipendenza 2018 (KKI2018) and made it through the final. The song titled 'Dak Li Taf' (What you know), written by Giovan Attard and Dominic Cini. On the 18th of September, the competition was tough, with 22 songs fighting for the win. Sebastian staged his song together with a dancer from A-Line Dance Academy by Alana Bondin. After an intense voting, Sebastian came 3rd overall and received a lot of praise for his show.

2017: Calleja submitted 2 original songs for the Festival Kanzunetta Indipendenza 2017 (KKI2017) which, as per regulation, each singer is only allowed to have 1 song in the competition, and the song which made it to the final was 'Triq Wahda' (One Road), which he performed together with the dancers from Kinetic Dance Studio, on 19 September 2017 and was broadcast live on NET Television (Malta). 'Triq Wahda' was later released with an original music video to accompany the lovely song.

2016: Calleja took part in the Independence Song Contest 2016, he submitted 3 original songs against a total of over 60 songs competing, all 3 songs made it to the top 20 for the final competition but every singer is only allowed to compete with 1 song, and the song which had more points was 'Bla Firdiet' (No Divisions). The final was on 19 September 2016, at The Granaries in Floriana, Malta which was aired live on NET Television (Malta). Calleja placed 9th in the final.

2014: Calleja, for the first time, took part in KKI 2014, with the song 'Kieku Taf' (If you knew) in the new talents/junior section. He dedicated the songs to all the mums around the world to show the respect every son has towards his mother.

=== San Marino Eurovision Song Contest casting 2018 ===
Calleja decided to take part in the Casting (performing arts) for San Marino's selection for their representative for the Eurovision Song Contest 2018 in Lisbon, Portugal. Over 1000 songs were submitted from different artists coming from all the countries in the world, with an online voting system. Calleja came 16th overall.

=== Ghanja tal-Poplu ===
2017: Calleja took part in the Ghanja tal-Poplu 2017, he submitted 2 original songs on his own, and one duet, and from over 130 songs submitted he made it through with the duet 'Mill-Ghatba L'Barra' which he performed together with Michela Dalli, live on 2 September 2017 in the Royal Opera House, Valletta (Pjazza Teatru Rjal) which was aired live on TVM.

=== OGAE Eurovision Song Contest Berlin, Germany ===
2017: Calleja, after winning the event the previous year (see below 2016), was invited to perform again as a guest and to pass the trophy to the 2017 winner. The winner for 2017 was the singer Rilli Willow representing Israel with her version of 'Ey Sham'. Calleja performed again his winning song from the previous year, 'Golden Boy,' and he officially released his new single and music video 'Escape'. For the joy of the fans present during the event, he performed a duet with his mentor Glen Vella with their cover of the song 'Fly on the Wings of Love'. Calleja was also invited to perform again on the Eurovision Cruise, but due to other prior commitments, he could not make it.

The OGAE Germany held this event in Berlin, Germany, with the partner fan club of Malta, as Calleja was the winner of the previous year, with the main event on 16 July as the previous year.

2016: Calleja was chosen to represent Malta in the OGAE Eurovision Song Contest 2016 in Berlin. He won this event by performing his version of 'Golden Boy'. He placed 1st with the jury's votes and 2nd in the viewers' votes, giving him the overall winning score of 216, leaving Portugal in 2nd place with 205 and Italy in 3rd with 172 points.

The OGAE Germany held this event in Berlin, Germany, in partnership with the fan club of the Netherlands, with pre-conferences and parties, with the main event on 16 July. 12 singers competed to win this event, each representing different countries, but the general idea is to spend a whole weekend together with the Eurovision Community, have parties as well as a Gala, get together and meet the other fans and celebrate Eurovision.

=== OGAE Eurovision Cruise Helsinki, Finland ===
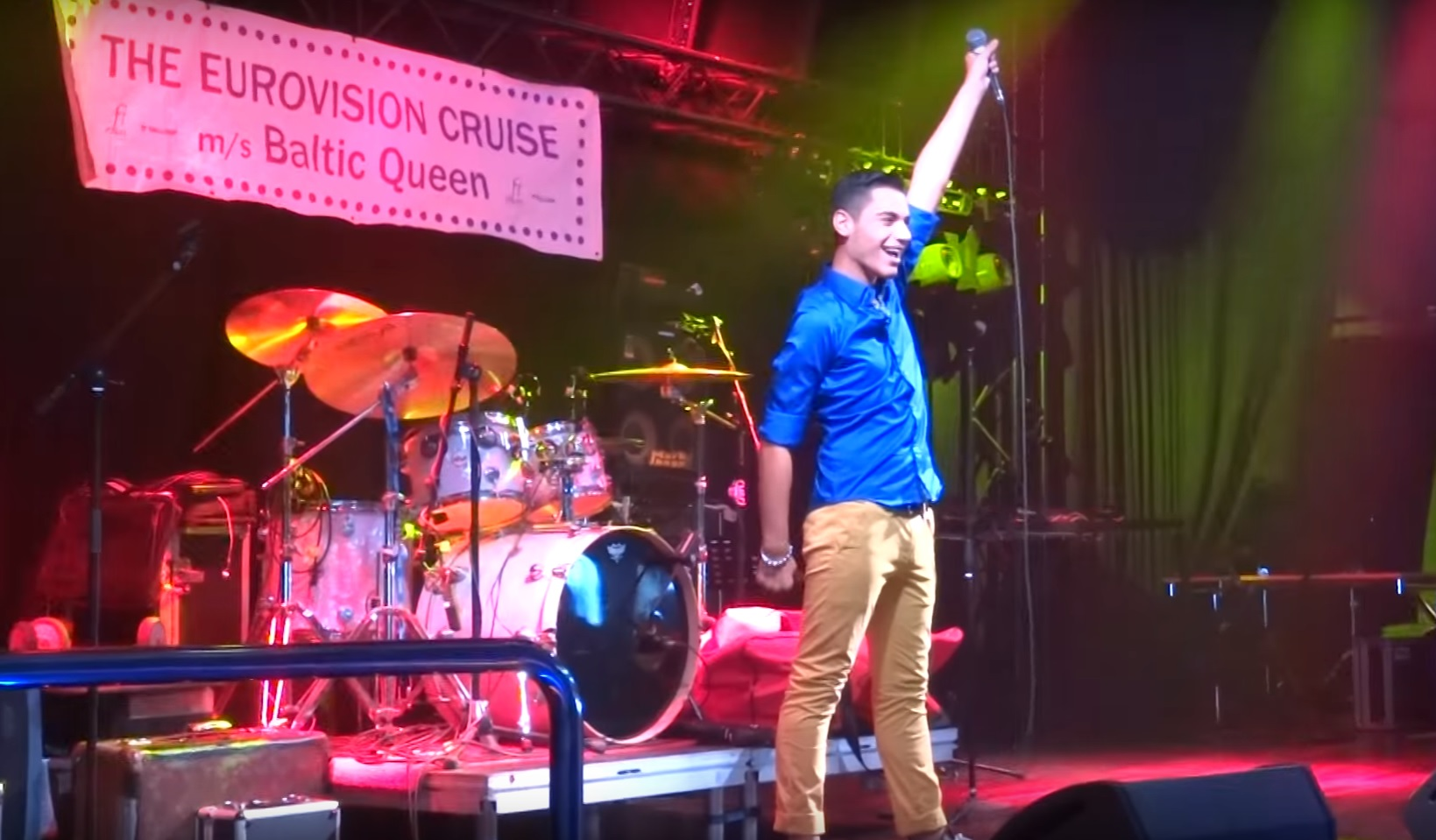
Calleja performing "Golden Boy" guest performance during the OGAE Eurovision Cruise 2016 in Helsinki

Calleja after winning the OGAE Eurovision Song Contest in Berlin Germany was invited to sing at the Eurovision Cruise that goes from Helsinki, Finland to Tallinn, Estonia.

During the cruise, he performed his winning song ‘Golden Boy’ and 2 other songs, which he covered. Among other performers, there was Eurovision Song Contest 2012 winner Loreen with her song 'Euphoria'.

He was also invited to sing during another cruise, which was organised for the said event, and also performed at the very popular ‘Hercules Club’ in Helsinki. He has also performed some songs in Maltese, one of them being his version of the song ‘Nghix biss ghalik’, which originally is of his vocal coach Glen Vella

=== Malta Eurovision Song Contest 2017 ===
Calleja entered the Malta Eurovision Song Contest 2017 in preparation for the great Eurovision Song Contest 2017 event, which was held in Ukraine. Calleja's song 'Escape' went through the first stage, entering the Top 60 from over 150 songs, but unfortunately, he did not make it to the final Top 16 from which the song which represented Malta was chosen.

=== Microfono D'Oro ===
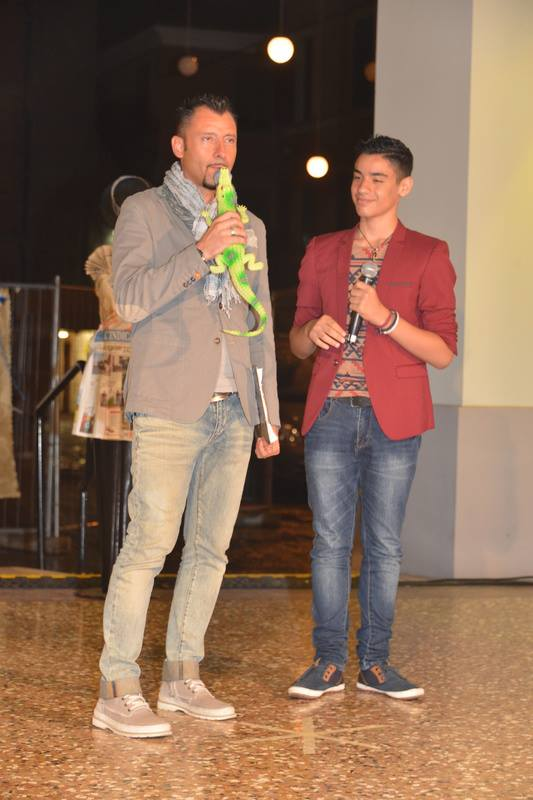
Calleja performing "Era Stupendo" at Microfono D'Oro, his second time in an international competition

Calleja was also chosen from the Maltese selections to represent Malta in the Microfono D'Oro 2014, held in Mirandola, Italy, with the cover version of Paolo Meneguzzi's song 'Era Stupendo', where he was placed 2nd from 25 competing artists from different countries and was aired live on Italian TV.

=== San Remo Junior ===
Calleja debuted in the Maltese selections for the San Remo Junior Contest in 2014 with the cover version of Ronan Keating's song 'If Tomorrow Never Comes'. He was chosen as one of the finalists to represent Malta in Italy's San Remo Junior. In Sanremo, Italy, he was one of the finalists in the competition, where he competed with other singers from various countries around Europe.

The following year, in 2015, he was invited as a guest (together with the other singers who participated in San Remo Junior 2014) to perform again during the 2015 San Remo Junior. For this occasion he performed his version of 'Cara Mia' together with the Artemocion Malta dancers.

== Charity ==
Calleja always tries to do his part in helping others. In 2016, he was one of the singers for the CD 'Helu Bambin 3' which raised funds for the 'Dar tal-Providenza' (a home for the impaired persons), and also in 2017 he was one of the singers for the Christmas official remake of 'Ninni La Tibkix Izjed'. Calleja also released a song in Maltese called 'L-Ghadu Tieghi', which is a CD and DVD with the music video is placed for sale with all proceeds going to the Malta Community Chest Fund, an organisation run by The President of Malta to help people in need.

Apart from the many times he performs for free in fundraising events all around the year, he is invited regularly to Correctional Facilities, for events organised regularly for the entertainment of the inmates.

== Other ==
Calleja has been invited many times to perform in various events, like village festas or events, the most popular when in 2017 he was invited to perform together with Ruslana, 2004 Eurovision Song Contest winner, at the Church of St Sebastian, Qormi village festa. He is also invited to sing in various local TV programmes on Maltese television.

== Singles (with music video) ==
- Fjur Fuq it-Tarmak (2019) – Part of the 2019/2020 'Don't Drink & Drive Campaign' organized by the Health Promotion and Disease Prevention Directorate and other local entities
- Touch (2019)
  - Reached No. 1 Klassifika tal-Aqwa 20 f'Malta (Malta's Top 20)
  - Spent 15 weeks in the charts Klassifika tal-Aqwa 20 f'Malta (Malta's Top 20)
  - One of the Best 20 Songs of 2019 according to GWIDA.MT
  - Winner of Best Music Video – Top Online Release of 2019 on Toni Sant's program 'Muzika Mod Iehor', after an online poll voting.
- Qalu Li Raw (Duet with Renato Micallef) (2019)
  - Reached No. 3 Klassifika tal-Aqwa 20 f'Malta (Malta's Top 20)
  - Winner of Best Music Video [bil-Malti] of 2019 on Toni Sant's program 'Muzika Mod Iehor', after an online poll voting.
- Triq Wahda (2018)
  - 2nd place in Best Music Video [Maltese language] of 2018 on Toni Sant's program 'Muzika Mod Iehor'
  - Reached No. 5 Klassifika tal-Aqwa 20 f'Malta (Malta's Top 20)
- Escape (2017)
  - Winner of Best Music Video [non-Maltese language] of 2017 on Toni Sant's program 'Muzika Mod Iehor', after an online poll voting.
- L-Ghadu Tieghi (charity dvd/cd) (2016)

== Singles (without music video) ==
- Dak Li Taf (2018)
- Mill-Ghatba 'l Barra (duet with Michela Dalli) (2017)
- Bla Firdiet (2016)
- Kieku Taf (2014)
