= Dimal =

Dimal may refer to

- Dimal (municipality), in Berat County, central Albania
- Dimal (rapper), from Ukraine
