= Dimal (rapper) =

Russian-Ukrainian rapper (born 1986)

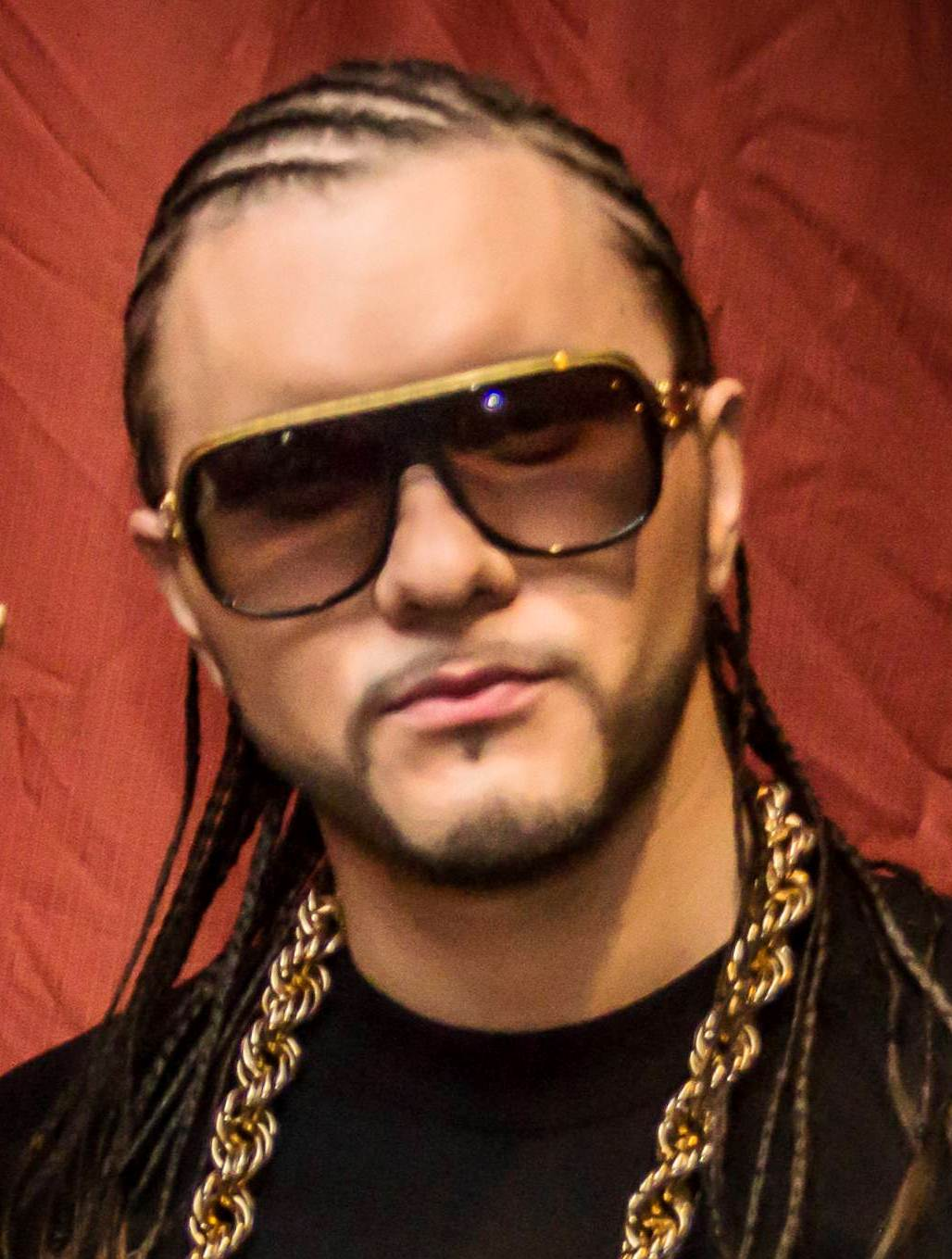
- at Bay Music Awards 2012

Background information
- Also known as: Russian and Fashion, Mr.Ladies Most Wanted, Multimilliardov
- Born: Gulyayev Dmitry Igorevich; 22 January 1986 (age 40); Sevastopol, Ukrainian SSR
- Genres: Hip hop, dance-pop
- Occupations: Rapper, singer, songwriter
- Years active: 2010–present
- Label: Unsigned

Gulyayev Dmitry Igorevich (born 22 January 1986), better known by his stage name Dimal /dɪmʌl/ (Russian: Димал), is a half-Russian, half-Ukrainian rapper, singer and songwriter based in Malta. He is also the founder and (CEO) of Russian Muziq Mafia Records in Ukraine.

== Early life ==
Dimal was born and raised in Sevastopol, Ukraine in the USSR in the eastern part of the Crimean Peninsula, where half of the population are Russians. He was born in a mixed family, with a Russian mother, Svitlana Agius, and Ukrainian father, Igor Gulyayev. His father left the family when he was just five years old.

Dimal had a passion for arts such as graffiti, singing, break dancing and martial arts such as boxing and taekwondo. At the age of six he attended music school, where he studied the violin. He began rapping at age of 15 and was a part of the rap group Zapadnya (Russian: Западня; lit. "Trap") and was also a member of the Key Clan, or just Keys. He left the Tavrida National V.I. Vernadsky University at his third grade, where he studied economics. At the age of 19 he moved to Malta.

== 2010: "Shake it" and Malta Music Awards ==
In 2010 Dimal released his first major single – featuring vocals from Maddee, a singer-songwriter from the UK – which received major air play in Malta. The song became very popular on Myspace and in a short time it reached over 3 million plays Later on that year, he was nominated for "Best Hip-Hop/R'n'B Artist" at the Malta Music Awards with such artists like Muxu, Kristina Casolani and Thea Saliba, and won. the award which was presented by CEO of MOBO Awards Kanya King. Also that year, Dimal had played in support of two international acts, Ja Rule and Flo Rida.

== 2011: "Go Low" and Eurovision ==
The single "Go Low", which also was featured Maddee, was released on 17 August 2011 and hit Malta's Top 10 Charts but only for few weeks. In October Dimal worked on a Eurovision song with Deborah C, and together they flew in Germany to record a song which was produced by Ralph Siegel – but they did not make it to the finals of the contest.

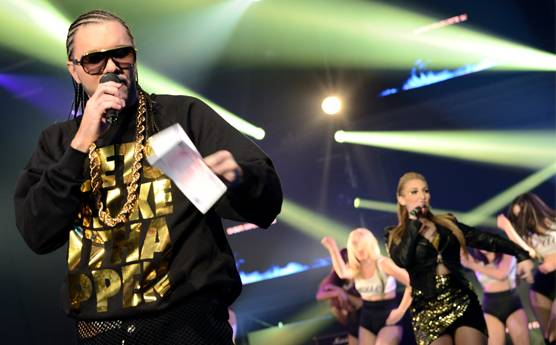
Dimal performing at the Bay Music Awards 2012

== 2012: "Lets Make It Happen" and Bay Music Awards ==
During the summer of 2012, Dimal teamed up with Maltese singer-songwriter Lyndsay Pace to release their song "Let's Make It Happen", which blends Dimal's rapping skills and Lyndsay's melodic vocals. The song did well on local and international radio charts including Malta's Top 10 Charts, PRS Top 40 Charts, Urban Top 20 Charts, among others. Most of the local DJ's picked up the song and put in their play lists. This led to the Bay Music Awards, where Dimal was nominated for "Best Newcomer". The song was also nominated for an award for "Top SIngle" in the MMI Listeners Picks Poll which is run by Toni Sant.

== 2013-present: IPMA ==
In January 2013 Dimal was nominated for the International Portuguese Music Awards in two categories, Best Dance Song and People's Choice Award. The show will be held on 2 February 2013 at the Zeiterion Theatre in New Bedford.

== Awards and honors ==
Year	Organisation	Award	Result
2010	Malta Music Awards	Best Hip-Hop and R'N'B Artist	Won
2010	The People's Music Awards	Best Dance/Electronica Song	Nominated
2010	The People's Music Awards	Best Hip Hop/Trip Hop/RnB Song	Nominated
2010	MMI Listeners Picks Poll	Top Online Release	Nominated
2011	MMI Listeners Picks Poll	Top Single (Go Low)	Won
2012	MMI Listeners Picks Poll	Top Single (Let's Make It Happen)	Nominated
2012	Bay Music Awards	Best Newcomer	Nominated
2012	Bay Music Awards	Viewer's Choice	Nominated
2013	IPMA	People's Choice Award	Nominated
2013	IPMA	Best Dance Song (Let's Make It Happen)	Nominated

=== Singles ===
Year	Singles	Charts			Weeks	Album
Year	Singles	BAY (MT)	PRS (MT)	UT20 (MT)	Weeks	Album
2010	"Shake It"	5	—	—	4	Non-Album Single
2011	"Go Low"	9	—	—	2	Non-Album Single
2012	"Let's Make It Happen" (feat. Lyndsay Pace)	3	3	17	14/20/2	Coming Soon
2012	"This Is Paceville"	—	—	—		Coming Soon
