= Malta in the Eurovision Song Contest 2010 =

- Eurovision Song Contest 2010
- Participating broadcaster: Public Broadcasting Services (PBS)
- Country: Malta
- Selection process: The GO Malta Eurosong 2010
- Selection date: 20 February 2010

Competing entry
- Song: "My Dream"
- Artist: Thea Garrett
- Songwriters: Jason Paul Cassar; Sunny Aquilina

Placement
- Semi-final result: Failed to qualify (12th)

Participation chronology

Malta was represented at the Eurovision Song Contest 2010 with the song "My Dream", written by Jason Cassar and Sunny Aquilina, and performed by Thea Garrett. The Maltese participating broadcaster, Public Broadcasting Services (PBS), selected its entry through the national final The GO Malta Eurosong 2010. The competition consisted of a semi-final round and a final, held between 9 December 2009 and 20 February 2010, where "My Dream" performed by Thea Garrett eventually emerged as the winning entry after scoring the most points from a five-member jury and a public televote.

Malta was drawn to compete in the first semi-final of the Eurovision Song Contest which took place on 25 May 2010. Performing during the show in position 11, "My Dream" was not announced among the top 10 entries of the first semi-final and therefore did not qualify to compete in the final on 29 May. It was later revealed that Malta placed twelfth out of the 17 participating countries in the semi-final with 45 points.

== Background ==
Prior to the 2010 contest, the Maltese Broadcasting Authority (MBA) until 1975, and the Public Broadcasting Services (PBS) since 1991, had participated in the Eurovision Song Contest representing Malta twenty-two times since MBA's first entry in 1971. After competing in 1975, Malta was absent from the contest beginning in 1976. The country had, to this point, competed in every contest since returning in 1991. Their best placing in the contest thus far was second, which it achieved on two occasions: in 2002 with the song "7th Wonder" performed by Ira Losco and in 2005 with the song "Angel" performed by Chiara. In 2009, "What If We" performed by Chiara qualified to the final and placed 22nd.

As part of its duties as participating broadcaster, PBS organises the selection of its entry in the Eurovision Song Contest and broadcasts the event in the country. The broadcaster confirmed its intentions to participate at the 2010 contest on 9 September 2009. The Maltese broadcaster had selected their entry consistently through a national final procedure, a method that was continued for its 2010 participation.

== Before Eurovision ==
=== The GO Malta Eurosong 2010 ===
The logo of The GO Malta Eurosong 2010

The GO Malta Eurosong 2010 was the national final format developed by PBS to select the Maltese entry for the Eurovision Song Contest 2010. The competition consisted of a semi-final held between 8 December 2009 and 13 January 2010, and a final held on 20 February 2010. All shows were broadcast on Television Malta (TVM), while the final was also broadcast on the official Eurovision Song Contest website eurovision.tv.

==== Format ====
The competition consisted of thirty-six songs competing in the semi-final which consisted of six shows with six songs each between 8 December 2009 and 13 January 2010, broadcast during the TVM talent show L-Isfida. The first show was initially scheduled to take place on 9 November 2009, but was delayed due to legal disputes between PBS and former chairwoman of the Maltese Eurovision selection Grace Borg regarding the prohibition of submissions from foreign songwriters. The top twenty entries qualified to compete in the final on 20 February 2010. Five judges evaluated the songs during the shows and each judge had an equal stake in the final result. In the semi-final, an additional two set of votes were the results of the votes submitted by the public via telephone and SMS, each having a weighting equal to the votes of a single judge. In the final, the results of the public televote had a weighting equal to the total votes of the judges.

==== Competing entries ====
Artists and composers were able to submit their entries between 1 and 30 October 2009. Both artists and songwriters were required to be Maltese or possess Maltese citizenship. Songwriters were able to submit as many songs as they wished, however, artists were only able to submit a maximum of one song. 123 entries were received by the broadcaster. The thirty-six songs selected to compete in the semi-final were announced on 4 December 2009. Among the selected competing artists was former Maltese Eurovision entrant Mike Spiteri who represented Malta in 1995 and Miriam Christine who represented Malta in 1996. The jury panel that selected the thirty-six semi-finalists consisted of Michelle Abela (Malta), Christian Axiak (Malta), Mariella Spiteri (Malta), Joe Tanti (Malta), Munro Forbes (Cyprus), Johanna van Lent-Singles (Netherlands) and Jeff Simpson (United Kingdom).

Artist	Song	Songwriter(s)
Aldo Busuttil	"Pizzicato"	Philip Vella, Alfred C. Sant
Ally	"Curiosity"	Elton Zarb, Gerard James Borg
Audrey Marie Bartolo	"Good Intentions"	Miriam Christine Borg, Rita Pace
Baklava	"Euphoria"	Philip Vella, Gerard James Borg
Claire Galea	"Ole Satchmo Blues"	Claire Galea, Erin Stewart Tanti, Claire Galea
Claudia Faniello	"Samsara"	Philip Vella, Gerard James Borg
Cynthia Attard	"If I Knew"	Miriam Christine, Gerard James Borg
Dario Bezzina	"Grave Dancers"	Chan Vella, Alexia Schembri
Dorothy Bezzina	"Moments"	Chan Vella, Alexia Schembri
Eleanor Cassar	"Choices"	Paul Giordimaina, Fleur Balzan
Eleanor Spiteri	"Velvet Ocean"	Paul Abela, Joe Julian Farrugia
Foxy Federation	"Fired Up"	Philip Vella, Gerard James Borg
Francesca Borg	"I Surrender"	Dominic Cini, Mario J. Caruana
Glen Vella	"Just a Little More Love"	Paul Giordimaina, Fleur Balzan
Godwin Lucas and Eve Daly	"The Best Years"	Carm Fenech
J. Anvil	"Mirage"	Andrew Zahra, Deo Grech
Jessica Muscat	"Fake"	Philip Vella, Gerard James Borg
Josef Tabone	"Who Cares?"	Elton Zarb, Rita Pace
Klinsmann	"Her Name Was Anne"	Jonathan Spiteri, Klinsmann Coleiro, Aldo Spiteri
Lawrence Gray	"Stories"	Ray Agius, Godwin Sant
Mike Spiteri	"Twenty Thousand Leagues"	Ray Agius, Alfred C. Sant
Miriam Christine	"Beautiful Contradiction"	Miriam Christine Borg, Gerard James Borg
Nadine Axisa and Clifford Galea	"Once in a Lifetime"	Jason Paul Cassar, Mario Farrugia
Pamela Bezzina	"Hold On"	Paul Giordimaina, Fleur Balzan
Petra Zammit	"All I Need"	Andrew Zammit, Keith Zammit
Priscilla and Kurt	"Waterfall"	Mark Debono, Rita Pace
Raquela	"Here I Am"	Philip Vella, Gerard James Borg
Richard Edwards	"Change"	Richard Micallef
Roger Tirazona	"Silver Rain"	Paul Abela, Joe Julian Farrugia
Rosman Pace	"Hypnotized"	Rosman Pace
Ruth Portelli	"Three Little Words"	Philip Vella, Gerard James Borg
Ryan Dale and Duminka	"One 4 U"	Ryan Dale, Jon Lukas
Silver Clash	"Broken"	Robert Parde
Thea Garrett	"My Dream"	Jason Paul Cassar, Sunny Aquilina
Tiziana Calleja	"Words Are Not Enough"	John David Zammit, Paul Callus
Wayne Micallef	"Save a Life"	Wayne Micallef

==== Semi-final ====
The semi-final phase took place over six shows between 9 December 2009 and 13 January 2010, all held at the Audiovision TV Studios in Hamrun and hosted by former Maltese Eurovision entrant Claudette Pace who represented Malta in 2000. Thirty-six songs competed for twenty qualifying spots in the final, which were announced on 16 January 2010. The allocation of the six entries competing in each show was announced on 8 December 2009.

Semi-final – 9 December 2009 – 13 January 2010
Broadcast	R/O	Artist	Song	Result
9 December 2009	1	Raquela	"Here I Am"	—N/a
9 December 2009	2	Ally	"Curiosity"	—N/a
9 December 2009	3	Richard Edwards	"Change"	—N/a
9 December 2009	4	Foxy Federation	"Fired Up"	Qualified
9 December 2009	5	Klinsmann	"Her Name Was Anne"	Qualified
9 December 2009	6	J. Anvil	"Mirage"	—N/a
16 December 2009	1	Aldo Busuttil	"Pizzicato"	—N/a
16 December 2009	2	Claudia Faniello	"Samsara"	Qualified
16 December 2009	3	Claire Galea	"Ole Satchmo Blues"	Qualified
16 December 2009	4	Godwin Lucas and Eve Daly	"The Best Years"	—N/a
16 December 2009	5	Josef Tabone	"Who Cares?"	—N/a
16 December 2009	6	Glen Vella	"Just a Little More Love"	Qualified
23 December 2009	1	Miriam Christine	"Beautiful Contradiction"	—N/a
23 December 2009	2	Thea Garrett	"My Dream"	Qualified
23 December 2009	3	Tiziana Calleja	"Words Are Not Enough"	Qualified
23 December 2009	4	Eleanor Spiteri	"Velvet Ocean"	Qualified
23 December 2009	5	Francesca Borg	"I Surrender"	—N/a
23 December 2009	6	Eleanor Cassar	"Choices"	Qualified
30 December 2009	1	Audrey Marie Bartolo	"Good Intentions"	Qualified
30 December 2009	2	Wayne Micallef	"Save a Life"	Qualified
30 December 2009	3	Ryan Dale and Duminka	"One 4 U"	Qualified
30 December 2009	4	Mike Spiteri	"Twenty Thousand Leagues"	—N/a
30 December 2009	5	Cynthia Attard	"If I Knew"	—N/a
30 December 2009	6	Dario Bezzina	"Grave Dancers"	—N/a
6 January 2010	1	Petra Zammit	"All I Need"	Qualified
6 January 2010	2	Pamela Bezzina	"Hold On"	Qualified
6 January 2010	3	Nadine Axisa and Clifford Galea	"Once in a Lifetime"	Qualified
6 January 2010	4	Priscilla and Kurt	"Waterfall"	Qualified
6 January 2010	5	Baklava	"Euphoria"	—N/a
6 January 2010	6	Rosman Pace	"Hypnotized"	—N/a
13 January 2010	1	Ruth Portelli	"Three Little Words"	Qualified
13 January 2010	2	Roger Tirazona	"Silver Rain"	—N/a
13 January 2010	3	Jessica Muscat	"Fake"	—N/a
13 January 2010	4	Silver Clash	"Broken"	Qualified
13 January 2010	5	Lawrence Gray	"Stories"	Qualified
13 January 2010	6	Dorothy Bezzina	"Moments"	Qualified

==== Final ====
The final took place on 20 February 2010 at the Malta Fairs & Convention Centre in Ta' Qali, hosted by Keith Demicoli and Pauline Agius with backstage commentary and interviews conducted by Owen Bonnici. The twenty entries that qualified from the semi-final were performed again and the 50/50 combination of votes of a five-member jury panel and the results of public televoting determined the winner. The show was opened with a guest performance of "What If We" performed by 1998, 2005 and 2009 Maltese Eurovision entrant Chiara, while the interval act featured performances by 1992 Maltese Eurovision entrant Mary Spiteri, 2008 Armenian Eurovision entrant Sirusho, the Dancel Dance Studio dance troupe and the local bands Chasing Pandora and Winter Moods. After the votes from the jury panel and televote were combined, "My Dream" performed by Thea Garrett was the winner.

Final – 20 February 2010
R/O	Artist	Song	Jury	Televote	Total	Place
1	Dorothy Bezzina	"Moments"	21	6	27	10
2	Foxy Federation	"Fired Up"	0	9	9	18
3	Lawrence Gray	"Stories"	21	12	33	7
4	Eleanor Spiteri	"Velvet Ocean"	25	14	39	5
5	Claudia Faniello	"Samsara"	3	28	31	8
6	Thea Garrett	"My Dream"	54	48	102	1
7	Priscilla and Kurt	"Waterfall"	6	13	19	12
8	Nadine Axisa and Clifford Galea	"Once in a Lifetime"	7	12	19	12
9	Glen Vella	"Just a Little More Love"	28	30	58	2
10	Audrey Marie Bartolo	"Good Intentions"	7	3	10	17
11	Klinsmann	"Her Name Was Anne"	10	16	26	11
12	Claire Galea	"Ole Satchmo Blues"	3	6	9	18
13	Wayne Micallef	"Save a Life"	27	9	36	6
14	Petra Zammit	"All I Need"	7	7	14	15
15	Ryan Dale and Duminka	"One 4 U"	7	6	13	16
16	Eleanor Cassar	"Choices"	5	11	16	14
17	Silver Clash	"Broken"	0	5	5	20
18	Tiziana Calleja	"Words Are Not Enough"	13	32	45	3
19	Ruth Portelli	"Three Little Words"	19	12	31	8
20	Pamela Bezzina	"Hold On"	27	13	40	4

Detailed Jury Votes
R/O	Song	Juror					Total
R/O	Song	1	2	3	4	5	Total
1	"Moments"	8		2	8	3	21
2	"Fired Up"						0
3	"Stories"	3	6	5	5	2	21
4	"Velvet Ocean"	4	8		3	10	25
5	"Samsara"	2	1				3
6	"My Dream"	12	12	12	6	12	54
7	"Waterfall"			4	2		6
8	"Once in a Lifetime"			6		1	7
9	"Just a Little More Love"	6	10	1	7	4	28
10	"Good Intentions"	7					7
11	"Her Name Was Anne"		3			7	10
12	"Ole Satchmo Blues"	1	2				3
13	"Save a Life"		4	3	12	8	27
14	"All I Need"		7				7
15	"One 4 U"				1	6	7
16	"Choices"		5				5
17	"Broken"						0
18	"Words Are Not Enough"	5		8			13
19	"Three Little Words"			10	4	5	19
20	"Hold On"	10		7	10		27

=== Promotion ===
Thea Garrett made several appearances across Europe to specifically promote "My Dream" as the Maltese Eurovision entry. On 15 April, Garrett took part in promotional activities in Slovakia and performed during the Eurovision in Concert event, which was held at the Lexion venue in Zaanstad, Netherlands on 24 April and hosted by Cornald Maas and Marga Bult. On 30 April, she appeared during the TV Limburg talk show Studio TVL and performed during the Pink Nation event which was held in Antwerp, Belgium. In addition to her international appearances, Thea Garrett also completed promotional activities in Malta where she appeared during the TVM talk show programme Xarabank on 21 May and performed the Maltese version of "My Dream", entitled "Ħolma".

== At Eurovision ==
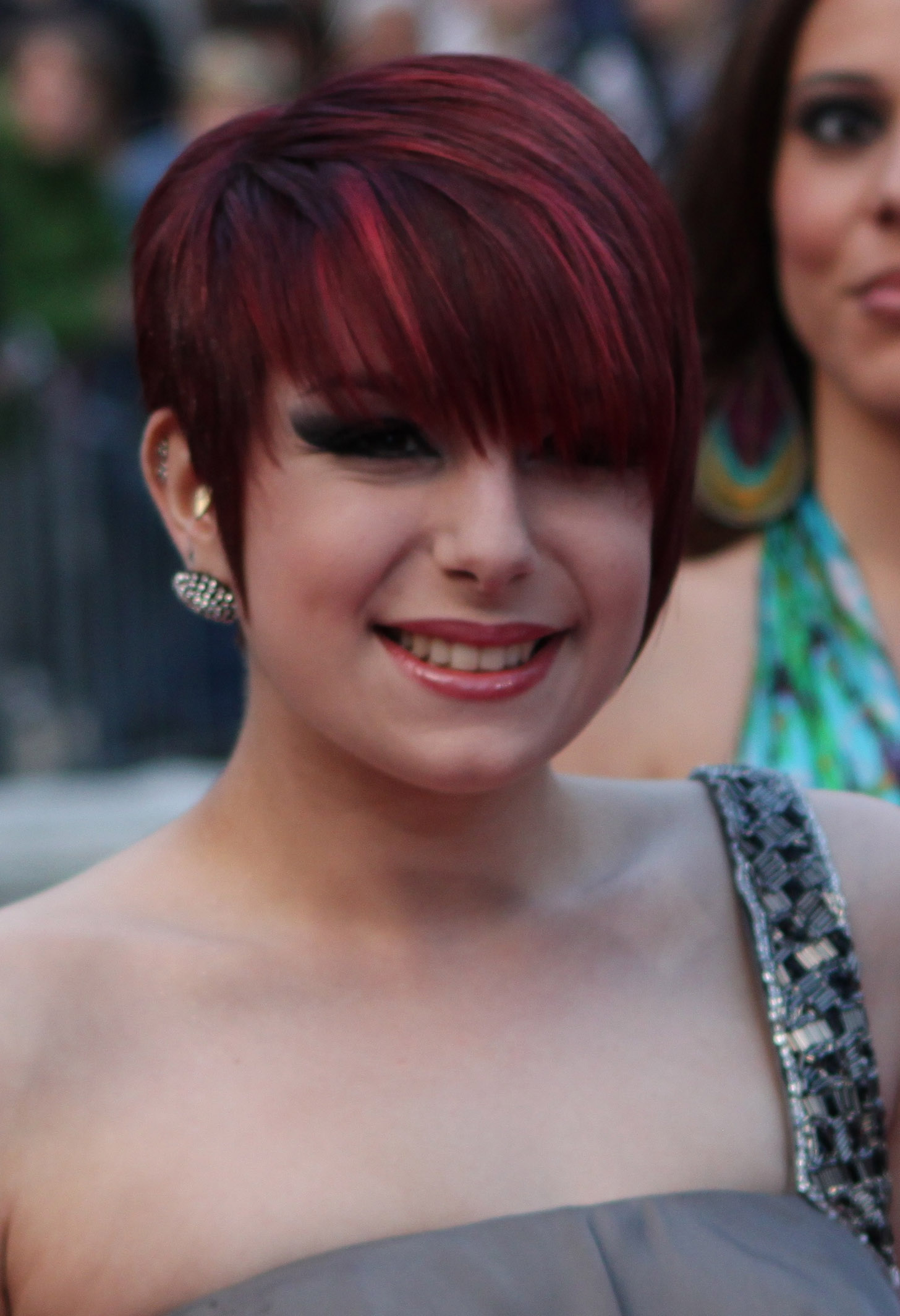
Thea Garrett at the Eurovision Opening Party in Oslo

The Eurovision Song Contest 2010 took place at the Telenor Arena in Oslo, Norway and consisted of two semi-finals on 25 and 27 May, and the final of 29 May 2010. According to Eurovision rules, all nations with the exceptions of the host country and the "Big Four" (France, Germany, Spain and the United Kingdom) are required to qualify from one of two semi-finals in order to compete for the final; the top ten countries from each semi-final progress to the final. The European Broadcasting Union (EBU) split up the competing countries into six different pots based on voting patterns from previous contests, with countries with favourable voting histories put into the same pot. On 7 February 2010, a special allocation draw was held which placed each country into one of the two semi-finals, as well as which half of the show they would perform in. Malta was placed into the first semi-final, to be held on 25 May 2010, and was scheduled to perform in the second half of the show. The running order for the semi-finals was decided through another draw on 15 March 2011 and Malta was set to perform in position 11, following the entry from Belgium and before the entry from Albania.

The two semi-finals and the final were broadcast in Malta on TVM with commentary by Valerie Vella. The Maltese spokesperson, who announced the Maltese votes during the final, was previous 1998, 2005 and 2009 contest entrant Chiara Siracusa.

=== Semi-final ===
Thea Garrett took part in technical rehearsals on 17 and 20 May, followed by dress rehearsals on 24 and 25 May. This included the jury show on 24 May where the professional juries of each country watched and voted on the competing entries.

The Maltese performance featured Thea Garrett wearing a grey and silver dress and performing together with three backing vocalists and one dancer dressed as a bird with a pair of white wings. In regards to the dancer, Garrett stated: "He is dressed as a seagull, as the seagull is one of the few birds that whatever comes his way, he still flies, and that's the message of the song. When you have a dream, no matter what comes for your way still reach for your dream." The performance began with the dancer gyrating around and moving his wings, and dancing behind Garrett towards the latter part of the song. The stage backdrop transitioned between dark colours to blue, white and black with spotlights beaming down onto the performers. The performance also utilised pyrotechnics and smoke effects. The backing vocalists that joined Thea Garrett on stage were Jes Sciberras, Nadine Axisa and Pamela Bezzina. The dancer featured during the performance was Jackie Pace Delicata.

At the end of the show, Malta was not announced among the top 10 entries in the first semi-final and therefore failed to qualify to compete in the final. It was later revealed that Malta placed twelfth in the semi-final, receiving a total of 45 points.

=== Voting ===
Voting during the three shows involved each country awarding points from 1-8, 10 and 12 as determined by a combination of 50% national jury and 50% televoting. Each nation's jury consisted of five music industry professionals who are citizens of the country they represent. This jury judged each entry based on: vocal capacity; the stage performance; the song's composition and originality; and the overall impression by the act. In addition, no member of a national jury was permitted to be related in any way to any of the competing acts in such a way that they cannot vote impartially and independently.

Following the release of the full split voting by the EBU after the conclusion of the competition, it was revealed that Malta had placed twelfth with the public televote and seventh with the jury vote in the first semi-final. In the public vote, Malta scored 40 points, while with the jury vote, Malta scored 66 points.

Below is a breakdown of points awarded to Malta and awarded by Malta in the second semi-final and grand final of the contest. The nation awarded its 12 points to Croatia in the semi-final and to Azerbaijan in the final of the contest.

==== Points awarded to Malta ====
Points awarded to Malta (Semi-final 1)
Score	Country
12 points	Slovakia
10 points	
8 points	
7 points	
6 points	Bosnia and Herzegovina; Macedonia
5 points	
4 points	Iceland
3 points	Estonia; Portugal
2 points	Albania; Belarus; Germany; Greece
1 point	Finland; Latvia; Spain

==== Points awarded by Malta ====
Points awarded by Malta (Semi-final 1)
Score	Country
12 points	Belgium
10 points	Iceland
8 points	Greece
7 points	Moldova
6 points	Albania
5 points	Belarus
4 points	Portugal
3 points	Bosnia and Herzegovina
2 points	Finland
1 point	Russia

Points awarded by Malta (Final)
Score	Country
12 points	Azerbaijan
10 points	Belgium
8 points	Denmark
7 points	Greece
6 points	Iceland
5 points	Romania
4 points	Germany
3 points	Norway
2 points	France
1 point	Portugal
