= Convincingly Better =

Studio album by Claudia Faniello
- Released: 16 August 2010
- Recorded: 2010
- Genre: Pop
- Length: 38:17
- Label: CAP-Sounds

Singles from Convincingly Better
- 1. "Samsara" Released: February 2010; 2. "I Hate This Song" Released: 3 August 2010

Convincingly Better is the debut album by Maltese singer Claudia Faniello. It was released on 20 August 2010 from CAP-Sounds.

== Track listing ==
1. "I'm Dangerous" – 3:06
2. "I Hate This Song" – 3:11
3. "I Want My Love Back" – 4:00
4. "I Need To Know" – 3:42
5. "Dilemma" – 3:02
6. "Convincingly Better" – 3:25
7. "Samsara" – 3:04
8. "Guardami" – 3:42
9. "Midas Touch" – 2:54
10. "Walk With Me" – 3:46
11. "I Hate This Song" (Club Mix) – 4:25

== Singles ==
- "I Hate This Song" was released in August 2010.
- "Samsara" was released in February 2010. It participated in The GO Malta Eurosong 2010.

== Release history ==
Region	Date	Format	Label
Malta	10 August 2010	CD, digital download	CAP-Sounds
