= Let's Make It Happen =

Single by Dimal featuring Lyndsay Pace
- Released: August 16, 2012
- Recorded: 2012
- Genre: dance-pop, Electro house
- Length: 3:23
- Songwriters: Dimal, Lyndsay Pace
- Producer: Ilya Ferre

"Let's Make It Happen" is a single recorded by rapper Dimal . The song features vocals by Maltese singer-songwriter Lyndsay Pace. It was recorded in Malta but produced, mixed and mastered in Moscow (Russia) by a very well known Russian composer Ilya Ferre in August 2012.

== Song Theme ==
The song is about nightlife, partying, having a good time. Some of the lyrics mention places like Ibiza, New York City, LA, Miami. The song references "Like A G6" by Far East Movement when it says "Well-known, Worldwide, Like G6 Im So Fly" and also it has some whispering parts saying "It's Hot, It's Hot, It's Hot" which can slightly remind you J-Kwon's song Tipsy .

== Music video ==
The 1st Music video was released on 12.12.12 on YouTube it has the Lyrics of the song in black and gold theme, it was also used during the performance at Bay Music Awards 2012 at Bay Arena Malta.

== Awards and nominations ==
In November 2012, the song was nominated in the category of Top Single at MMI Listeners Picks Poll which is run by Toni Sant

In January 2013, the song was nominated at International Portuguese Music Awards as Best Dance Song

== Press release ==
The Times of Malta published an article written by Michael Bugeja about the song.

== Track listing ==
- CD single
1. "Let's Make It Happen (Crowd On The Chorus)" – 3:23
2. "Let's Make It Happen (No Crowd On The Chorus)" – 3:23
- Digital download @ iTunes / @ Amazon
1. "Let's Make It Happen (Crowd On The Chorus)" – 3:23

== Chart performance ==
Year	Singles	Charts			Weeks	Album
Year	Singles	BAY (MT)	PRS (MT)	UT20 (MT)	Weeks	Album
2012	"Let's Make It Happen" (feat. Lyndsay Pace)	3	3	17	14/20/2	Coming Soon
