= Thea Garrett =

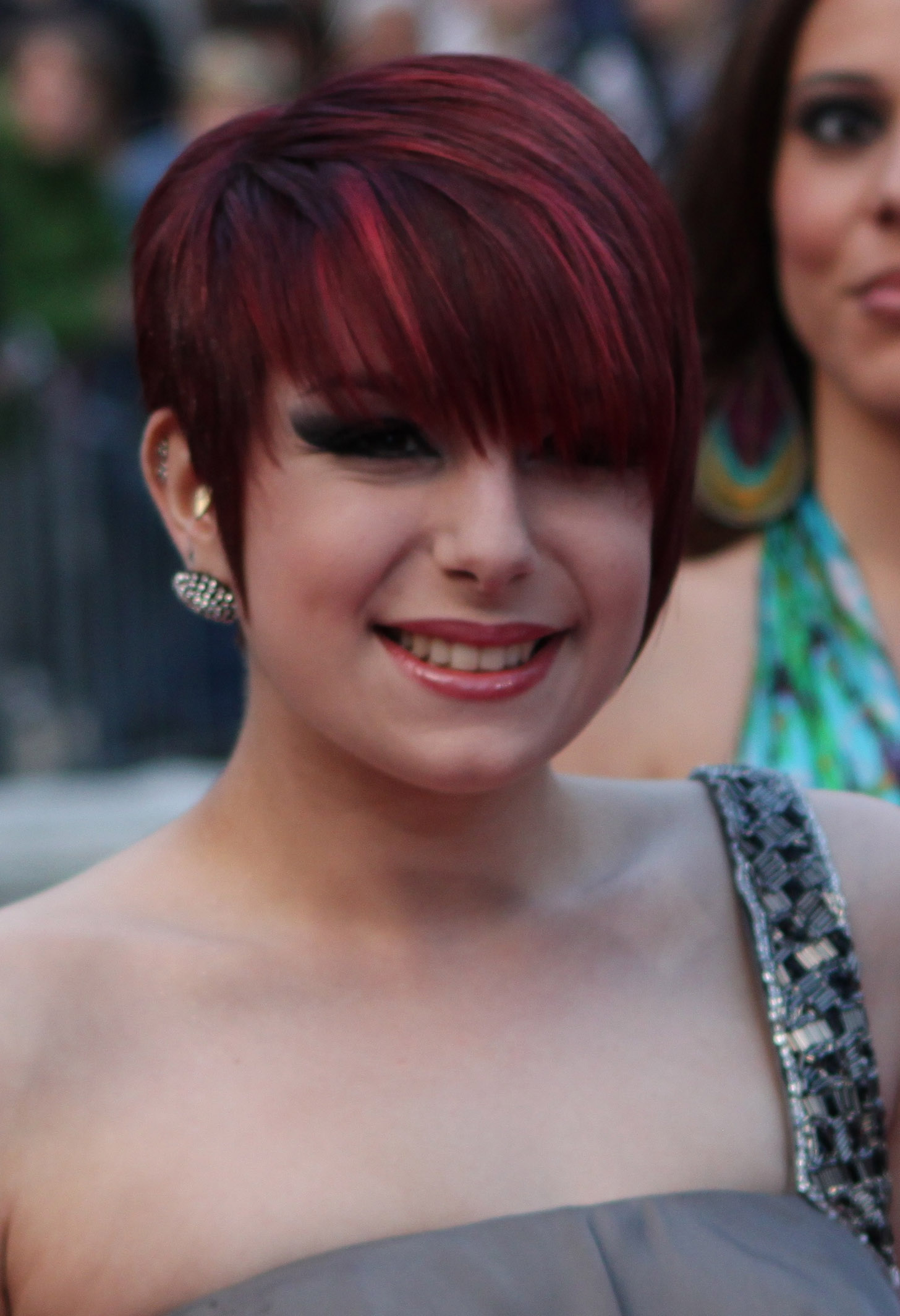
- Thea Garrett in Oslo (2010)

Background information
- Born: 15 March 1992 (age 34)
- Occupations: singer, actress, musical theatre performer

Thea Garrett (born 15 March 1992) is a Maltese singer and musical theatre performer who represented Malta in the Eurovision Song Contest 2010 in Oslo.

== Eurovision 2010 ==
In 2010, Garrett won the Maltese national final to represent Malta in the Eurovision Song Contest 2010 with the song "My Dream". Garrett performed in the first semi-final on 25 May 2010 in Oslo, Norway. but failed to qualify for the final, placing 12th and released her first single, Frontline.

== Singles ==
- My Dream (2010)
- Frontline (2011)
- Walk on By (2011)

Preceded by Chiara with What If We	Malta in the Eurovision Song Contest; 2010	Succeeded by Glen Vella with One Life
