= Hooligan (rapper) =

Maltese rapper

Hooligan/Hooli
- Also known as: Hooli
- Born: Johnston Farrugia; 23 September 1980 (age 46); Qrendi, Malta
- Genres: Hip hop; R&B
- Occupations: Rapper; songwriter
- Years active: 2002–present
- Label: Wickedandloud
- Website: Facebook page YouTube channel

Johnston Farrugia (born 23 September 1980), better known by his stage names Hooligan or Hooli, is a Maltese rapper. He is known for being a pioneer in hip hop music in the Maltese language.

== Life ==
Hooligan was born on 23 September 1980. When he was 13 years old, he became a fan of Snoop Dogg. At the age of 19, he moved from his hometown Qrendi to Żurrieq.

Hooli's career began in 2002, when he worked on the opening theme song of a Smash Television show. In February 2003, he released his debut album Oriġinali Bħali, and it was a hit in Malta. After this success, he performed in many musical events in Malta and Gozo.

In summer 2004, he released the single Nieħdu Buzz, which was followed by his second album Hooliġinali in 2006. Hooliġinali also included a music video of Nieħdu Buzz.

His third album, called Triloġinali, was released in July 2012. The album included a few tracks in English, and some songs combined Hooli's usual hip hop with dance music. Throughout his music career, Hooli has been acknowledged for his success in the music industry. He has won a number of awards and in 2013 he won best Hip Hop and R&B artist at the Malta Music Awards.

In 2014 and 2016 Hooli placed on top during the first two editions of the Hip Hop Freestyle contest Botta u Risposta.

Hooli has also represented Malta internationally with his latest being invited to accompany Amber Bondin on stage in a number of festivals in China. Hooli's music career opened new pastures when he was invited to participate in a reality show shot in Germany and Poland. Whilst in 2017 he hosted a road trip show filmed around Europe and aired on one of the main local TV stations.

In 2017, Hooli launched his new song and music video of Mument ta' Skiet.

Hooli was welcomed during the 2019 edition of Rock Opera Gensna, during which year the song Dak iz-Zmien made another hit in the local sphere.

Hooligan is a supporter of Manchester United F.C. and the England national football team.

== Discography ==
Studio albums

- Oriġinali Bħali (2003)
- Hooliġinali (2006)
- Triloġinali (2012)

Singles

- Nieħdu Buzz (2004)
- Mument tas-Skiet (2017)
- il-Melodija tat-Triq – ft. Digby (2018)
- Tipprovax – ft. Kapitlu 13 (2018)
- Dak iz-Zmien (2019)
- Fatum – ft. Carlo Borg Bonaci (2020)
- Tiftakar Pa (2021)
- Rispett – ft. Lokko (2021)
