= Beheaded (band) =

Maltese death metal band

Background information
- Origin: Fgura, Malta
- Genre: Death metal
- Years active: 1991–present
- Label: Unique Leader Records
- Members: David Cachia; Frank Calleja; Davide Billia; Simone Brigo; Fabio Marasco
- Website: www.MySpace.com/BeheadedMT

Beheaded is a Maltese death metal band. They were formed in 1991 by guitarist David Bugeja, and drummer Chris Brincat. They have performed in Europe and the US, and have released several albums.

== Biography ==
=== Formation and demo (1991 – 1995) ===
The band was founded in 1991 by drummer Chris Brincat and guitarist David Bugeja, becoming the first death metal band in Malta after Biblical Infamy (which also had David Cachia on Bass in its ranks). In the largely Catholic country, the band has claimed that it has encountered a lot of confrontation and negativity, also mentioning this in some interviews as being a major setback of the country. A demo tape called ‘Souldead’ was released in 1995, making it the first death metal studio recording released by a Maltese band, putting the country on the extreme music map. Souldead was made to circulate strongly in the fanzine and tape trading circuits of the era.

=== Record deal, debut album, and first tour (1996 - 1999) ===
1996 saw the band signing its first record deal with Sweden's X-Treme Records. The first album entitled Perpetual Mockery, was recorded at Temple Studios in June 1996. Unforeseen hindrances determined that the CD saw its release in early 1998. Even so, the release was again praised in many reviews including a 4K/5K review in Kerrang!, and 7/10 review in Terrorizer. Summer 1998 also saw the band embark for the first time outside Maltese shores to play shows in Czech Republic, Slovakia, and Germany. During this tour the band played opening shows for Vader, Dying Fetus, Defaced Creation and Deranged, as well as gigs with Fleshless. New material started to outline a more brutal and heavy approach in the songs.

=== Resurgence of Oblivion (1999 – 2001) ===
A five-track promo disc was recorded in 1999, which captured the attention of several record labels. However, the band opted to sign with Danish label Mighty Music. The same five tracks were released as the Resurgence of Oblivion MCD. In 2001, Beheaded composed all the songs for the upcoming Recounts of Disembodiment between January and May 2001. The recording took place once again at Temple Studios in June 2001 with sound engineer David Vella behind the mixing desk. ‘The European Extermination Tour’ took place throughout Europe in July 2001 which saw Beheaded headline alongside label mates Anasarca, stopping by at the Obscene Extreme Festival in the Czech Republic. 2001 was the year when Chris got endorsed by Paiste for his abilities on the drumkit.

=== Mighty Music and Recounts of Disembodiment (2002 – 2003) ===
Early 2002 saw the release of Recounts of Disembodiment on Denmark's Mighty Music, an album which went down well with the followers of this extreme form of music. Positive reviews cropped up, and many interviews were done in numerous publications, including a 9/10 review in Terrorizer Mighty Music also licensed the Resurgence of Oblivion MCD, and Recounts of Disembodiment CD to the US label, Forever Underground Records. April and May 2002 was the time when the first US tour took place. The tour included over 20 shows and boasted appearances at the Ohio Deathfest and New Jersey Metal Meltdown 4. Back in Europe, Beheaded took part in the Fuck the Commerce V festival in Germany.

=== Unique Leader and Ominous Bloodline (2004 – 2008) ===
2004 saw the band hit the European roads again on the ‘Beheaded Europe with Prejudice Tour’ along Belgian death metal band, Prejudice. Beheaded inked a new record deal with US label Unique Leader Records in April 2004. The Ominous Bloodline album was recorded in July and August 2004, at Temple Studios, Malta and Mastered at Imperial Mastering in the US. The album was officially launched on March 8, 2005. It marked a significant step forward for Beheaded, landing them spots in some of the major death metal festivals in Europe, including the NRW Deathfest and the Death Feast Open Air, both in Germany and Brutal Assault in the Czech Republic in 2008.

=== New lineup and Never to Dawn (2009 - present) ===
After various line-up changes, by the end of 2009 guitarist Omar Grech returned on guitars after a break from the band. In the same period of time, a new frontman, Frank Calleja, vocalist with Maltese band Slit, joined the band as the fourth permanent vocalist. In December 2009, the band performed live after a period of a year and a half. This was the first time that the band performed live as a quartet.

In 2010, Robert Agius, formerly known as Lord Trebor with Archaean Harmony, joined in as the second guitarist on this new line-up and performed live with the band in March 2010, in preparation for their performance at the Neurotic Deathfest that same year.

The band entered Temple Studios in Mistra Bay, Malta, on 29 October 2010 to record the fourth album called Never To Dawn, which was released under Unique Leader Records on November 6, 2012.

In January 2014, the band announced that founding member and long time drummer, Chris Brincat has left the band.

== Members ==
=== Current members ===
- David Cachia - bass, vocals (1992-)
- Frank Calleja - vocals (2009-)
- Davide Billia - drums (2014-)
- Simone Brigo - guitar (2015-)
- Fabio Marasco - guitar (2021-)

=== Former members ===
- Tyson Fenech - guitar (1994-1995)
- Marcel Scalpello - vocals (1991-1996)
- David Bugeja - guitar (1991-2003)
- Chris Brincat - drums (1991-2014)
- Lawrence Joyce - vocals (1996-2004)
- Chris Mintoff - guitar (2003-2009)
- Melchior Borg - vocals (2004-2009)
- Nick Farrugia - guitar (2008-2009)
- Robert Agius - guitar (2010-2014)
- Omar Grech - guitar (1996-2021)

== Discography ==
=== Albums ===
- Perpetual Mockery (1998)
- Recounts of Disembodiment (2002)
- Ominous Bloodline (2005)
- Never to Dawn (2012)
- Beast Incarnate (2017)
- Only Death Can Save You (2019)
- Għadam (2025)

=== EPs ===
- Resurgence of Oblivion - 2000

=== Demos ===
- Souldead - 1995
