= Freddie Portelli =

Maltese singer and songwriter (born 1944)

Freddie Portelli (born 5 May 1944 at St. Paul's Bay, Malta) is a Maltese singer and songwriter.

== Career ==
Portelli's career has spanned over 40 years, beginning as a member and chief songwriter of the group The Malta Bums. He toured America, Canada and Germany with the group for 5 months, and after returning to Malta in 1966, wrote the song "Viva Malta", and later, "Mur Hallini". His recordings have been released in Australia, Canada, America and England. Freddie was also the leader of the band "Black Train", with whom he released self penned hit records.

Portelli was a national water polo player, having been involved with his hometown's Sirens A.S.C., along with Neptunes WPSC and Valletta United W.P.C., winning the premier championships with every new team he joined. He was a player for Malta's national team, winning the International Independence Tournament cup in 1964; the same year he won the premier championship with Neptunes.

== Recognition and Awards ==
Freddie Portelli was awarded Ġieħ ir-Repubblika by the then President of Malta, Marie-Louise Coleiro Preca, and also received the golden medal and Ġieħ San Pawl il-Baħar. He was additionally awarded for being the best Maltese record seller, and was given a lifetime achievement award.
