= Claudia Faniello =

Maltese singer

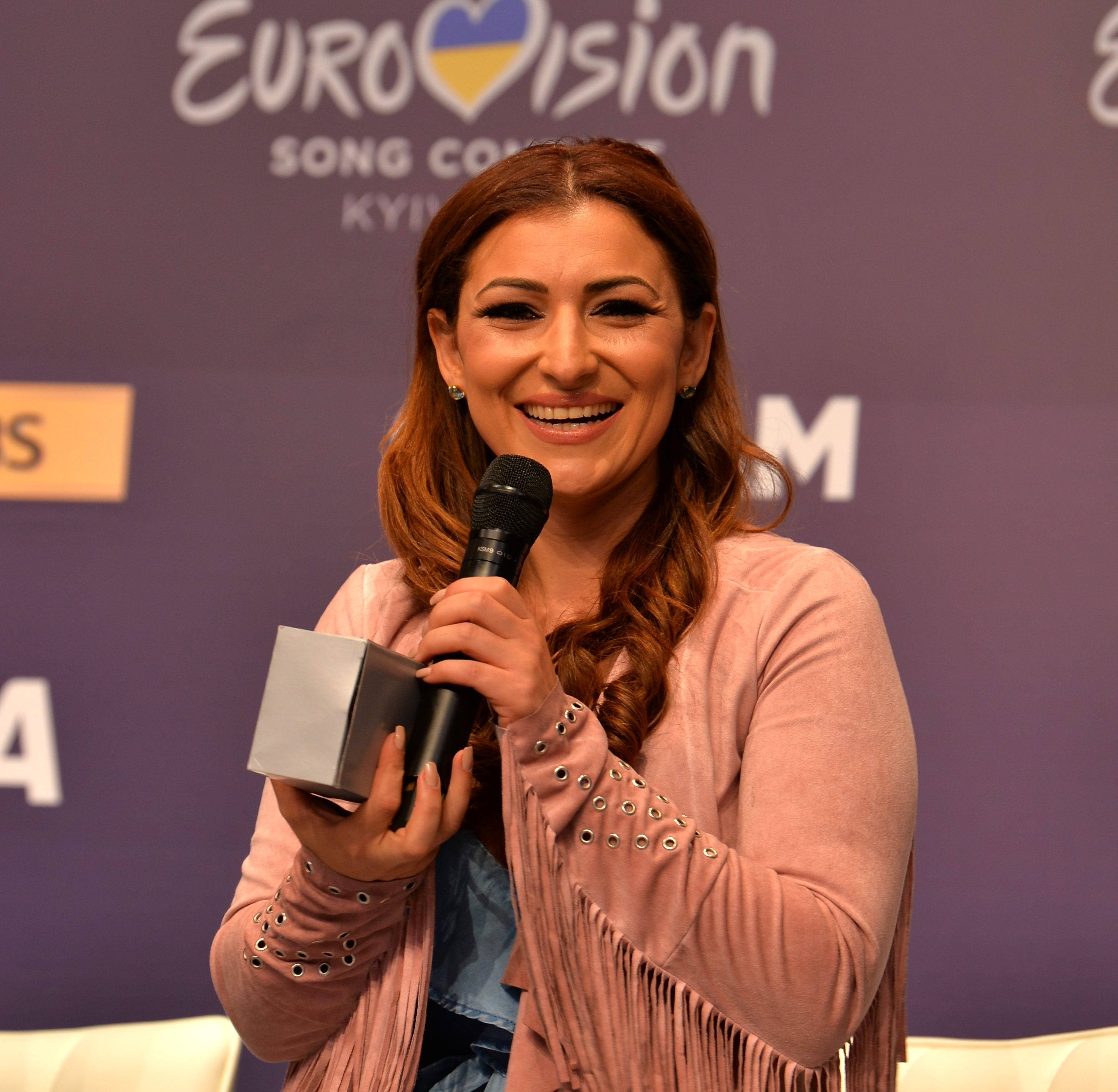
- Faniello in 2017

Background information
- Born: 25 February 1988 (age 38); Qawra, Malta
- Genres: Pop; R&B; soul
- Occupation: Singer
- Instrument: Vocals
- Years active: 2000–present

Claudia Faniello (born 25 February 1988) is a Maltese singer. She represented Malta in the Eurovision Song Contest 2017 with the song "Breathlessly". She came 3rd with the song Gmielek in the Maltese festival MuzikaMuzika 2022.

In October 2024, Faniello joined the long-running Maltese television program Sibtek as one of its co-hosts, alongside Ryan Borg and Josmar. Broadcast on TVM, Sibtek is a Saturday afternoon variety show featuring entertainment, interviews, and live music.

== Music videos and documentaries ==
In March 2023, Faniello released the official music video for "Ġmielek", which premiered during the Mużika Mużika festival in 2022. The video explores themes of inclusion through emotive visual storytelling and sign-language representation.

Alongside the music release, she was featured in a short documentary titled "Ġmielek", produced in early 2023. The feature highlights the stories of Maltese women with dyslexia, deafness, ADHD, and blindness, showcasing their experiences and celebrating diversity.

== Biography ==
=== Early career ===
Claudia was born and raised in Qawra, Malta, along with her siblings Fabrizio and Miriana. Her father is Italian. At the age of twelve, Claudia began to participate in a variety of television shows and participating also in many festivals and placing in top positions. In 2001, at the Phoenicia Hotel in Malta, she won the 'Talentissimi Juniors' – a show organised by 'Actreact'. A year later she sang live with Malta's National Orchestra in aid of impoverished children at the University of Malta. She was accompanied by Malta's ambassadors in the Eurovision Song Contest 2004, Julie & Ludwig and also her brother Fabrizio.

At the Mediterranean Conference Festival, in 2003 she sang at a concert with Fabrizio Faniello while a year later she sang again with the National Orchestra with Nadine Axisa, Fabrizio and Philippa. In 2005, she classified fourth on Hotspot – a TV show programmed on Net TV. The year 2006 was the year when she started her experience in the Malta Song For Europe Festival with the song "High Alert!" – a song composed by Ray Agius. At the same contest she won the award for best newcomer.

She won the Festival Kanzunetta Indipendenza 2006 with the song "Ma Nafx" – a song composed by Ray Agius. In 2007, despite qualifying for the Malta Song for Europe 2007 Semi-Final with the song "L-Imħabba Għamja" (Love is Blind), she wasn't part of the six songs that gained the right to compete for the final round. She finished 7th.

=== 2006–2016: Maltese national selection competitions for Eurovision ===
Year	Song	Place
2006	"High Alert"	12th
2007	"L-Imħabba Għamja"	7th
2008	"Caravaggio"	2nd
2008	"Sunrise"	3rd
2009	"Midas Touch"	DNQ (Heat 2)
2009	"Blue Sonata"	4th
2010	"Samsara"	8th
2011	"Movie in my Mind"	9th
2012	"Pure"	2nd
2013	"When it's Time"	7th
2017	"Breathlessly"	1st

In summer 2007, Claudia Faniello launched "Wild Flower", a song composed by Aldo Spiteri and written by Deo Grech. In 2008, she passed for the Go Malta Song for Europe Semi-Final Festival with two songs "Caravaggio" and "Sunrise". Both songs passed into the final eight songs. In the final of this festival she finished 2nd with the song "Caravaggio", a song about the Italian artist with the same name and 3rd with the song "Sunrise". The successive year, she made her fourth appearance in this Maltese festival, but still wasn't part of the last three songs that fought to book a place in Moscow 2009. She finished fourth with her song entitled "Blue Sonata", composed and written by Ray Agius. She qualified to the final in the Go Malta Eurosong 2010 with the song "Samsara" composed by Philip Vella and written Gerard James Borg. She finished eighth with 31 points. She released her first album entitled Convincingly Better in August 2010. In the Go Malta Eurosong 2011 final Faniello ended in ninth place with her entry "Movie in my Mind". In the Go Malta Eurosong 2012 final Faniello reached second place with her entry "Pure".

=== 2017: National final and Eurovision ===
Faniello represented Malta in the Eurovision Song Contest 2017 after winning the national final with the song "Breathlessly". She performed in the second semi-final on 11 May 2017, where she placed 16th out of 18 contestants, thus failing to qualify to the finale.

=== After Eurovision ===
In August 2019 she released a new single named "Fallin".

In June 2020 she released a new single called 'Say'.

In October 2021 she released a new single called 'When is it'.

== Discography ==
=== Albums ===
Title	Details
Convincingly Better	Released: 16 August 2010; Label: CAP-Sounds; Format: digital download

=== Singles ===
Title	Year	Album
"Ma Nafx"	2006	Non-album singles
"High Alert!"	2006	Non-album singles
"Wild Flower"	2007	Non-album singles
"L-imhabba ghamja"	2007	Non-album singles
"Caravaggio"	2008	Non-album singles
"Sunrise"	2008	Non-album singles
"Blue Sonata"	2009	Non-album singles
"Samsara"	2010	Convincingly Better
"I Hate This Song"	2010	Convincingly Better
"Movie in My Mind"	2011	Non-album singles
"Pure"	2012	Non-album singles
"When It's Time"	2013	Non-album singles
"One Fine Day"	2014	Non-album singles
"Miles Away"	2015	Non-album singles
"You Said"	2016	Non-album singles
"Breathlessly"	2017	Non-album singles
"Fallin"	2019	Non-album singles
"Say"	2020	Non-album singles

Awards and achievements
Preceded by Ira Losco with "Walk on Water"	Malta in the Eurovision Song Contest; 2017	Succeeded by Christabelle with "Taboo"
