= Winter Moods =

Maltese rock band

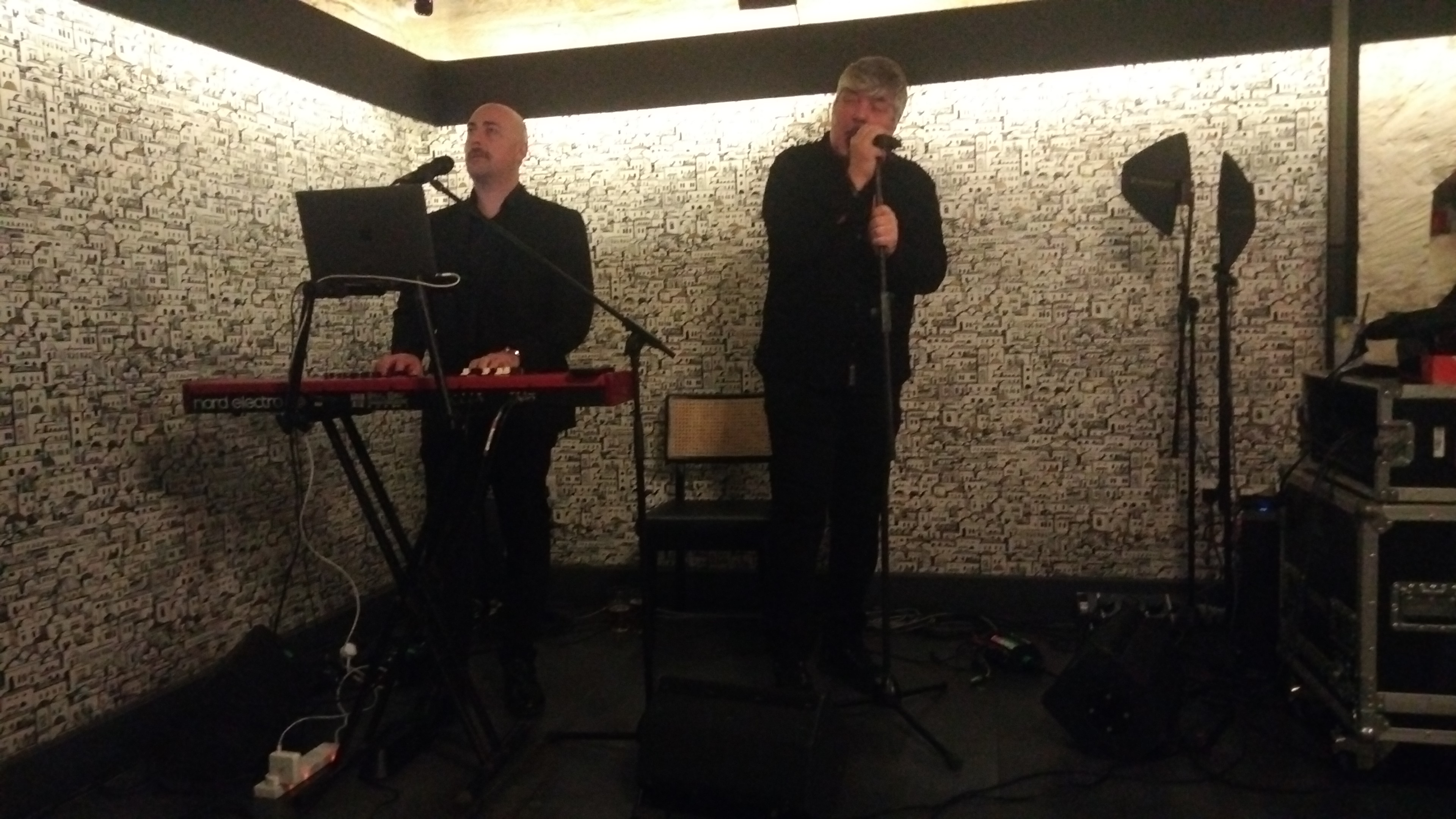
Winter Moods performing during MED5 in Birgu, Malta in 2025

Winter Moods is a Maltese band formed in the mid-1980s. During the past thirty years the band produced has five albums, and broke local records for attendance with two concerts, one on July 9, 2008, and the other one on July 30, 2010, the latest being attended by more than 10,000 fans, the largest number ever for a Maltese band.

== Biography ==
Winter Moods formed in the mid-eighties, consisting of Joeseph Rizzo (bass), Steve Caruana Smith (guitar) and Ivan Grech (vocals), practicising in a garage in Senglea on cold grey days to put together original songs. Thus the mood, thus the name of the band – Winter Moods.

Etienne Robinich later joined on keyboards. Winter Moods released their first single ‘Sarah’. This song remains one of the band's most popular tracks to this day. ‘Sarah’ was included in the band's first CD album released in 1996. Self-titled Winter Moods, the album was reminiscent of the members’ original influences.

Guitarist Melvin Caruana was the last member to join the band in 1997. Shortly after, in 2000, the band went on to launch their next CD album, ‘Morning Ale’ which produced hit songs ‘Jamaica’, ‘Ride’ and ‘Everyday Song’ – awarded the best song of all time by the Bay Music Awards in 2005.

Winter Moods’ third CD album, ‘Butterfly House’ was released in April 2003. It featured the hit ‘Come To You’, and following on its predecessor's success, this album reached the top of the local charts within days of its release. Winter Moods’ fourth album ‘Ordinary Men’ combines the band's musical expertise with new styles. ‘Ordinary Men’ became the band's best selling album to date, and includes the band's most famous song ‘Marigold’.

The band's youngest member Karl Fenech joined in 2009 to play on drums.

Winter Moods launched a new album ‘Argento’ in 2010 and with a major concert which took place on The Granaries in Floriana on the 30th of July.

On 9 July 2008, the band performed in front of over 7500 people, the largest ever Maltese crowd to attend a paying concert.

On 30 July 2010, Winter Moods managed to break their own record when they performed in front of the biggest ever crowd to attend a concert by a Maltese band. Over 10,000 fans were in attendance for this record breaking event at The Granaries in Floriana.

Winter Moods also performed alongside Maroon 5, Enrique Iglesias and Akon in the Isle of MTV Malta Special. In 2007 the band supported the CiaO’Scia concert held in Malta featuring Claudio Baglioni, Gianni Morandi and Riccardo Cocciante. Baglioni sang Winter Moods’ ‘Marigold’ together with the band.

Winter Moods performed at number of music festivals in Europe. In June 2000, the band performed at the Belfort Rock Festival in France, in September 2002 Winter Moods participated at the National Youth Rock Festival in Cyprus. In July 2003 Winter Moods were invited to perform at the Hard Rock Café in Rome. In 2004, following the success in German radio WDR2's competition – Europa XXL, where Winter Moods placed first amongst 10 bands from Europe, and was invited to perform at the Ring Fest held in Cologne, Germany.

== Awards ==
Over the years Winter Moods garnered several awards. The band was voted as the Best Band at six editions of the Malta Music Awards (1997, 2001, 2003, 2007, 2008, 2010). In 2007 Winter Moods received the Best Song award for their single ‘Marigold’ and again in 2010 for their song 'My Neverland'. Ivan Grech twice won the award for Best Song Writer, in 2007 and 2010. In 2008 the band was awarded the Legends Award – the first time such an award was handed out.

During the Bay Music Awards 2004 Winter Moods were awarded the Icon Award for their ongoing contribution to the Maltese music scene and for the success their singles have had on 89.7 Bay. During the Bay Music Awards 2005 the band won best single of the year award for ‘Closer’ and the best single of all time award for ‘Everyday Song’. In 2007 the band garnered a further three BMAs this time for Best Band, Best Song (Marigold) and the Viewers’ Choice.

== Band members ==
- Ivan Grech (vocals and keyboards)
- Joseph Rizzo (Bass)
- Melvin Caruana (acoustic and electric guitars)
- Etienne Robinich (keyboards)
- Karl Fench (Drums)

== Albums ==
- Winter Moods (1996)
- Morning Ale (2000)
- Butterfly House (2003)
- Ordinary Men (2006)
- Argento (2010)
- The Journey (2014)
