= Glen Vella =

Maltese singer (born 1983)

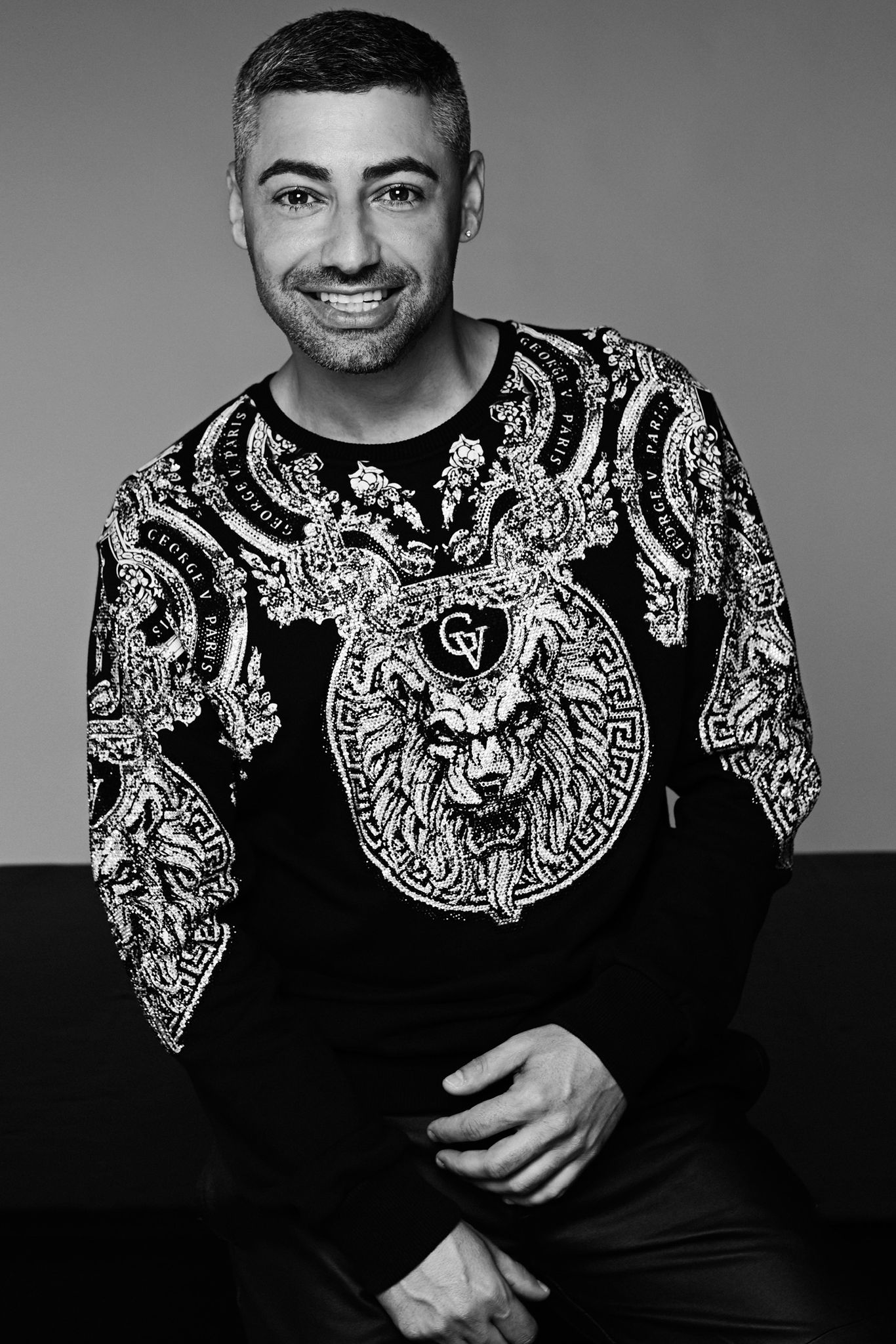
- Glen Vella in 2023

Background information
- Born: 14 May 1983 (age 43)
- Origin: Fleur-de-Lys, Malta
- Genre: Pop
- Occupation: Singer · Songwriter · Vocal Coach
- Years active: 2000–present
- Spouse: Sandro Zammit (m. 2020)
- Website: gvstudiomt.com

Glen Vella (born 14 May 1983) is a Maltese singer, songwriter, and vocal coach. He studied voice and piano from a young age and later earned a qualification in voice coaching from the Victoria Music and Arts College in London.

== Career ==
Vella became active in the Maltese music and television industry in the mid-2000s, recording jingles and theme songs and participating in musical theatre productions. In 2009, he received the Jury Award at the Golden Stag International Festival in Romania.

He was one of the lead vocalists of Elfejn u Tmintax, the choral symphony which premiered on the steps of St John’s Co-Cathedral during the Valletta 2018 opening celebrations.

In 2020, Vella presented the children’s television programme Kaxxa Daqq on TVM. In March 2024, he performed alongside Italian singer Gigi D'Alessio at the Vernal Festival held at the Malta Fairs and Conventions Centre (MFCC) in Ta’ Qali. In May 2024, he performed as a supporting act for American singer Anastacia at the Summer Lust Music Festival in Għaxaq, alongside Kurt Calleja. In May 2026, he performed as a supporting act for the German synth-pop band Alphaville together with his band at the Summer Lust Music Festival in Għaxaq, Malta.

He has participated in the Mużika Mużika festival and has also represented Malta in the Eurovision Song Contest.

In addition to his performance career, he works as a vocal coach, mentoring emerging Maltese artists.

== Eurovision Song Contest ==
Year	Event	Role	Song	Result
2005	Malta Song for Europe	Contestant	"Appreciate"	6th
2008	Malta Song for Europe	Contestant (with Pamela)	"Loved by You"	Semi-finalist
2009	Malta Eurosong	Contestant (with Q)	"Live for Today"	Semi-finalist
2009	Malta Eurosong	Contestant (with Q)	"Before You Walk Away"	3rd
2010	Malta Eurosong	Contestant	"Just a Little More Love"	2nd
2011	Malta Eurovision Song Contest	Contestant	"One Life"	1st
2011	Eurovision Song Contest	Representative (Malta)	"One Life"	11th (Semi-final 1)
2015	Malta Eurovision Song Contest	Contestant	"Breakaway"	3rd
2023	Malta Eurovision Song Contest	Co-host	—	—

== Mużika Mużika ==
Year	Performed by	Role	Song	Result
2000	Glen Vella (with Eleonor Cassar)	Performer	"Meta Naf Li Inti Tħobbni"	2nd
2021	Glen Vella	Performer	"Ħarsa Biss"	1st
2021	Avenue Sky	Composer	"Kompli Tbissem"	Finalist
2022	Bloodline	Composer (with Elton Zarb)	"Mewġ"	Semi-finalist
2023	Jasmine Abela	Composer	"M’Hawnx Bħalek"	3rd
2024	GIADA	Composer	"Imħabba Vera"	Finalist
2025	Claudia Faniello	Composer	"Supereroj"	Finalist
2025	Jasmine Abela	Composer	"L-Imħabba Verità"	Finalist
2026	Jasmine Abela	Composer	"Nistaqsi"	1st
2026	Jessica ft. J Joy	Composer	"Sensazzjoni"	Finalist

== Awards ==
- 2nd place - Festival Tal-Kanzunetta Maltija (2000) (with Eleonor Cassar) with "Meta Naf Li Inti Tħobbni"
- Jury Award – Golden Stag International Festival (2009)
- 3rd place – GO Malta EuroSong (2009) (with Q) with “Before You Walk Away”
- 2nd place – Malta Eurovision Song Contest (2010) with “Just a Little More Love”
- Winner – Malta Eurovision Song Contest (2011) with “One Life”
- 3rd place – Malta Eurovision Song Contest (2015) with “Breakaway”
- Winner – Mużika Mużika (2021) with “Ħarsa Biss”
- People’s Choice Award – Pride Awards (EuroPride Valletta 2023) for contributions to the LGBTIQ+ community
- 3rd place – Mużika Mużika (2023) as composer for “M’ Hawnx Bħalek” (performed by Jasmine Abela, lyrics by Philip Vella)
- Winner – Mużika Mużika (2026) as composer for “Nistaqsi” (performed by Jasmine Abela, lyrics by Philip Vella)

== Discography ==
=== Singles ===
- 2005: "Appreciate"
- 2008: "Loved By You" (with Pamela)
- 2009: "Live For Today" (with Q)
- 2009: "Before You Walk Away" (with Q)
- 2010: "Just A Little More Love"
- 2011: "One Life"
- 2012: "Lest Ngħix Biss Għalik"
- 2012: "Lie"
- 2014: "Dak Li Jien"
- 2015: "Breakaway"
- 2021: "Ħarsa Biss"
- 2022: "Tagħna 2"
- 2023: "Ħarsa Biss" (Remix)
- 2026: "Issa Naraw" (with Amber)
- 2026: "Logħob Li Jgħaqqadna" (Malta School Games 2026 Anthem Song)

Preceded by Thea Garrett with My Dream	Malta in the Eurovision Song Contest; 2011	Succeeded by Kurt Calleja with This is The Night
