= Toni Sant =

Maltese academic (born 1968)

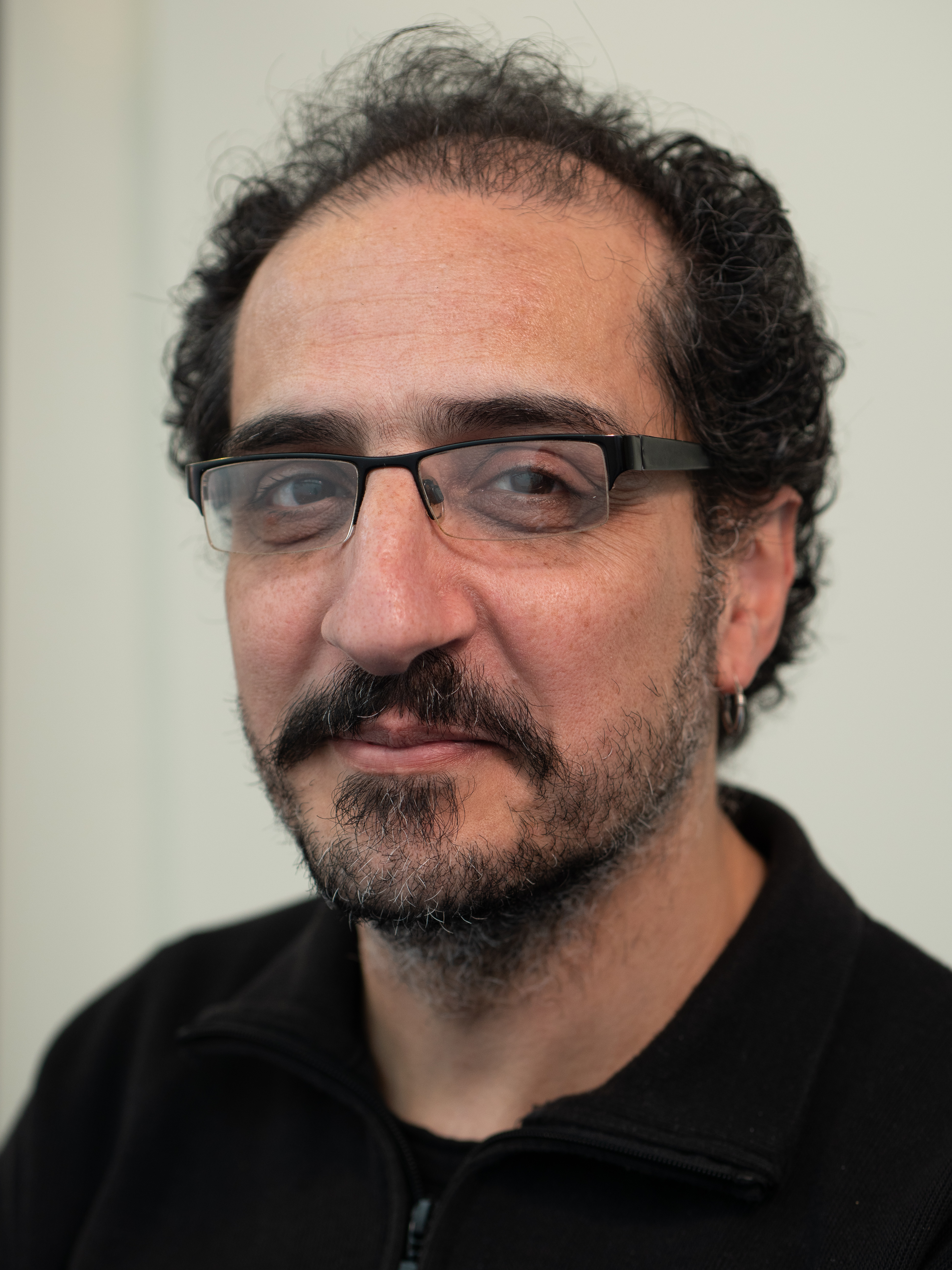
- Toni Sant at Wikimedia Summit 2019
- Born: 1968 (age 57–58)
- Occupations: Director of Digital Media & Film Production
- Employer: Salford University
- Known for: Franklin Furnace & the Spirit of the Avant-Garde
- Sant's voice recorded February 2017
- Website: ToniSant.com

Toni Sant (born 1968) is a Maltese academic and former radio and television presenter, producer, music journalist and Wikimedian. He is Director of Digital Media & Film Production at Salford University and was formerly Reader in Digital Curation at the University of Hull's School of Arts & New Media on the Scarborough campus.

== Education ==
Sant has a B.A. in Theatre Studies from the University of Malta and an M.A. and Ph.D. in performance studies from New York University. His publications include the book Franklin Furnace & the Spirit of the Avant-Garde: A History of the Future, about the Franklin Furnace Archive arts organisation in New York.

== Career ==
Sant joined Radio Malta in 1986 as a journalist on music programmes such as Kważi Kull Filgħaxija (1988/89), Mill-Garaxx (TVM, 1989/90), Il-Fil tat-Tiġdid (1989), Mal-20 bid-Daqq (1989/90), Immaġina: John Lennon (Radio Malta, 1990), Blast (TVM, 1990), Tutti Frutti (TVM, 1991). His television career included commentary for Malta at the 1991 Eurovision Song Contest.

In December 1991, Sant left TVM to begin a career as television and radio producer and programme manager for Radio One Live which produces Music programmes. Sant also remained associated with TVM as he produced music programmes for the station.

Sant was previously Senior Lecturer in Performance & Creative Technologies and Director of Research in the School of Arts and New Media at the University of Hull.

He has also been Education Organiser for Wikimedia UK. He is the artistic director of Spazju Kreattiv (formerly the St James Cavalier Centre for Creativity), Malta's national centre for creativity.

Currently Sant remains associated with music by broadcasting podcasts on his website.

== Bibliography ==
- Franklin Furnace & the Spirit of the Avant-Garde: A History of the Future. Intellect. 2011. ISBN 9781841503714.
- Remembering Rediffusion in Malta: A history without future?. Midsea Books. 2016. ISBN 9789993275688.
- Sant, Toni, ed. (2017). Documenting Performance: The Context and Processes of Digital Curation and Archiving. Bloomsbury. ISBN 9781472588180.
