= Eleanor Cassar =

Maltese singer

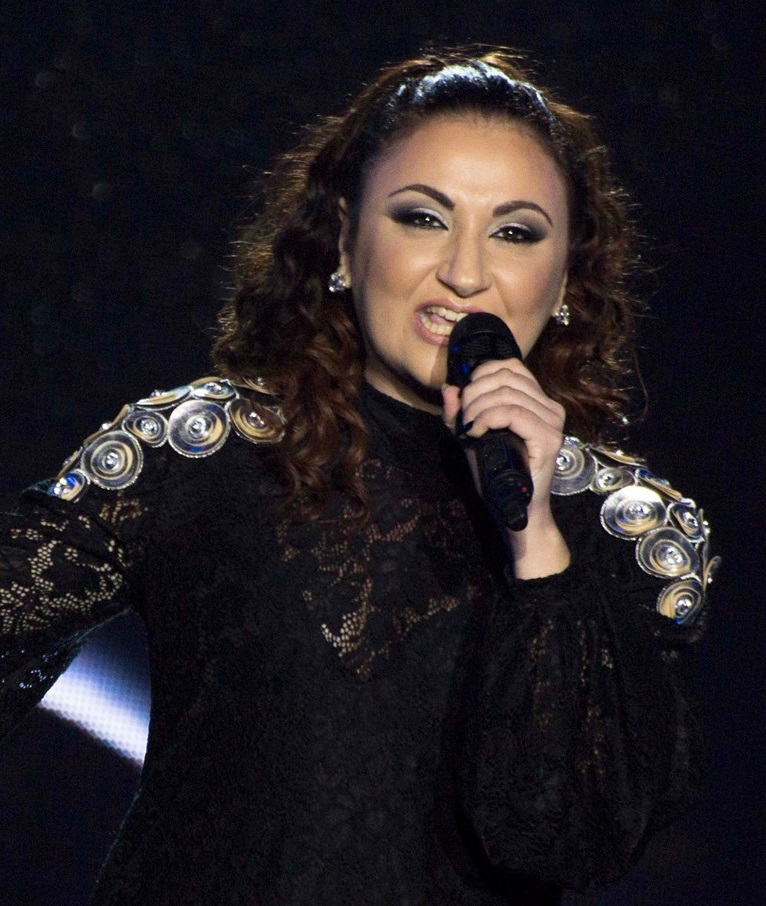
- Eleanor Cassar in 2018

Background information
- Also known as: Eleanor
- Born: 29 September 1982 (age 43); Luqa, Malta
- Genres: Pop
- Occupation: Singer
- Years active: 1992–present

Eleanor Cassar (born September 29, 1982) is a Maltese pop singer. She won the 2004 Golden Stag Festival.

== Early life and education ==
Eleanor Cassar was first introduced to music at age 6, as part of her school choir. She was first noticed by her teacher in Secondary school, who encouraged her at participate at musical and theatrical events. The same teacher encouraged her to take singing seriously.

Cassar has a certificate of merit from the University of London.

== Career ==
In 2001, Cassar won the first prize at the Discovery Song Festival in Varna, Bulgaria.

In 2002, she won the first prize at The People's Song Festival.

In 2004, she won the Golden Stag Festival, the largest music festival in Europe behind Eurovision. Her win with the song "If Love You Give" also marked the first time a Maltese singer had won the event. Cassar won both the first prize at the Super One festival and the prize for Best Interpretation offered by FIDOF.

In September 2005, she sang at the Astana Song Festival in Astana, Kazakhstan.

In 2006, Eleanor Cassar won the Malta International TV Song Festival with "Bniedem Iehor" by songwriters Paul Giordimaina and Fleur Balzan.

She represented Malta at the Universe Song Festival 2007 in Tenerife, Canary Islands (Spain) where she won the first prize, again.

In 2008, Cassar competed in a song contest in Kazakhstan which celebrated the 10th anniversary of Astana, the country's capital. Her duet with Paul Giordimaina, "The Envy Of The World", won the pair the Best Song Award and the Astana City Award. The song and an accompanying video were used in tourism campaigns for Astana.

In 2010, Cassar released the album Signify. The album included a number of songs Cassar had previously performed in contests and festivals, all of which were composed by Paul Giordimaina, with lyrics by Fleur Balzan. That same year, Cassar performed "Choices" at Malta Eurosong.

In 2018, Cassar sang in a musical Passion play in Valletta, produced by the Valletta 2018 Foundation.

=== Influences ===
Cassar enjoys soul, funk, and rock music, and has cited Celine Dion as a musical influence.

== Maltese Eurovision Selection ==
Cassar has competed in the Song for Europe Festival, Malta's Eurovision Selection contest, nine times between 2003 and 2018. In 2003, she participated for the first time with the songs "Someday You'll See" and "Tell Me Why".

Cassar's highest placement in the Maltese Eurovision Selection was second place in 2009, with the song "Someday"; she finished only three points behind the winner.

Entries in the Maltese Eurovision Selection
Year	Song	Composers	Placement	Ref
2003	"Someday you will see"	Mark Debono, Doris Chetcuti	7th	
2003	"Tell me why"	Eugenio Schembri, Doris Chetcuti	9th	
2004	"Through all my life"	Paul Giordimaina, Fleur Balzan	7th	
2005	"He"	Ralph Siegel, John O'Flynn	10th	
2006	"Tell Me"	Paul Giordimaina, Fleur Balzan	11th	
2008	"Give me a chance"	Paul Giordimaina, Fleur Balzan	4th	
2009	"Someday"	Paul Giordimaina, Fleur Balzan	2nd	
2009	"This is our life"	Paul Giordimaina, Fleur Balzan	Unplaced	
2011	"Hypnotized"	Paul Giordimaina, Fleur Balzan	10th	
2012	"I Want To Runaway"	Paul Giordimaina, Fleur Balzan	Unplaced	
2018	"Back to Life"	Jonas Gladnikoff, Michael James Down	5th	

== Personal life ==
Cassar has a daughter.

== Discography ==
=== Albums ===
- Signify (2010)

=== Singles ===
- "Back to Life" (2018)

Preceded by Sho Baoliang	Winner of the Golden Stag Festival; 2004	Succeeded by Linda Valori
