= Kurt Calleja =

Maltese singer

- Born: 5 May 1989 (age 36); Hamrun, Malta
- Genres: Pop, dance
- Occupation: Singer
- Years active: 2005–present
- Website: kurtcalleja.com

Kurt Calleja (born 5 May 1989) is a Maltese singer. He represented Malta in the Eurovision Song Contest 2012 in Baku, Azerbaijan with the song "This Is the Night". The song qualified from the second semi-final into the Eurovision final, where it finished 21st.

In 2022 he scored another hit with "Bla Tarf", a Maltese-language song with which he won the festival Mużika Mużika. He also competed in the national selection to choose the Maltese representative for the Eurovision Song Contest in 2025 with the single "AZIZ/A", but did not win.

== Discography ==
=== Singles ===
- 2010 – "Waterfall" (with Priscilla Psaila)
- 2011 – "Over and Over"
- 2012 – "This Is the Night"
- 2012 – "Boomerang"
- 2013 – "Leap Of Faith"
- 2013 – "Love on Mars"
- 2022 – "Bla Tarf"
