= Malta in the Eurovision Song Contest 2016 =

- Eurovision Song Contest 2016
- Participating broadcaster: Public Broadcasting Services (PBS)
- Country: Malta
- Selection process: Artist: Malta Eurovision Song Contest 2016; Song: Internal selection
- Selection date: Artist: 23 January 2016; Song: 14 March 2016

Competing entry
- Song: "Walk on Water"
- Artist: Ira Losco
- Songwriters: Lisa Desmond; Tim Larsson; Tobias Lundgren; Molly Pettersson Hammar; Ira Losco

Placement
- Semi-final result: Qualified (3rd, 209 points)
- Final result: 12th, 153 points

Participation chronology

Malta was represented at the Eurovision Song Contest 2016 with the song "Walk on Water", written by Lisa Desmond, Tim Larsson, Tobias Lundgren, Molly Pettersson Hammar, and Ira Losco, and performed by Losco herself. The Maltese participating broadcaster, Public Broadcasting Services (PBS), had initially selected its entry through the national final Malta Eurovision Song Contest 2016. The competition consisted of a semi-final round and a final, held on 22 and 23 January 2016, respectively, where "Chameleon" performed by Losco eventually emerged as the winning entry after scoring the most points from a five-member jury and a public televote. The rules of the selection allowed for the winning artist to change the winning song either partially or entirely with the consent of the winning composers. In February 2016, PBS announced that a jury panel consisting of international and local experts would determine the song Losco would ultimately perform at the Eurovision Song Contest from a selection of ten songs, including a revamped version of "Chameleon". On 14 March 2016, PBS announced that Losco would perform "Walk on Water"; the song was released to the public on 17 March. Losco had previously represented Malta in 2002 where she achieved second place with the song "7th Wonder".

Malta was drawn to compete in the first semi-final of the Eurovision Song Contest which took place on 10 May 2016. Performing as the closing entry during the show in position 18, "Walk on Water" was announced among the top 10 entries of the first semi-final and therefore qualified to compete in the final on 14 May. It was later revealed that Malta placed third out of the 18 participating countries in the semi-final with 209 points. In the final, Malta performed in position 22 and placed twelfth out of the 26 participating countries, scoring 153 points.

== Background ==
Prior to the 2016 contest, the Maltese Broadcasting Authority (MBA) until 1975, and the Public Broadcasting Services (PBS) since 1991, have participated in the Eurovision Song Contest representing Malta twenty-eight times since MBA's first entry in 1971. MBA briefly competed in the contest in the 1970s before withdrawing for sixteen years, while PBS competed in every contest since their return in 1991. Their best placing thus far was second, achieved on two occasions: 2002 with the song "7th Wonder" performed by Ira Losco, and in 2005 with the song "Angel" performed by Chiara. In 2015, "Warrior" performed by Amber failed to qualify to the final.

As part of its duties as participating broadcaster, PBS organises the selection of its entry in the Eurovision Song Contest and broadcasts the event in the country. The broadcaster confirmed its intentions to participate at the 2016 contest on 30 September 2015. The broadcaster selected its entry consistently through a national final procedure, a method that was continued for its 2016 participation.

== Before Eurovision ==
=== Malta Eurovision Song Contest 2016 ===
Malta Eurovision Song Contest 2016 was the national final format developed by PBS to select the Maltese entry for the Eurovision Song Contest 2016. The competition consisted of a semi-final and final held on 22 and 23 January 2016, respectively, at the Mediterranean Conference Centre in the nation's capital city of Valletta. Both shows were hosted by actor Ben Camille and broadcast on Television Malta (TVM) as well on the broadcaster's website tvm.com.mt, while the final was also broadcast on the official Eurovision Song Contest website eurovision.tv.

==== Format ====
The competition consisted of twenty songs competing in the semi-final on 22 January 2016 where the top fourteen entries qualified to compete in the final on 23 January 2016. Five judges evaluated the songs during the shows and each judge had an equal stake in the final result. The sixth set of votes were the results of the public televote, which had a weighting equal to the votes of a single judge. Ties in the final results were broken based on the entry which received the higher score from the judges. The five members of the jury that evaluated the entries during both the semi-final and final consisted of:

- Nick Clark-Lowes (United Kingdom) – Video editor/designer having worked in international shows with well-known artists
- Vyara Ankova (Bulgaria) – General manager of the Bulgarian National Television (BNT)
- Sabrija Vulić (Montenegro) – Head of Delegation for Montenegro at the Eurovision Song Contest
- Luke Fisher (United Kingdom) – Journalist specializing in the Eurovision Song Contest
- Quinton Scerri (Malta) – Television producer and presenter

The rules and regulations for the competition allowed for the artist, author and composer of the winning entry to change parts of the winning song or the entire song for the Eurovision Song Contest.

==== Competing entries ====
Artists and composers were able to submit their entries between 29 and 30 October 2015 to the PBS Creativity Hub in Gwardamanġa. Artists were also required to submit a cover version of another song along with their entry application. Songwriters from any nationality were able to submit songs as long as the artist were Maltese or possessed Maltese citizenship. Artists were able to submit as many songs as they wished, however, they could only compete with a maximum of two in the semi-final and one in the final. 2015 national final winner Amber was unable to compete due to a rule that prevented the previous winner from competing in the following competition. 153 entries were received by the broadcaster. On 3 December 2015, PBS announced a shortlist of 49 entries that had progressed through the selection process. The twenty songs selected to compete in the semi-final were announced on the TVM programme Xarabank on 11 December 2015. Among the selected competing artists was former Maltese Eurovision entrant Ira Losco who represented Malta in the 2002 contest, and Daniel Testa who represented Malta in the Junior Eurovision Song Contest 2008.

==== Semi-final ====
The semi-final took place on 22 January 2016. Twenty songs competed for fourteen qualifying spots in the final. The running order for the semi-final was announced on 13 January 2016. The show was opened with a guest performance by the 2015 Maltese Eurovision entrant Amber performing "Warrior", while the interval act featured performances by the local bands the Crowns and the New Victorians.

Semi-final – 22 January 2016
R/O	Artist	Song	Songwriter(s)	Result
1	Ira Losco	"Chameleon"	Ira Losco, Talkback	Advanced
2	Corazon	"Falling Glass"	Sara Ljunggren, Georgios Kalpakidis, Jonas Gladnikoff	Advanced
3	Stefan Galea	"Light Up My Life"	Ylva Persson, Linda Persson	—N/a
4	Domenique	"Empty Hearted"	Dimitri Stassos, Ylva Persson, Linda Persson	—N/a
5	Dario	"I Love You"	Henric Pierroff, Sandra Nordstrom	—N/a
6	Daniel Testa	"Under the Sun"	Daniel Testa, Elton Zarb, Matthew Mercieca	Advanced
7	Jessika	"The Flame"	Philip Vella, Gerard James Borg	Advanced
8	Jasmine	"Alive"	Paul Abela, Michael James Down, Marie Pettersson, Filip Lindfors	Advanced
9	Raquel	"Flashing Lights"	Elton Zarb, Matthew Mercieca	Advanced
10	Brooke	"Golden"	Christian Schneider, Aidan O'Connor, Sara Biglert, Brooke Borg	Advanced
11	Kim	"Lighthouse"	Cyprian Cassar, Matthew Mercieca	Advanced
12	Sarah Crystal	"Right Here with You"	Toby Farrugia, Pamela Bezzina, Sarah Crystal	—N/a
13	Danica Muscat	"Frontline"	Philip Vella, Emil Calleja Bayliss	—N/a
14	Christabelle	"Kingdom"	Elton Zarb, Matthew Mercieca	Advanced
15	Franklin	"Little Love"	Cyprian Cassar, Matthew Mercieca	Advanced
16	Dominic	"Fire Burn"	Will Taylor, Jonas Gladnikoff, Natasha Turner	Advanced
17	Ira Losco	"That's Why I Love You"	Ira Losco, Howard Keith Debono, Matthias Strasser, Stefan Moessle	—N/a
18	Lawrence Gray	"You're Beautiful"	Paul Giordimaina, Fleur Balzan	Advanced
19	Maxine	"Young Love"	Elton Zarb, Matthew Mercieca	Advanced
20	Deborah C	"All Around the World"	Matthew Ker, Jonas Gladnikoff, Michael James Down, Primož Poglajen, Angie Laus	Advanced

==== Final ====
The final took place on 23 January 2016. The fourteen entries that qualified from the semi-final were performed again and the votes of a six-member jury panel (5/6) and the results of public televoting (1/6) determined the winner. The show was opened with a guest performance of "Not My Soul" performed by Malta's Junior Eurovision Song Contest 2015 winner Destiny Chukunyere, while the interval act featured further performances by Chukunyere as well as performances by Amber and the Southville Dancers dance troupe. After the votes from the jury panel and televote were combined, "Chameleon" performed by Ira Losco was the winner. "Chameleon" won the public televote with 40% of the votes.

Final – 23 January 2016
R/O	Artist	Song	Jury Votes					Televote	Total	Place
R/O	Artist	Song	N. Clark-Lowes	V. Ankova	S. Vulić	L. Fisher	Q. Scerri	Televote	Total	Place
1	Deborah C	"All Around the World"	3	1		4			8	11
2	Franklin	"Little Love"	7	8	10	8	5	6	44	3
3	Daniel Testa	"Under the Sun"		2					2	14
4	Brooke	"Golden"	12	12	7	7	10	10	58	2
5	Raquel	"Flashing Lights"		3	6		2	1	12	9
6	Christabelle	"Kingdom"	8	6	2	6	8	8	38	4
7	Corazon	"Falling Glass"	2		4		4	5	15	8
8	Dominic	"Fire Burn"			3	2			5	13
9	Jessika	"The Flame"	5	4	5		1	4	19	7
10	Jasmine	"Alive"	1	7	8	1	6	3	26	6
11	Lawrence Gray	"You're Beautiful"				5		2	7	12
12	Maxine	"Young Love"	6	5	1	10	7	7	36	5
13	Ira Losco	"Chameleon"	10	10	12	12	12	12	68	1
14	Kim	"Lighthouse"	4			3	3		10	10

=== Song selection ===
Following Losco's win at the Malta Eurovision Song Contest 2016, the singer stated that she was open to the idea of performing a song other than "Chameleon" at the Eurovision Song Contest should it improve Malta's chances of winning. The national final rules set by PBS allowed for the winning song to be partially modified or completely changed. On 19 February 2016, PBS announced that an international jury consisting of representatives from ten countries along with local experts from Malta would be presented with ten songs, including a revamped version of "Chameleon", and would determine which song Ira Losco would ultimately perform at the Eurovision Song Contest.

On 14 March 2016, PBS announced that Losco would perform the song "Walk on Water" at the Eurovision Song Contest 2016, which officially replaced "Chameleon" as the Maltese entry through the decision of thirteen international and local judges. "Walk on Water" was written by Lisa Desmond, Tim Larsson, Tobias Lundgren, Molly Pettersson Hammar and Ira Losco herself. The release of the song and official music video was announced on 17 March 2016 during the TVM news bulletin and made available online on the broadcaster's website tvm.com.mt and the official Eurovision Song Contest website eurovision.tv. Losco appeared as a guest during a special edition of the TVM programme Xarabank on 18 March to discuss and present the song. The music video for the song was filmed earlier in March in Gozo and at the Malta National Aquarium.

=== Promotion ===
Ira Losco made several appearances across Europe to specifically promote "Walk on Water" as the Maltese Eurovision entry. On 2 April, Losco performed during the Eurovision PreParty Riga, which was organised by OGAE Latvia and held at the Spikeri Concert Hall in Riga, Latvia. On 3 April, she performed during the Eurovision Pre-Party, which was held at the Izvestia Hall in Moscow, Russia and hosted by Dmitry Guberniev. Losco also completed promotional activities in Armenia following her performances in Riga and Moscow. On 9 April, Ira Losco performed during the Eurovision in Concert event which was held at the Melkweg venue in Amsterdam, Netherlands and hosted by Cornald Maas and Hera Björk. On 16 April, Losco performed "Walk on Water" live during the ČT1 televised broadcast of the charity show Pomozte dětem, which was held at the La Fabrika theatre in Prague, Czech Republic. The following day, Losco performed during the London Eurovision Party, which was held at the Café de Paris venue in London, United Kingdom and hosted by Nicki French and Paddy O'Connell. In addition to her international appearances, Ira Losco also completed promotional activities in Malta where she appeared during the TVM talk show programme Xarabank on 22 April and performed during the Malta Eurovision Party at the Aria Complex in San Ġwann on 23 April.

== At Eurovision ==
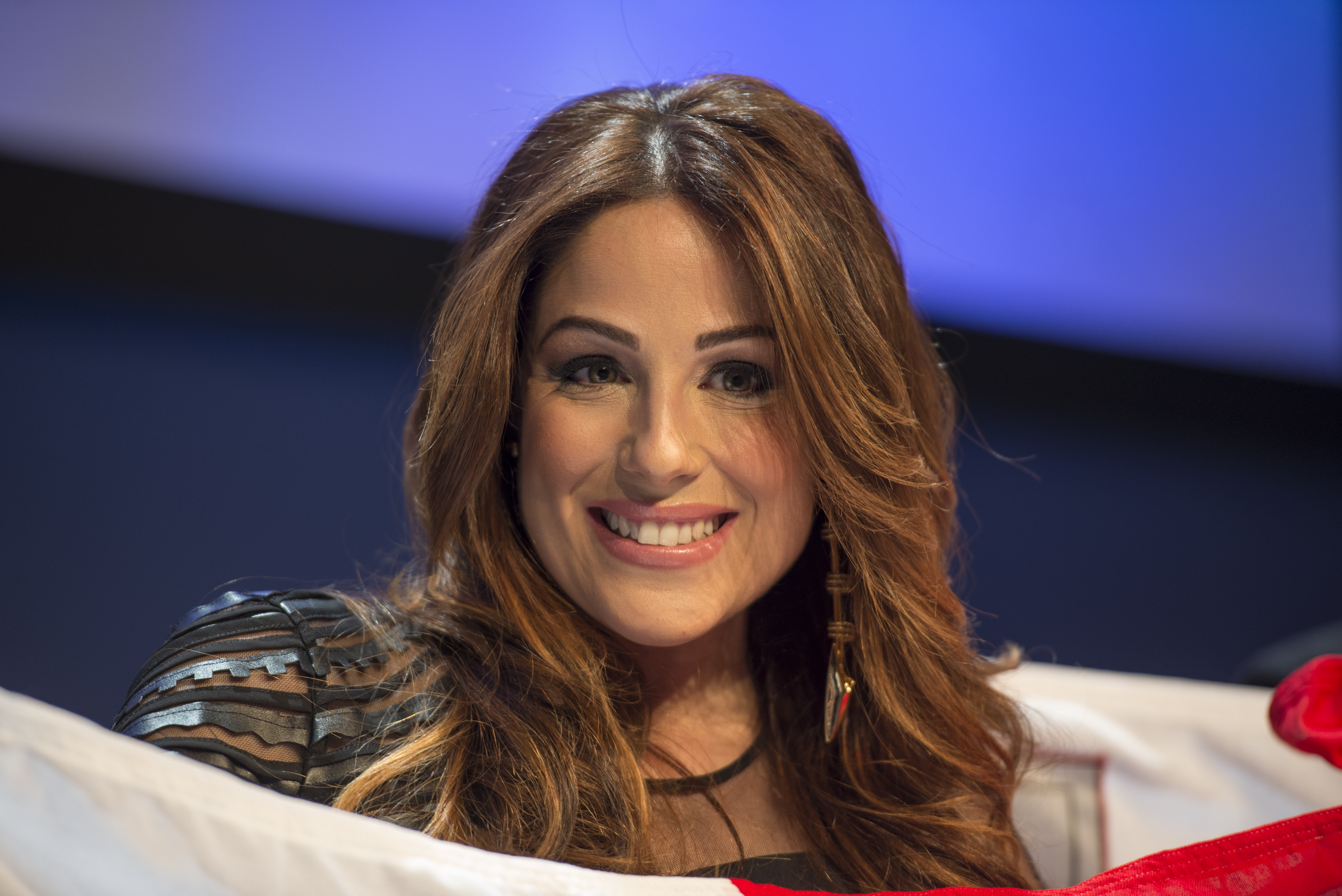
Ira Losco during a press meet and greet

The Eurovision Song Contest 2016 took place at the Globe Arena in Stockholm, Sweden and consisted of two semi-finals on 10 and 12 May, and the final of 14 May 2016. According to Eurovision rules, all nations with the exceptions of the host country and the "Big Five" (France, Germany, Italy, Spain and the United Kingdom) are required to qualify from one of two semi-finals in order to compete for the final; the top ten countries from each semi-final progress to the final. The European Broadcasting Union (EBU) split up the competing countries into six different pots based on voting patterns from previous contests, with countries with favourable voting histories put into the same pot. On 25 January 2016, an allocation draw was held which placed each country into one of the two semi-finals, as well as which half of the show they would perform in. Malta was placed into the first semi-final, to be held on 10 May 2016, and was scheduled to perform in the second half of the show.

Once all the competing songs for the 2016 contest had been released, the running order for the semi-finals was decided by the shows' producers rather than through another draw, so that similar songs were not placed next to each other. Malta was set to perform last in position 18, following the entry from Bosnia and Herzegovina.

The two semi-finals and the final were broadcast in Malta on TVM with commentary by Arthur Caruana. The Maltese spokesperson, who announced the top 12 points awarded by the Maltese jury during the final, was Ben Camille.

=== Semi-final ===
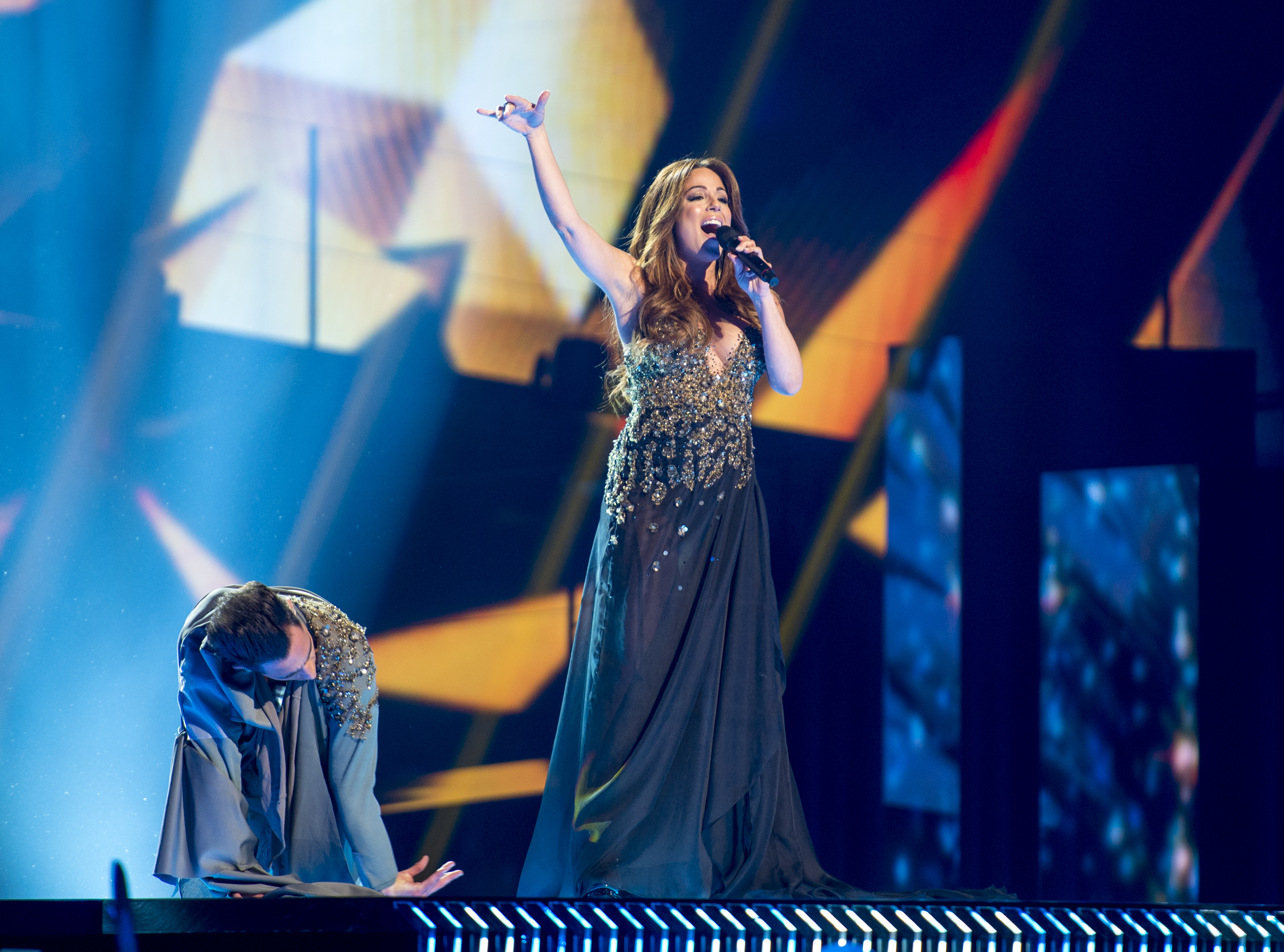
Ira Losco during a rehearsal before the first semi-final

Ira Losco took part in technical rehearsals on 3 and 6 May, followed by dress rehearsals on 9 and 10 May. This included the jury show on 9 May where the professional juries of each country watched and voted on the competing entries. On the day of the first semi-final, Malta was considered by bookmakers to be the second most likely country to advance into the final.

The Maltese performance featured Ira Losco wearing a black and gold rhinestone dress, designed by Australian designer Alex Zabotto-Bentley, and performing together with one dancer. The performance began with the LED screen floor projecting Ira Losco's face followed by Losco emerging on stage with the dancer performing choreographed movements. The performance was originally to have featured full 360 degree projection mapping on Losco's dress accomplished by real-time tracking technology; however, during the rehearsals, the Maltese delegation opted not to use the technology in the broadcast performance. The creative director for the Maltese performance was Stephane Boko. Ira Losco was joined by four off-stage backing vocalists: Pamela Bezzina, Anna Azzopardi, Lars Säfsund and Molly Pettersson Hammar. The dancer featured during the performance was Skorpion, who also appeared in the music video for "Walk on Water".

At the end of the show, Malta was announced as having finished in the top 10 and consequently qualifying for the grand final. It was later revealed that Malta placed third in the semi-final, receiving a total of 209 points: 54 points from the televoting and 155 points from the juries.

=== Final ===
Shortly after the first semi-final, a winners' press conference was held for the ten qualifying countries. As part of this press conference, the qualifying artists took part in a draw to determine which half of the grand final they would subsequently participate in. This draw was done in the order the countries appeared in the semi-final running order. Malta was drawn to compete in the second half. Following this draw, the shows' producers decided upon the running order of the final, as they had done for the semi-finals. Malta was subsequently placed to perform in position 22, following the entry from Ukraine and before the entry from Georgia. On the day of the grand final, bookmakers considered Malta the seventh most likely country to win the competition.

Ira Losco once again took part in dress rehearsals on 13 and 14 May before the final, including the jury final where the professional juries cast their final votes before the live show. Ira Losco performed a repeat of her semi-final performance during the final on 14 May. Malta placed twelfth in the final, scoring 153 points: 16 points from the televoting and 137 points from the juries.

=== Voting ===
Voting during the three shows was conducted under a new system that involved each country now awarding two sets of points from 1–8, 10 and 12: one from their professional jury and the other from televoting. Each nation's jury consisted of five music industry professionals who are citizens of the country they represent, with their names published before the contest to ensure transparency. This jury judged each entry based on: vocal capacity; the stage performance; the song's composition and originality; and the overall impression by the act. In addition, no member of a national jury was permitted to be related in any way to any of the competing acts in such a way that they cannot vote impartially and independently. The individual rankings of each jury member as well as the nation's televoting results were released shortly after the grand final.

Below is a breakdown of points awarded to Malta and awarded by Malta in the first semi-final and grand final of the contest, and the breakdown of the jury voting and televoting conducted during the two shows:

==== Points awarded to Malta ====
Points awarded to Malta (Semi-final 1)
Score	Televote	Jury
12 points		Armenia; Austria; Hungary
10 points	Armenia	France; Montenegro; Sweden
8 points	Azerbaijan	Cyprus; Czech Republic; Estonia; Finland; Netherlands; Russia
7 points		Croatia; Spain
6 points		Iceland; Moldova
5 points	Bosnia and Herzegovina; Cyprus; Moldova	San Marino
4 points	Hungary; Iceland; Montenegro	Azerbaijan; Greece
3 points		
2 points	Estonia; Russia	Bosnia and Herzegovina
1 point	Croatia; Czech Republic; Greece; Netherlands; Spain	

Points awarded to Malta (Final)
Score	Televote	Jury
12 points		Montenegro
10 points		Austria; Hungary; Serbia
8 points		Armenia; Russia
7 points		Bulgaria; Sweden
6 points	Australia	Azerbaijan; Cyprus; Czech Republic; Spain
5 points	Armenia; Azerbaijan	Belarus; Finland; Italy
4 points		France; Greece; Iceland; Latvia
3 points		Moldova; San Marino
2 points		Albania; Estonia
1 point		

==== Points awarded by Malta ====
Points awarded by Malta (Semi-final 1)
Score	Televote	Jury
12 points	Russia	Armenia
10 points	Azerbaijan	Russia
8 points	Hungary	Cyprus
7 points	Netherlands	Montenegro
6 points	Cyprus	San Marino
5 points	San Marino	Finland
4 points	Armenia	Moldova
3 points	Iceland	Czech Republic
2 points	Czech Republic	Estonia
1 point	Austria	Austria

Points awarded by Malta (Final)
Score	Televote	Jury
12 points	Australia	United Kingdom
10 points	Russia	Bulgaria
8 points	Bulgaria	Italy
7 points	Italy	Armenia
6 points	Azerbaijan	France
5 points	Hungary	Cyprus
4 points	Ukraine	Russia
3 points	Netherlands	Australia
2 points	France	Spain
1 point	United Kingdom	Israel

==== Detailed voting results ====
The following members comprised the Maltese jury:

- Matthew Merceica (Muxu; jury chairperson) – songwriter, vocal coach
- Maria Abdilla – vocal coach, music teacher
- Peter Borg – guitarist, songwriter, producer, musician
- Angie Laus – TV presenter, TV producer
- Ismael Portelli – director, creative director

Detailed voting results from Malta (Semi-final 1)
R/O	Country	Jury							Televote	
R/O	Country	Muxu	M. Abdilla	P. Borg	A. Laus	I. Portelli	Rank	Points	Rank	Points
01	Finland	11	8	9	4	7	6	5	13	
02	Greece	5	7	16	17	8	11		16	
03	Moldova	10	13	6	8	5	7	4	11	
04	Hungary	13	9	13	10	13	13		3	8
05	Croatia	15	17	14	14	9	17		12	
06	Netherlands	16	12	4	13	14	14		4	7
07	Armenia	2	1	1	2	1	1	12	7	4
08	San Marino	9	3	7	5	12	5	6	6	5
09	Russia	1	2	3	1	3	2	10	1	12
10	Czech Republic	12	6	11	6	11	8	3	9	2
11	Cyprus	8	14	2	3	2	3	8	5	6
12	Austria	7	11	10	7	17	10	1	10	1
13	Estonia	6	16	8	9	10	9	2	14	
14	Azerbaijan	14	15	12	16	6	15		2	10
15	Montenegro	4	5	5	12	4	4	7	17	
16	Iceland	3	10	15	15	15	12		8	3
17	Bosnia and Herzegovina	17	4	17	11	16	16		15	
18	Malta									

Detailed voting results from Malta (Final)
R/O	Country	Jury							Televote	
R/O	Country	Muxu	M. Abdilla	P. Borg	A. Laus	I. Portelli	Rank	Points	Rank	Points
01	Belgium	16	13	17	24	21	20		17	
02	Czech Republic	18	16	20	10	17	16		24	
03	Netherlands	13	11	15	25	20	17		8	3
04	Azerbaijan	20	9	21	19	8	11		5	6
05	Hungary	19	15	12	16	19	14		6	5
06	Italy	5	4	4	3	5	3	8	4	7
07	Israel	10	14	8	12	11	10	1	18	
08	Bulgaria	1	5	6	1	7	2	10	3	8
09	Sweden	11	12	22	22	18	18		11	
10	Germany	24	17	16	17	25	22		22	
11	France	4	7	1	8	4	5	6	9	2
12	Poland	25	21	24	18	24	25		13	
13	Australia	6	10	9	7	6	8	3	1	12
14	Cyprus	12	3	7	2	2	6	5	12	
15	Serbia	15	19	23	15	16	19		21	
16	Lithuania	14	22	14	20	9	13		16	
17	Croatia	21	18	25	21	15	23		25	
18	Russia	3	8	5	5	13	7	4	2	10
19	Spain	9	6	10	9	10	9	2	20	
20	Latvia	22	20	13	14	12	15		19	
21	Ukraine	23	25	18	23	14	24		7	4
22	Malta									
23	Georgia	17	24	19	11	22	21		23	
24	Austria	7	23	11	13	23	12		15	
25	United Kingdom	2	1	2	4	1	1	12	10	1
26	Armenia	8	2	3	6	3	4	7	14	

== After Eurovision ==
Losco and the Maltese delegation flew to Malta International Airport on 15 May and was greeted by fans upon her arrival at 5:00 pm CEST. She recognised the competitiveness of the contest in recent years, "It is always nice to be given such a warm welcome. During my journey at the Eurovision, the fans’ constant support instilled in me greater confidence and serenity." She received praise from her manager Howard Keith Debono, Maltese Prime Minister Joseph Muscat and the Leader of the Opposition Simon Busuttil. Two days later, Losco urged fellow Maltese musicians not to be pretentious over the contest, citing its relevance to competition within the music industry and its growing quality. However, she stated she would not commit to representing Malta at the Eurovision Song Contest for a third time, "The industry is cut-throat, as every artist knows. It’s great to go and busk and try your luck in another country but this is an experience that should also be one to aspire to, for artists in any country."
