= Malta in the Eurovision Song Contest 2015 =

- Eurovision Song Contest 2015
- Participating broadcaster: Public Broadcasting Services (PBS)
- Country: Malta
- Selection process: Malta Eurovision Song Contest 2015
- Selection date: 22 November 2014

Competing entry
- Song: "Warrior"
- Artist: Amber
- Songwriters: Elton Zarb; Matt "Muxu" Mercieca

Placement
- Semi-final result: Failed to qualify (11th)

Participation chronology

Malta was represented at the Eurovision Song Contest 2015 with the song "Warrior", written by Elton Zarb and Matt Muxu Mercieca, and performed by Amber. The Maltese participating broadcaster, Public Broadcasting Services (PBS), selected its entry for the contest through the national final Malta Eurovision Song Contest 2015. The competition consisted of a semi-final round and a final, held on 21 and 22 November 2014, respectively, where "Warrior" performed by Amber eventually emerged as the winning entry after scoring the most points from a five-member jury and a public televote.

Malta was drawn to compete in the second semi-final of the Eurovision Song Contest which took place on 21 May 2015. Performing during the show in position 5, "Warrior" was not announced among the top 10 entries of the first semi-final and therefore did not qualify to compete in the final on 23 May. It was later revealed that Malta placed eleventh out of the 17 participating countries in the semi-final with 43 points.

== Background ==
Prior to the 2015 contest, the Maltese Broadcasting Authority (MBA) until 1975, and the Public Broadcasting Services (PBS) since 1991, have participated in the Eurovision Song Contest representing Malta twenty-seven times since MBA's first entry in 1971. MBA briefly competed in the contest in the 1970s before withdrawing for sixteen years, while PBS competed in every contest since their return in 1991. Their best placing thus far was second, achieved on two occasions: 2002 with the song "7th Wonder" performed by Ira Losco, and in 2005 with the song "Angel" performed by Chiara. In 2025, "Coming Home" performed by Firelight qualified to the final and placed 23rd.

As part of its duties as participating broadcaster, PBS organises the selection of its entry in the Eurovision Song Contest and broadcasts the event in the country. The broadcaster confirmed its intentions to participate in the 2015 contest on 11 July 2014. The broadcaster selected its entry consistently through a national final procedure, a method that was continued for its 2015 participation. On 14 July 2014, PBS announced that the national final would take place one week after its hosting of the Junior Eurovision Song Contest 2014 on 15 November 2014, making use of the same venue and stage utilised for the junior contest.

== Before Eurovision ==
=== Malta Eurovision Song Contest 2015 ===
Malta Eurovision Song Contest 2015 was the national final format developed by PBS to select the Maltese entry for the Eurovision Song Contest 2015. The competition consisted of a semi-final and final held on 21 and 22 November 2014, respectively, at the Malta Shipbuilding in Marsa. Both shows were hosted by Daniel Chircop and Lyona Xuereb Gatt and broadcast on Television Malta (TVM) as well on the broadcaster's website tvm.com.mt, while the final was also broadcast on the official Eurovision Song Contest website eurovision.tv.

==== Format ====
The competition consisted of twenty songs competing in the semi-final on 21 November 2014 where the top fourteen entries qualified to compete in the final on 22 November 2014. Five judges evaluated the songs during the shows and each judge had an equal stake in the final result. The sixth set of votes were the results of the public televote, which had a weighting equal to the votes of a single judge. Ties in the final results were broken based on the entry which received the higher score from the judges. The five members of the jury that evaluated the entries during both the semi-final and final consisted of:

- Ola Melzig (Sweden) – Technical director of various Eurovision Song Contest and Junior Eurovision Song Contest events
- Francesco Biasia (Italy) – Fashion designer
- Gohar Gasparyan (Armenia) – Head of Delegation for Armenia at the Eurovision Song Contest
- Owen Galea (Malta) – News coordinator
- Adriana Zarb Adami (Malta) – Director of Bupa Malta

New rules and regulations for the competition allowed for the artist, author and composer of the winning entry to change parts of the winning song or the entire song for the Eurovision Song Contest.

==== Competing entries ====
Artists and composers were able to submit their entries between 28 and 29 August 2014 to the PBS Creativity Hub in Gwardamanġa. Artists were also required to submit a cover version of another song along with their entry application. Songwriters from any nationality were able to submit songs as long as the artist were Maltese or possessed Maltese citizenship. Artists were able to submit as many songs as they wished, however, they could only compete with a maximum of two in the semi-final and one in the final. 2014 national final winner Firelight were unable to compete due to a rule that prevented the previous winner from competing in the following competition. 134 entries were received by the broadcaster. On 26 September 2014, PBS announced a shortlist of 48 entries that had progressed through the selection process. The twenty songs selected to compete in the semi-final were announced on the TVM programme Xarabank on 3 October 2014. In order to present the competing songs to the public, the semi-finalists filmed promotional videos for their entries which were released on 20 October 2014. Among the selected competing artists were former Maltese Eurovision entrants Ludwig Galea (performing as part of the group Trilogy) who represented Malta in the 2004 contest, Glen Vella who represented Malta in the 2011 contest, and Gianluca Bezzina (performing as part of the group L-Aħwa) who represented Malta in the 2013 contest. Daniel Testa represented Malta in the Junior Eurovision Song Contest 2008.

==== Semi-final ====
The semi-final took place on 21 November 2014. Twenty songs competed for fourteen qualifying spots in the final. The running order for the semi-final was announced on 28 October 2014. The show was opened with a guest performance by the 2014 Maltese Junior Eurovision entrant Federica Falzon performing "Diamonds".

Semi-final – 21 November 2014
| R/O | Artist | Song | Songwriter(s) | Result |
|---|---|---|---|---|
| 1 | Lyndsay Pace | "Home" | Boris Cezek | —N/a |
| 2 | Iona Dalli | "Could Have Been Me" | Philip Vella | —N/a |
| 3 | Franklin | "Still Here" | Alexander Rybak | Advanced |
| 4 | Christabelle | "Rush" | Elton Zarb, Muxu | Advanced |
| 5 | Jessika | "Fandango" | Philip Vella, Gerard James Borg | Advanced |
| 6 | Chris Grech | "Closed Doors" | Chris Grech, Edward Mifsud, Peter Borg, David Cassar Torreggiani | Advanced |
| 7 | Karen DeBattista | "12, Baker Street" | Jan van Dijck, Emil Calleja Bayliss | Advanced |
| 8 | Daniel Testa | "Something in the Way" | Måns Ek, Charlie Mason | Advanced |
| 9 | Glen Vella | "Breakaway" | Kevin Borg, Simon Gribbe | Advanced |
| 10 | Raquel | "Stop Haunting Me" | Elton Zarb, Muxu | —N/a |
| 11 | Domenique | "Take Me As I Am" | Aidan O'Connor, Sara Biglert, Christian Schneider, Madeleine Jangklev | —N/a |
| 12 | Lawrence Gray | "The One That You Love" | Elton Zarb, Lawrence Gray | Advanced |
| 13 | Deborah C | "It's OK" | Elton Zarb, Muxu | Advanced |
| 14 | Danica Muscat | "Close Your Eyes" | Elton Zarb, Emil Calleja Bayliss | —N/a |
| 15 | Corazon | "Secretly" | Corazon Mizzi | —N/a |
| 16 | L-Aħwa | "Beautiful to Me" | Erik Anjou | Advanced |
| 17 | Amber | "Warrior" | Elton Zarb, Muxu | Advanced |
| 18 | Trilogy | "Chasing a Dream" | Joe Julian Farrugia, Paul Abela | Advanced |
| 19 | Dominic | "Once in a While" | Elton Zarb, Rita Pace | Advanced |
| 20 | Ekklesia Sisters | "Love and Let Go" | Philip Vella | Advanced |

==== Final ====
The final took place on 22 November 2014. The fourteen entries that qualified from the semi-final were performed again and the votes of a five-member jury panel (5/6) and the results of public televoting (1/6) determined the winner. The show was opened with a guest performance of "Rise Like a Phoenix" performed by Austria's Eurovision Song Contest 2014 winner Conchita Wurst, while the interval act featured further performances by Wurst performing "Heroes" as well as performances by local singer George Curmi and 2014 Maltese Eurovision entrants Firelight performing "Backdrop of Life", "Coming Home" and "Talk Dirty". After the votes from the jury panel and televote were combined, "Warrior" performed by Amber was the winner.

Final – 22 November 2014
| R/O | Artist | Song | Jury Votes | | | | | Televote | Total | Place |
| R/O | Artist | Song | O. Melzig | F. Biasia | G. Gasparyan | O. Galea | A. Zarb Adami | Televote | Total | Place |
|---|---|---|---|---|---|---|---|---|---|---|
| 1 | Glen Vella | "Breakaway" | 8 | 6 | 8 | 7 | 6 | 4 | 39 | 3 |
| 2 | Karen DeBattista | "12, Baker Street" | | | | | | | 0 | 14 |
| 3 | Dominic | "Once in a While" | 1 | 2 | 5 | 3 | | | 11 | 12 |
| 4 | Trilogy | "Chasing a Dream" | 4 | 3 | | 2 | | 3 | 12 | 10 |
| 5 | Chris Grech | "Closed Doors" | 7 | 7 | 10 | 5 | 4 | 2 | 35 | 4 |
| 6 | Ekklesia Sisters | "Love and Let Go" | 3 | 1 | 4 | | 5 | 10 | 23 | 7 |
| 7 | Jessika | "Fandango" | | | | 4 | 8 | 6 | 18 | 9 |
| 8 | Deborah C | "It's OK" | 2 | 4 | 6 | | | | 12 | 11 |
| 9 | Amber | "Warrior" | 12 | 12 | 12 | 12 | 12 | 12 | 72 | 1 |
| 10 | L-Aħwa | "Beautiful to Me" | | | 7 | | 3 | 1 | 11 | 13 |
| 11 | Franklin | "Still Here" | 6 | 5 | | 6 | 1 | 8 | 26 | 5 |
| 12 | Christabelle | "Rush" | 10 | 10 | 2 | 8 | 10 | 7 | 47 | 2 |
| 13 | Lawrence Gray | "The One That You Love" | | | 1 | 10 | 2 | 5 | 18 | 8 |
| 14 | Daniel Testa | "Something in the Way" | 5 | 8 | 3 | 1 | 7 | | 24 | 6 |

=== Preparation ===
Following Amber's win at the Malta Eurovision Song Contest 2015, PBS announced that "Warrior" would undergo remastering for the Eurovision Song Contest. The composers of the song Elton Zarb and Matt Muxu Mercieca worked with Gordon Bonello and Kevin Abela to produce the revamped version. A 57-piece orchestra was also used for the recording. The release of the song's new version and official music video was announced on 9 March 2015 at the PBS Creativity Hub in Gwardamanġa and made available online on the broadcaster's website tvm.com.mt and the official Eurovision Song Contest website eurovision.tv. The music video for the song was filmed earlier at a 400 year old abandoned house in Rabat, Malta.

== At Eurovision ==
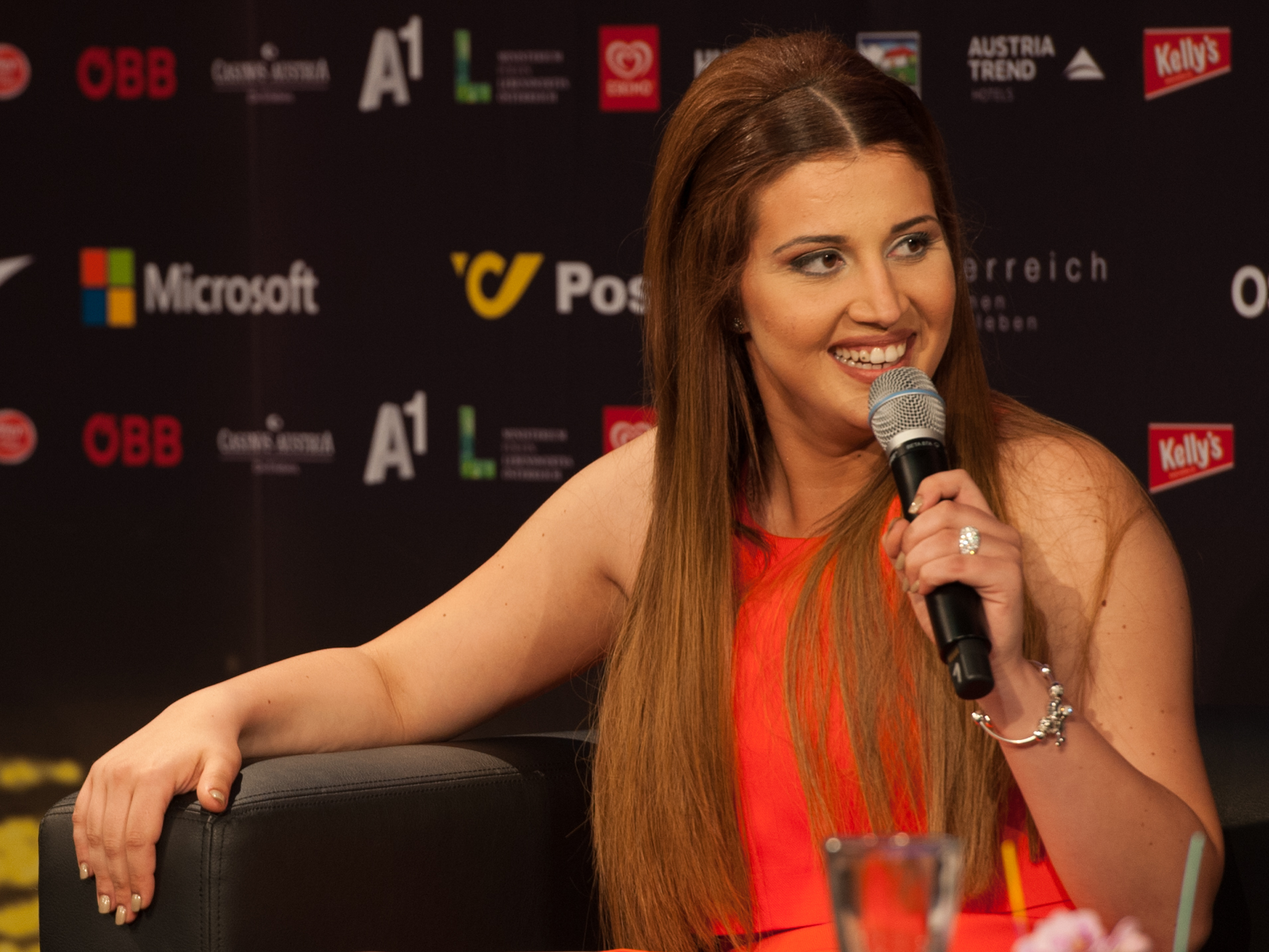
Amber during a press meet and greet

The Eurovision Song Contest 2015 took place at the Hall D of the Wiener Stadthalle in Vienna, Austria and consisted of two semi-finals on 19 and 21 May, and the final of 23 May 2015. According to Eurovision rules, all nations with the exceptions of the host country and the "Big Five" (France, Germany, Italy, Spain and the United Kingdom) are required to qualify from one of two semi-finals in order to compete for the final; the top ten countries from each semi-final progress to the final. In the 2015 contest, Australia also competed directly in the final as an invited guest nation. The European Broadcasting Union (EBU) split up the competing countries into five different pots based on voting patterns from previous contests, with countries with favourable voting histories put into the same pot. On 26 January 2015, an allocation draw was held which placed each country into one of the two semi-finals, as well as which half of the show they would perform in. Malta was placed into the second semi-final, to be held on 21 May 2015, and was scheduled to perform in the first half of the show.

Once all the competing songs for the 2015 contest had been released, the running order for the semi-finals was decided by the shows' producers rather than through another draw, so that similar songs were not placed next to each other. Malta was set to perform in position 5, following the entry from Montenegro and before the entry from Norway.

The two semi-finals and the final were broadcast in Malta on TVM with commentary by Corazon Mizzi. The Maltese spokesperson, who announced the Maltese votes during the final, was previous 2004 contest entrant Julie Zahra.

=== Semi-final ===
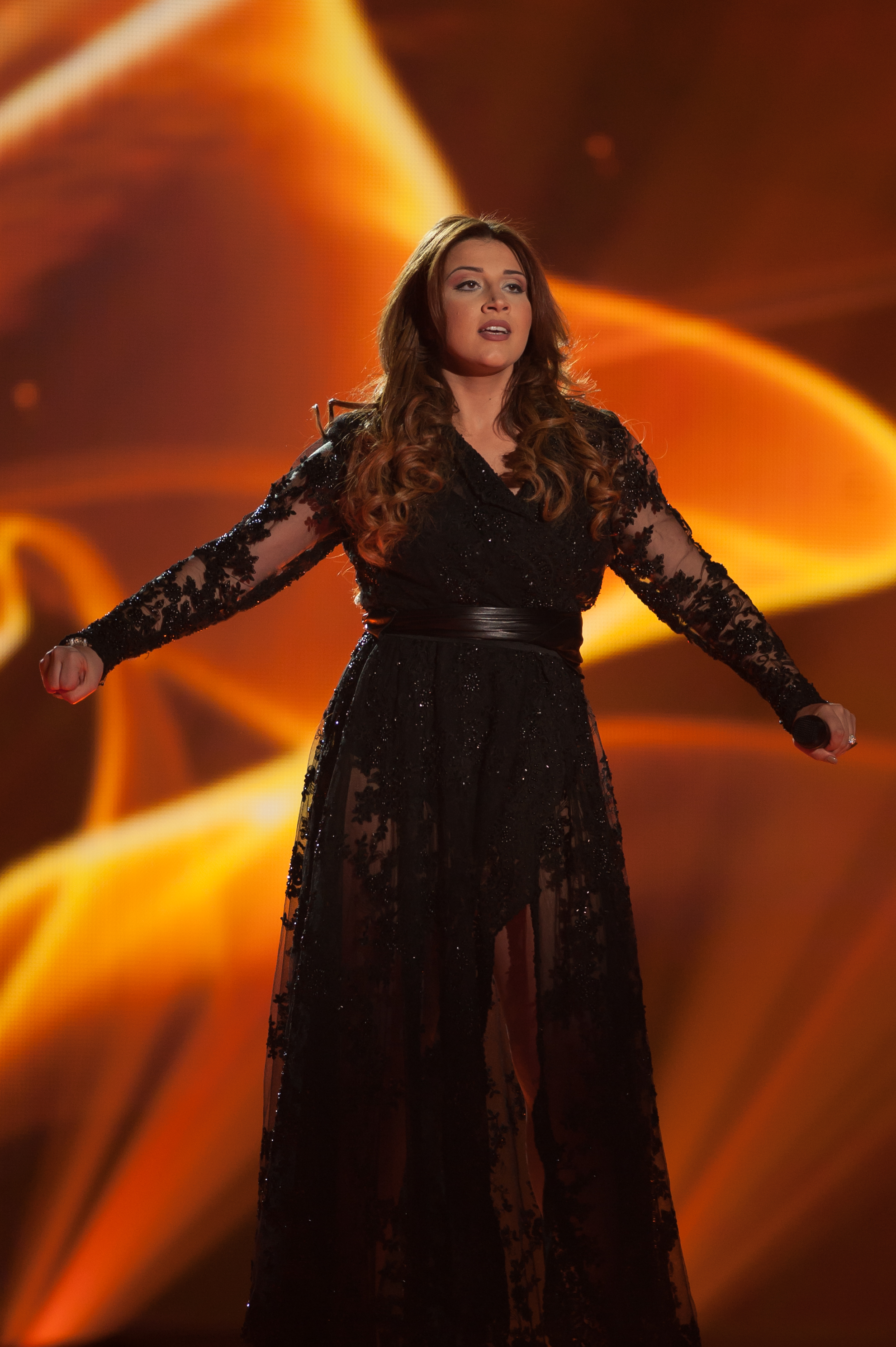
Amber during a rehearsal before the second semi-final

Amber took part in technical rehearsals on 13 and 16 May, followed by dress rehearsals on 20 and 21 May. This included the jury show on 20 May where the professional juries of each country watched and voted on the competing entries.

The Maltese performance featured Amber on stage alone in a long black dress with lace sleeves and a black ribbon around her waist. As the song progressed, the LED screens transitioned between blue flame-like effects exploding outwards from a sphere and orange and red flames. The performance also utilised pyrotechnics in the form of shooting flames.

At the end of the show, Malta was not announced among the top 10 entries in the first semi-final and therefore failed to qualify to compete in the final. It was later revealed that Malta placed eleventh in the semi-final, receiving a total of 43 points.

=== Voting ===
Voting during the three shows consisted of 50 percent public televoting and 50 percent from a jury deliberation. The jury consisted of five music industry professionals who were citizens of the country they represent, with their names published before the contest to ensure transparency. This jury was asked to judge each contestant based on: vocal capacity; the stage performance; the song's composition and originality; and the overall impression by the act. In addition, no member of a national jury could be related in any way to any of the competing acts in such a way that they cannot vote impartially and independently. The individual rankings of each jury member were released shortly after the grand final.

Following the release of the full split voting by the EBU after the conclusion of the competition, it was revealed that Malta had placed twelfth with the public televote and fifth with the jury vote in the second semi-final. In the public vote, Malta scored 32 points, while with the jury vote, Malta scored 84 points.

Below is a breakdown of points awarded to Malta and awarded by Malta in the second semi-final and grand final of the contest, and the breakdown of the jury voting and televoting conducted during the two shows:

==== Points awarded to Malta ====
Points awarded to Malta (Semi-final 2)
| Score | Country |
|---|---|
| 12 points | |
| 10 points | Israel; Montenegro |
| 8 points | |
| 7 points | San Marino |
| 6 points | |
| 5 points | United Kingdom |
| 4 points | Czech Republic |
| 3 points | Australia; Ireland |
| 2 points | |
| 1 point | Italy |

==== Points awarded by Malta ====
Points awarded by Malta (Semi-final 2)
| Score | Country |
|---|---|
| 12 points | Sweden |
| 10 points | Israel |
| 8 points | Azerbaijan |
| 7 points | Latvia |
| 6 points | Poland |
| 5 points | Norway |
| 4 points | Lithuania |
| 3 points | Slovenia |
| 2 points | Cyprus |
| 1 point | Czech Republic |

Points awarded by Malta (Final)
| Score | Country |
|---|---|
| 12 points | Italy |
| 10 points | Sweden |
| 8 points | Azerbaijan |
| 7 points | Russia |
| 6 points | Australia |
| 5 points | Israel |
| 4 points | Latvia |
| 3 points | Estonia |
| 2 points | Norway |
| 1 point | United Kingdom |

==== Detailed voting results ====
The following members comprised the Maltese jury:

- Howard Keith Debono (jury chairperson) – producer, artist manager, event organizer
- Dorothy Bezzina – teacher, singer
- Dominic Cini – music producer
- Joseph Chetcuti – lawyer, violinist, presenter
- Pierre Cordina – radio presenter, club DJ

Detailed voting results from Malta (Semi-final 2)
| R/O | Country | H.K. Debono | D. Bezzina | D. Cini | J. Chetcuti | P. Cordina | Jury Rank | Televote Rank | Combined Rank | Points |
|---|---|---|---|---|---|---|---|---|---|---|
| 01 | Lithuania | 6 | 11 | 4 | 9 | 8 | 7 | 10 | 7 | 4 |
| 02 | Ireland | 9 | 13 | 14 | 11 | 16 | 12 | 12 | 13 | |
| 03 | San Marino | 16 | 12 | 9 | 8 | 7 | 10 | 13 | 11 | |
| 04 | Montenegro | 12 | 9 | 15 | 14 | 15 | 14 | 14 | 15 | |
| 05 | Malta | | | | | | | | | |
| 06 | Norway | 5 | 1 | 5 | 5 | 10 | 5 | 6 | 6 | 5 |
| 07 | Portugal | 13 | 8 | 6 | 10 | 9 | 9 | 16 | 14 | |
| 08 | Czech Republic | 11 | 7 | 13 | 13 | 14 | 11 | 9 | 10 | 1 |
| 09 | Israel | 4 | 5 | 3 | 3 | 5 | 4 | 2 | 2 | 10 |
| 10 | Latvia | 3 | 3 | 2 | 4 | 6 | 3 | 7 | 4 | 7 |
| 11 | Azerbaijan | 2 | 2 | 7 | 2 | 1 | 2 | 4 | 3 | 8 |
| 12 | Iceland | 14 | 15 | 16 | 16 | 11 | 16 | 8 | 12 | |
| 13 | Sweden | 1 | 4 | 1 | 1 | 2 | 1 | 1 | 1 | 12 |
| 14 | Switzerland | 10 | 16 | 12 | 15 | 13 | 15 | 15 | 16 | |
| 15 | Cyprus | 15 | 14 | 11 | 12 | 12 | 13 | 5 | 9 | 2 |
| 16 | Slovenia | 7 | 6 | 8 | 7 | 3 | 6 | 11 | 8 | 3 |
| 17 | Poland | 8 | 10 | 10 | 6 | 4 | 8 | 3 | 5 | 6 |

Detailed voting results from Malta (Final)
| R/O | Country | H.K. Debono | D. Bezzina | D. Cini | J. Chetcuti | P. Cordina | Jury Rank | Televote Rank | Combined Rank | Points |
|---|---|---|---|---|---|---|---|---|---|---|
| 01 | Slovenia | 20 | 9 | 10 | 16 | 5 | 11 | 20 | 15 | |
| 02 | France | 13 | 8 | 23 | 19 | 13 | 15 | 26 | 21 | |
| 03 | Israel | 9 | 10 | 12 | 5 | 9 | 7 | 6 | 6 | 5 |
| 04 | Estonia | 7 | 7 | 24 | 8 | 6 | 10 | 8 | 8 | 3 |
| 05 | United Kingdom | 11 | 14 | 27 | 10 | 14 | 14 | 9 | 10 | 1 |
| 06 | Armenia | 23 | 13 | 6 | 17 | 21 | 16 | 27 | 23 | |
| 07 | Lithuania | 19 | 20 | 25 | 12 | 8 | 18 | 16 | 16 | |
| 08 | Serbia | 17 | 23 | 16 | 9 | 10 | 13 | 11 | 12 | |
| 09 | Norway | 10 | 4 | 4 | 7 | 23 | 8 | 13 | 9 | 2 |
| 10 | Sweden | 2 | 5 | 5 | 2 | 3 | 2 | 2 | 2 | 10 |
| 11 | Cyprus | 12 | 19 | 11 | 14 | 15 | 12 | 19 | 14 | |
| 12 | Australia | 4 | 3 | 2 | 13 | 7 | 4 | 5 | 5 | 6 |
| 13 | Belgium | 15 | 15 | 20 | 15 | 20 | 19 | 7 | 13 | |
| 14 | Austria | 22 | 22 | 14 | 23 | 24 | 22 | 23 | 26 | |
| 15 | Greece | 27 | 25 | 15 | 18 | 18 | 21 | 21 | 22 | |
| 16 | Montenegro | 14 | 12 | 8 | 27 | 19 | 17 | 24 | 20 | |
| 17 | Germany | 21 | 18 | 17 | 24 | 27 | 23 | 22 | 25 | |
| 18 | Poland | 26 | 24 | 22 | 20 | 16 | 24 | 15 | 19 | |
| 19 | Latvia | 6 | 6 | 7 | 3 | 12 | 6 | 10 | 7 | 4 |
| 20 | Romania | 24 | 21 | 19 | 25 | 25 | 25 | 12 | 17 | |
| 21 | Spain | 5 | 11 | 13 | 11 | 11 | 9 | 14 | 11 | |
| 22 | Hungary | 25 | 27 | 21 | 21 | 26 | 27 | 25 | 27 | |
| 23 | Georgia | 18 | 17 | 18 | 22 | 17 | 20 | 17 | 18 | |
| 24 | Azerbaijan | 8 | 2 | 9 | 6 | 1 | 3 | 4 | 3 | 8 |
| 25 | Russia | 3 | 16 | 3 | 4 | 4 | 5 | 3 | 4 | 7 |
| 26 | Albania | 16 | 26 | 26 | 26 | 22 | 26 | 18 | 24 | |
| 27 | Italy | 1 | 1 | 1 | 1 | 2 | 1 | 1 | 1 | 12 |
