= Malta in the Eurovision Song Contest 2014 =

- Eurovision Song Contest 2014
- Participating broadcaster: Public Broadcasting Services (PBS)
- Country: Malta
- Selection process: Malta Eurovision Song Contest 2014
- Selection date: 8 February 2014

Competing entry
- Song: "Coming Home"
- Artist: Firelight
- Songwriters: Richard Micallef

Placement
- Semi-final result: Qualified (9th, 64 points)
- Final result: 23rd, 32 points

Participation chronology

Malta was represented at the Eurovision Song Contest 2014 with the song "Coming Home", written by Richard Micallef, and performed by Firelight. The Maltese participating broadcaster, Public Broadcasting Services (PBS), selected its entry in the contest through the national final Malta Eurovision Song Contest 2014. The competition consisted of a semi-final round and a final, held on 7 and 8 February 2014, respectively, where "Coming Home" performed by Firelight eventually emerged as the winning entry after scoring the most points from a five-member jury and a public televote.

Malta was drawn to compete in the second semi-final of the Eurovision Song Contest which took place on 8 May 2014. Performing as the opening entry during the show in position 1, "Coming Home" was announced among the top 10 entries of the second semi-final and therefore qualified to compete in the final on 10 May. It was later revealed that Malta placed ninth out of the 15 participating countries in the semi-final with 64 points. In the final, Malta performed in position 22 and placed twenty-third out of the 26 participating countries, scoring 32 points.

== Background ==
Prior to the 2014 contest, the Maltese Broadcasting Authority (MBA) until 1975, and the Public Broadcasting Services (PBS) since 1991, have participated in the Eurovision Song Contest representing Malta twenty-six times since MBA's first entry in 1971. MBA briefly competed in the contest in the 1970s before withdrawing for sixteen years, while PBS competed in every contest since their return in 1991. Their best placing in the contest so far is second, which it achieved on two occasions; 2002 with the song "7th Wonder" performed by Ira Losco, and in 2005 with the song "Angel" performed by Chiara. In 2013, "Tomorrow" performed by Gianluca qualified to the final and placed 8th.

As part of its duties as participating broadcaster, PBS organises the selection of its entry in the Eurovision Song Contest and broadcasts the event in the country. The broadcaster confirmed its intentions to participate in the 2014 contest on 19 July 2013. The broadcaster selected its entry consistently through a national final procedure, a method that was continued for its 2014 participation.

== Before Eurovision ==
=== Malta Eurovision Song Contest 2014 ===
Malta Eurovision Song Contest 2014 was the national final format developed by PBS to select the Maltese entry for the Eurovision Song Contest 2014. The competition consisted of a semi-final and final held on 7 and 8 February 2014, respectively, at the Malta Fairs and Conventions Centre in Ta' Qali. Both shows were hosted by television presenter Moira Delia and past Maltese Eurovision entrants Ira Losco and Gianluca Bezzina and broadcast on Television Malta (TVM) as well on the broadcaster's website tvm.com.mt, while the final was also broadcast on the official Eurovision Song Contest website eurovision.tv.

==== Format ====
The competition consisted of twenty songs competing in the semi-final on 7 February 2014 where the top fourteen entries qualified to compete in the final on 8 February 2014. Five judges evaluated the songs during the shows and each judge had an equal stake in the final result. The sixth set of votes were the results of the public televote, which had a weighting equal to the votes of a single judge. Ties in the final results were broken based on the entry which received the higher score from the judges.

==== Competing entries ====
Artists and composers were able to submit their entries between 24 September 2013 and 31 October 2013 with an entry fee of €150 per submission. Songwriters from any nationality were able to submit songs as long as the artist were Maltese or possessed Maltese citizenship. Artists were able to submit as many songs as they wished, however, they could only compete with a maximum of two in the semi-final and one in the final. 2013 national final winner Gianluca Bezzina was unable to compete due to a rule that prevented the previous winner from competing in the following competition. 210 entries were received by the broadcaster. On 19 November 2013, PBS announced a shortlist of 70 entries that had progressed through the selection process. The twenty songs selected to compete in the semi-final were announced on the TVM programme Xarabank on 29 November 2013. In order to present the competing songs to the public, the semi-finalists filmed promotional videos for their entries which were released in December 2013. Among the selected competing artists were former Maltese Eurovision entrants Miriam Christine who represented Malta in the 1996 contest and Fabrizio Faniello who represented Malta in the 2001 and 2006 contests. Sophie DeBattista represented Malta in the Junior Eurovision Song Contest 2006 and Daniel Testa represented Malta in the Junior Eurovision Song Contest 2008.

==== Semi-final ====
The semi-final took place on 7 February 2014. Twenty songs competed for fourteen qualifying spots in the final. The running order for the semi-final was announced on 3 December 2013. The interval act featured guest performances by Denmark's Eurovision Song Contest 2013 winner Emmelie de Forest performing "Only Teardrops", 2014 Ukrainian Eurovision entrant Maria Yaremchuk performing "Tick-Tock" and the local bands the Crowns and Red Electrick. The five members of the jury that evaluated the entries during the semi-final consisted of:

- Reuben Zammit (Malta) – Programmes Manager at PBS
- Ekaterina Orlova (Russia) – Head of Delegation for Russia at the Eurovision Song Contest
- Alessandro Capicchioni (San Marino) – Head of Delegation for San Marino at the Eurovision Song Contest
- Victoria Romanova (Ukraine) – Head of Delegation for Ukraine at the Eurovision Song Contest
- Arthur Caruana (Malta) – Presenter at Magic Malta

Semi-final – 7 February 2014
R/O	Artist	Song	Songwriter(s)	Result
1	Amber	"Because I Have You"	Paul Giordimaina, Fleur Balzan	Advanced
2	Chris Grech	"Oblivion"	Philip Vella, Gerard James Borg	Advanced
3	Romina Mamo	"Addictive"	Ylva Persson, Linda Persson	—N/a
4	Jessika	"Hypnotica"	Philip Vella, Gerard James Borg	Advanced
5	Andreana	"Now and Forever"	Vinny Vella, Karl Spiteri	—N/a
6	Daniel Testa	"One Last Ride"	Stephen Rudden, Lawrence Peter Bridge	Advanced
7	Raquel	"Invisible"	Gerard James Borg, Philip Vella	—N/a
8	Fabrizio Faniello	"Just No Place Like Home"	Johan Bejerholm	—N/a
9	Wayne William	"Some Kind of Wonderful"	Wayne Micallef	Advanced
10	Ryan Paul Abela	"City Lady"	Paul Abela, Ryan Paul Abela, Joe Julian Farrugia	Advanced
11	Christabelle	"Lovetricity"	Magnus Kaxe, Gerard James Borg	Advanced
12	Pamela	"Take Me"	Boris Cezek	Advanced
13	Sophie	"Let the Sunshine In"	Sophie DeBattista, Adam Pakard, Alex Dew	Advanced
14	Franklin	"Love Will Take Me Home"	Glen Vella, Beatrice Eriksson, Marcus Frenell, Michael James Down	Advanced
15	Miriam Christine	"Safe"	Mark Scicluna, Emil Calleja Bayliss	—N/a
16	Deborah C	"Until We Meet Again"	Elton Zarb, Matt Mercieca	Advanced
17	Firelight	"Coming Home"	Richard Micallef	Advanced
18	De Bee	"Pin the Middle"	Peter Paul Galea, Debbie Stivala	Advanced
19	Davinia	"Brand New Day"	Elton Zarb, Matt Mercieca	Advanced
20	Corazon	"Ten"	Paul Giordimaina, Fleur Balzan	—N/a

==== Final ====
The final took place on 8 February 2014. The fourteen entries that qualified from the semi-final were performed again and the votes of a five-member jury panel (5/6) and the results of public televoting (1/6) determined the winner. The interval act featured guest performances by Malta's Junior Eurovision Song Contest 2013 winner Gaia Cauchi, Emmelie de Forest performing "Rainmaker", 2014 Swiss Eurovision entrant Sebalter performing "Hunter of Stars" and the local bands Winter Moods and Ġorġ u Pawlu. After the votes from the jury panel and televote were combined, "Coming Home" performed by Firelight were the winners. The five members of the jury that evaluated the entries during the final consisted of:

- Peter Cossai (Malta) – Head of Sports Programmes at PBS
- Ekaterina Orlova (Russia) – Head of Delegation for Russia at the Eurovision Song Contest
- Nicola Caligiore (Italy) – Head of Delegation for Italy at the Eurovision Song Contest
- Olga Salamakha (Belarus) – Head of Delegation for Belarus at the Eurovision Song Contest
- Reuben Zammitt (Malta) – Programmes Manager at PBS

Final – 8 February 2014
R/O	Artist	Song	Jury Votes					Televote	Total	Place
R/O	Artist	Song	P. Cossai	E. Orlova	N. Caligiore	O. Salamakha	R. Zammitt	Televote	Total	Place
1	Christabelle	"Lovetricity"	5	2	2		5	4	18	8
2	Wayne William	"Some Kind of Wonderful"		1		7	1		9	12
3	Davinia	"Brand New Day"			4			3	7	13
4	Ryan Paul Abela	"City Lady"	4	3	7		2		16	10
5	Franklin	"Love Will Take Me Home"		4	5	8	3	5	25	7
6	Daniel Testa	"One Last Ride"	3	10	8	10		10	41	3
7	Sophie	"Let the Sunshine In"	1			3	7		11	11
8	Chris Grech	"Oblivion"				6		1	7	13
9	Deborah C	"Until We Meet Again"	8	12	3	5			28	5
10	Jessika	"Hypnotica"	2				4	12	18	8
11	Pamela	"Take Me"	6	5	1	1	8	6	27	6
12	Firelight	"Coming Home"	12	8	12	12	12	7	63	1
13	Amber	"Because I Have You"	10	6	6	2	6	2	32	4
14	De Bee	"Pin the Middle"	7	7	10	4	10	8	46	2

=== Preparation ===
Following Firelight's win at the Malta Eurovision Song Contest 2014, the band worked with Italian musicians Arturo Pellegrini and Maurizio Campo to create a new arrangement for "Coming Home". The release of the new version was presented on 4 March during a press conference at the PBS Creativity Hub in Gwardamanġa.

=== Promotion ===
Firelight made several appearances across Europe to specifically promote "Coming Home" as the Maltese Eurovision entry. On 5 April, Firelight performed during the Eurovision in Concert event which was held at the Melkweg venue in Amsterdam, Netherlands and hosted by Cornald Maas and Sandra Reemer. On 13 April, they performed during the London Eurovision Party, which was held at the Café de Paris venue in London, United Kingdom and hosted by Nicki French and Paddy O'Connell. On 20 April, Firelight performed during the Russian Pre-Party event, which was organised by ESCKAZ and held at the Karlson restaurant in Moscow, Russia.

== At Eurovision ==
Firelight presenting themselves and "Coming Home" at the Eurovision Song Contest 2014

According to Eurovision rules, all nations with the exceptions of the host country and the "Big Five" (France, Germany, Italy, Spain and the United Kingdom) are required to qualify from one of two semi-finals in order to compete for the final; the top ten countries from each semi-final progress to the final. The European Broadcasting Union (EBU) split up the competing countries into six different pots based on voting patterns from previous contests, with countries with favourable voting histories put into the same pot. On 20 January 2014, an allocation draw was held which placed each country into one of the two semi-finals, as well as which half of the show they would perform in. Malta was placed into the second semi-final, to be held on 8 May 2014, and was scheduled to perform in the first half of the show.

Once all the competing songs for the 2014 contest had been released, the running order for the semi-finals was decided by the shows' producers rather than through another draw, so that similar songs were not placed next to each other. Malta was set to open the show and perform in position 1, before the entry from Israel.

The two semi-finals and the final were broadcast in Malta on TVM with commentary by Carlo Borg Bonaci. The Maltese spokesperson, who announced the Maltese votes during the final, was Valentina Rossi.

=== Semi-final ===
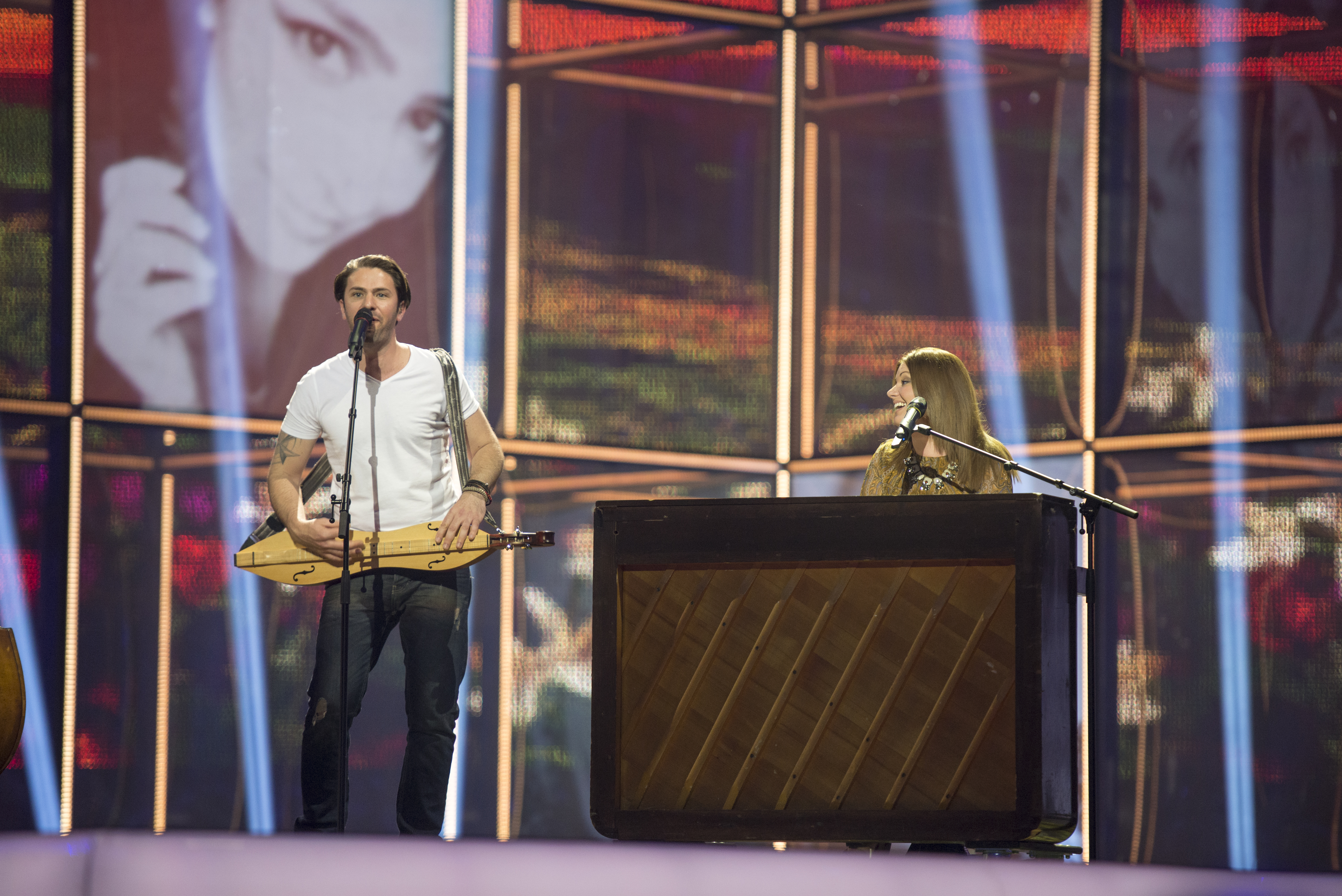
Firelight during a rehearsal before the second semi-final

Firelight took part in technical rehearsals on 29 April and 3 May, followed by dress rehearsals on 7 and 8 May. This included the jury show on 7 May where the professional juries of each country watched and voted on the competing entries.

The Maltese performance featured the members of Firelight performing with several instruments on stage. The background LED screens projected a field with red and blue skies, while the cube screens displayed black and white photos which were 208 selfies that the Maltese broadcaster received after a public request was made asking fans to send in their photos in late March 2014.

At the end of the show, Malta was announced as having finished in the top 10 and consequently qualifying for the grand final. It was later revealed that Malta placed ninth in the semi-final, receiving a total of 63 points.

=== Final ===
Shortly after the second semi-final, a winners' press conference was held for the ten qualifying countries. As part of this press conference, the qualifying artists took part in a draw to determine which half of the grand final they would subsequently participate in. This draw was done in the order the countries were announced during the semi-final. Malta was drawn to compete in the second half. Following this draw, the shows' producers decided upon the running order of the final, as they had done for the semi-finals. Malta was subsequently placed to perform in position 22, following the entry from Hungary and before the entry from Denmark.

Firelight once again took part in dress rehearsals on 9 and 10 May before the final, including the jury final where the professional juries cast their final votes before the live show. The band performed a repeat of their semi-final performance during the final on 10 May. Malta placed twenty-third in the final, scoring 32 points.

=== Voting ===
Voting during the three shows consisted of 50 percent public televoting and 50 percent from a jury deliberation. The jury consisted of five music industry professionals who were citizens of the country they represent, with their names published before the contest to ensure transparency. This jury was asked to judge each contestant based on: vocal capacity; the stage performance; the song's composition and originality; and the overall impression by the act. In addition, no member of a national jury could be related in any way to any of the competing acts in such a way that they cannot vote impartially and independently. The individual rankings of each jury member were released shortly after the grand final.

Following the release of the full split voting by the EBU after the conclusion of the competition, it was revealed that Malta had placed twenty-fourth with the public televote and sixth with the jury vote in the final. In the public vote, Malta scored 17 points, while with the jury vote, Malta scored 119 points. In the second semi-final, Malta placed twelfth with the public televote with 36 points and third with the jury vote, scoring 113 points.

Below is a breakdown of points awarded to Malta and awarded by Malta in the second semi-final and grand final of the contest, and the breakdown of the jury voting and televoting conducted during the two shows:

==== Points awarded to Malta ====
Points awarded to Malta (Semi-final 2)
Score	Country
12 points	Macedonia
10 points	
8 points	Georgia
7 points	United Kingdom
6 points	
5 points	Finland; Italy; Switzerland
4 points	Belarus; Poland
3 points	Germany; Ireland; Romania
2 points	Norway
1 point	Austria; Lithuania

Points awarded to Malta (Final)
Score	Country
12 points	
10 points	United Kingdom
8 points	
7 points	
6 points	
5 points	Azerbaijan; Netherlands
4 points	San Marino
3 points	Finland; Ireland
2 points	
1 point	Albania; Italy

==== Points awarded by Malta ====
Points awarded by Malta (Semi-final 2)
Score	Country
12 points	Romania
10 points	Austria
8 points	Greece
7 points	Norway
6 points	Belarus
5 points	Switzerland
4 points	Ireland
3 points	Macedonia
2 points	Georgia
1 point	Poland

Points awarded by Malta (Final)
Score	Country
12 points	Italy
10 points	Austria
8 points	Romania
7 points	Sweden
6 points	Armenia
5 points	Russia
4 points	United Kingdom
3 points	Switzerland
2 points	Norway
1 point	Greece

==== Detailed voting results ====
The following members comprised the Maltese jury:

- Paul Abela (jury chairperson) – musician, composer, maestro
- Manolito Galea – sound engineer
- Elton Zarb – music producer
- Corazon Mizzi – television host, semi-professional singer/songwriter
- Pamela Bezzina – vocal coach, singer, vocal arranger

Detailed voting results from Malta (Semi-final 2)
R/O	Country	P. Abela	M. Galea	E. Zarb	C. Mizzi	P. Bezzina	Jury Rank	Televote Rank	Combined Rank	Points
01	Malta									
02	Israel	9	7	13	13	12	14	11	14	
03	Norway	5	5	11	3	7	5	6	4	7
04	Georgia	4	4	7	11	4	3	14	9	2
05	Poland	13	3	10	14	10	11	8	10	1
06	Austria	12	6	1	4	11	8	1	2	10
07	Lithuania	7	9	8	1	8	7	12	12	
08	Finland	11	8	12	12	9	13	7	13	
09	Ireland	10	13	5	9	14	12	3	7	4
10	Belarus	3	14	2	5	3	2	9	5	6
11	Macedonia	6	12	3	7	2	4	13	8	3
12	Switzerland	14	10	9	6	1	10	4	6	5
13	Greece	2	11	4	10	5	6	5	3	8
14	Slovenia	8	2	14	2	13	9	10	11	
15	Romania	1	1	6	8	6	1	2	1	12

Detailed voting results from Malta (Final)
R/O	Country	P. Abela	M. Galea	E. Zarb	C. Mizzi	P. Bezzina	Jury Rank	Televote Rank	Combined Rank	Points
01	Ukraine	10	13	14	24	18	19	18	21	
02	Belarus	4	11	18	3	2	4	16	11	
03	Azerbaijan	6	21	2	7	5	5	24	16	
04	Iceland	22	20	22	21	25	25	22	24	
05	Norway	9	8	17	15	10	11	8	9	2
06	Romania	2	3	1	5	9	3	7	3	8
07	Armenia	1	2	3	6	3	1	15	5	6
08	Montenegro	7	6	4	16	8	6	25	17	
09	Poland	15	9	6	25	21	18	9	14	
10	Greece	3	10	5	20	11	8	11	10	1
11	Austria	14	4	13	11	16	9	1	2	10
12	Germany	20	24	19	17	17	21	20	23	
13	Sweden	21	5	12	14	7	10	3	4	7
14	France	23	19	24	18	22	24	23	25	
15	Russia	8	7	21	1	6	7	10	6	5
16	Italy	5	1	7	2	4	2	2	1	12
17	Slovenia	19	12	16	4	12	12	21	18	
18	Finland	25	18	23	19	19	23	14	20	
19	Spain	13	14	8	23	13	14	12	12	
20	Switzerland	24	22	11	12	1	13	6	8	3
21	Hungary	16	15	20	22	15	20	19	22	
22	Malta									
23	Denmark	17	16	15	10	14	16	13	15	
24	Netherlands	18	23	25	13	24	22	5	13	
25	San Marino	11	25	9	8	20	17	17	19	
26	United Kingdom	12	17	10	9	23	15	4	7	4
