= Needing You =

Needing You may refer to:

- "Needing You" (song), by Kevin Borg, 2013
- Needing You..., a 2000 film

== See also ==
- "Needin' U", a 1998 song by David Morales Presents The Face
