= Firelight (band) =

Maltese band

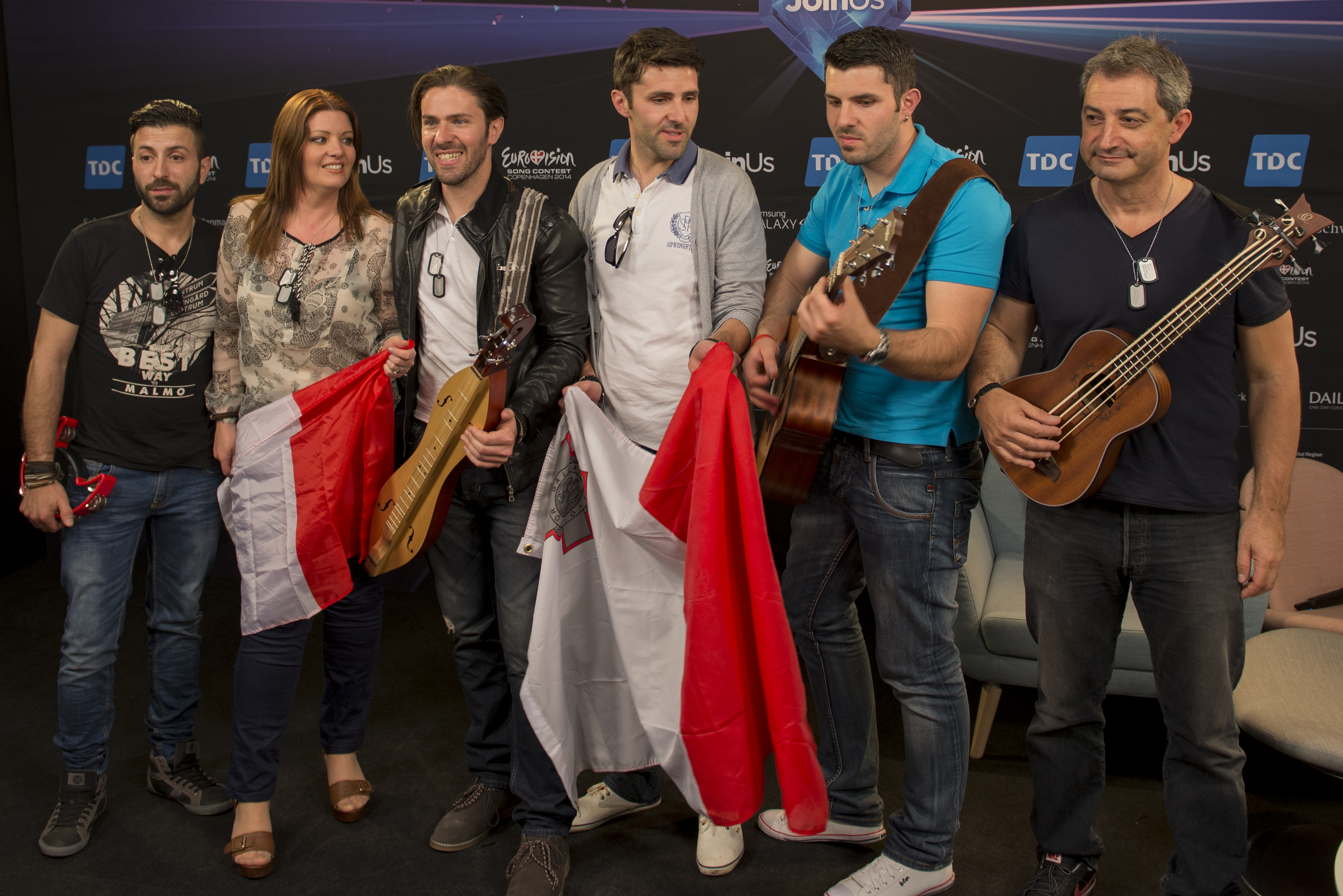
- Firelight (2014)

Background information
- Origin: Malta
- Genres: Country folk, folk pop, indie folk
- Years active: 2013–present
- Members: Michelle Mifsud; Richard Edward Micallef; Tony Polidano; Daniel Micallef; Wayne Williams; Leslie Decesare

Firelight is a pop/folk-band founded in 2013 by vocalist Richard Edwards Micallef in Malta. Michelle Mifsud (vocals and piano), Wayne Williams (vocals, keys and guitar) and Daniel (guitars) are all Richard's siblings. The band is completed by Tony Polidano (bass) and Leslie Decesare (drums).

Firelight's style is a mix of pop, rock, country and folk. Richard plays the Appalachian dulcimer, an American traditional instrument related to the European zither.

Firelight represented Malta in the Eurovision Song Contest 2014 with their song "Coming Home", placing 23rd out of 26 with 32 points, receiving 12 points from the jury selections from Armenia and the UK.

Firelight released their first album called "Backdrop Of Life" in October 2014.

== Band members ==
- Michelle Mifsud – vocals, piano, percussion
- Richard Edward Micallef – vocals, acoustic guitar, Appalachian dulcimer, percussion
- Tony Polidano – vocals, upright bass, electric bass, acoustic bass, percussion
- Daniel Micallef – acoustic guitar, electric guitar
- Leslie Decesare – drums, percussion, harmonica
- Wayne Williams -vocals, acoustic guitar, keyboards

== Discography ==
=== Album ===
Year	Title
2014	Backdrop of Life

=== Singles ===
Title	Year	Peak chart positions					Album
Title	Year	AUT	GER	IRE	SWI	UK	Album
"Coming Home"	2014	50	83	93	58	82	Backdrop of Life

Awards and achievements
Preceded by Gianluca Bezzina with "Tomorrow"	Malta in the Eurovision Song Contest; 2014	Succeeded by Amber Bondin with "Warrior"
