= Gianluca Bezzina =

Maltese doctor and singer

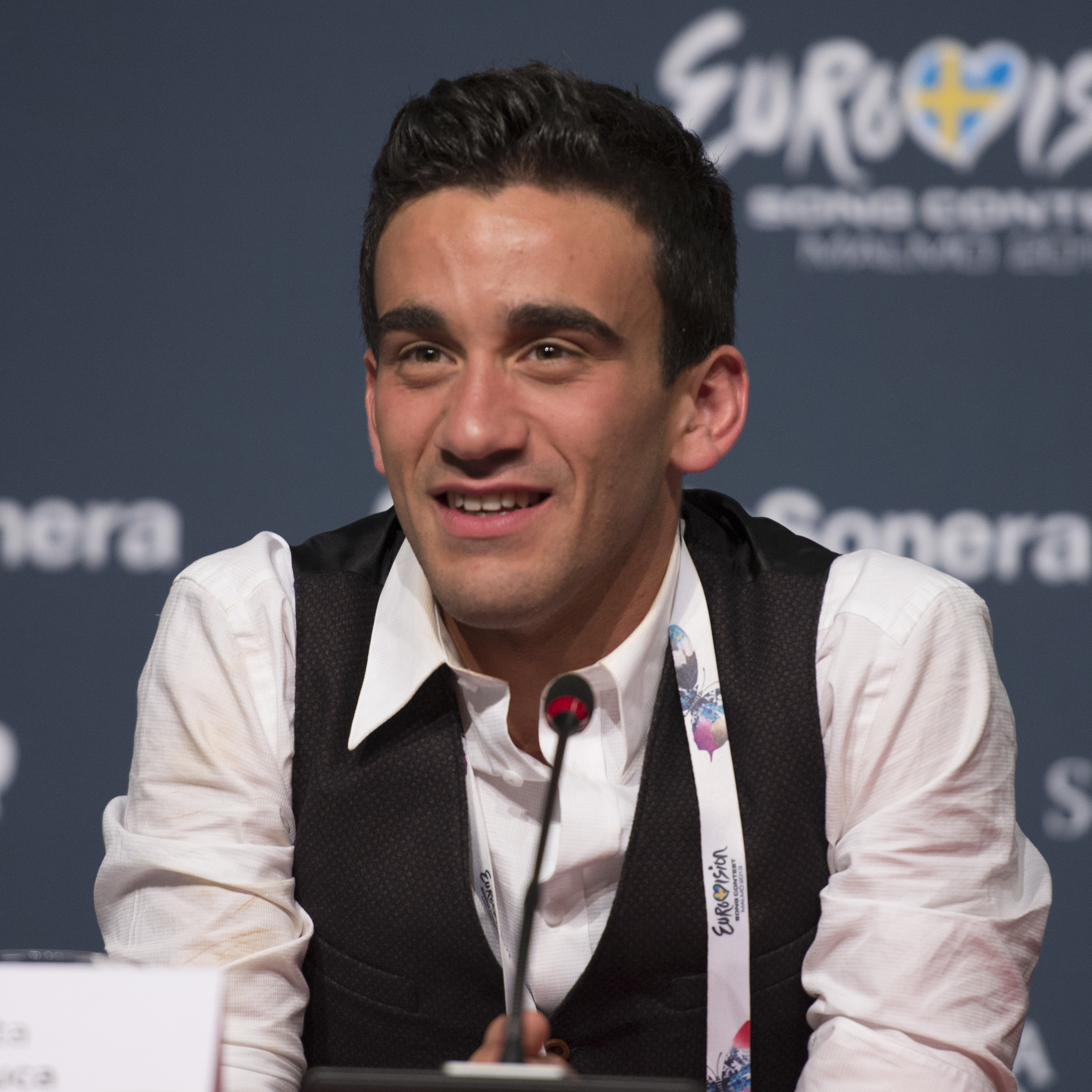
- Gianluca Bezzina during a Eurovision 2013 press conference

Background information
- Born: 9 November 1989 (age 36); Qrendi, Malta
- Genres: Pop
- Occupations: Doctor, Singer

Gianluca Bezzina (born 9 November 1989) is a Maltese singer and medical doctor who represented Malta in the Eurovision Song Contest 2013 in Malmö, Sweden.

== Biography ==
Gianluca Bezzina was born in 1989 in Qrendi, Malta. He is the third of seven siblings. Members of his family sang the song "Tomorrow" on TVM (Malta). Gianluca's maternal grandfather, the late Gaetano Buttigieg of Marsa, Malta, better known as Gaetano Kanta, was also a very well-known figure in Malta. He was one of the pioneers in the use of the Maltese Language in pop music. In the 1950s, '60s and '70s Gaetano published Maltese lyrics adapted to international pop songs.

== Career ==
Bezzina started his musical career by studying the piano accordion at the age of seven, while simultaneously developing his singing skills with the Malta Children's Choir. His grandfather Gaetano, always encouraged Gianluca in his singing career,. Gianluca was also deeply influenced by Roman Catholic youth organizations which he still frequents on a regular basis, especially the Youth Fellowship, where religious musical activities and celebrations are held.

Bezzina was the front man of Funk Initiative, and has released three singles, including "The Liberators," and "Paris," which have been played on local radio stations and have even topped the local charts. On 19 June 2014 Funk Initiative was declared the winners of the Isle Of MTV Battle Of The Bands Competition and they opened the Isle of MTV concert held on the Granaries in Floriana on 25 July 2014. They will be performing their track. Gianluca is one of the three doctors forming part of this band. The other members are two engineers and an accounts teacher.

Bezzina who has been practising as a medical doctor since July 2012, together with Ira Losco and Moira Delia presented the semi-finals and finals of the Malta Eurovision Song Contest 2014 held on 7 and 8 February 2014. Bezzina and Losco sang two duets, "Feeling Good" and "Let Her Go".

On 19 March 2014, Gianluca took part in a performance at the Teatru Salesjan in Sliema. The show, produced and directed by his sister Dorothy Bezzina, was a tribute to Gianluca's grandfather, Gaetano, on the tenth anniversary of his demise. Gianluca, together with other members of his family, sang 24 songs, all in Maltese, many of them cover versions of popular international songs. The lyrics of all these songs were written by their grandfather, "Nannu" Gaetano.

On 3 October 2014, Gianluca, together with four of his sisters, qualified for the semi-final of the Maltese selection for the Eurovision Song Contest 2015, with the song "Beautiful To Me". They are singing as a group called "L-Aħwa", the Maltese word for siblings.

=== Eurovision Song Contest 2013 ===
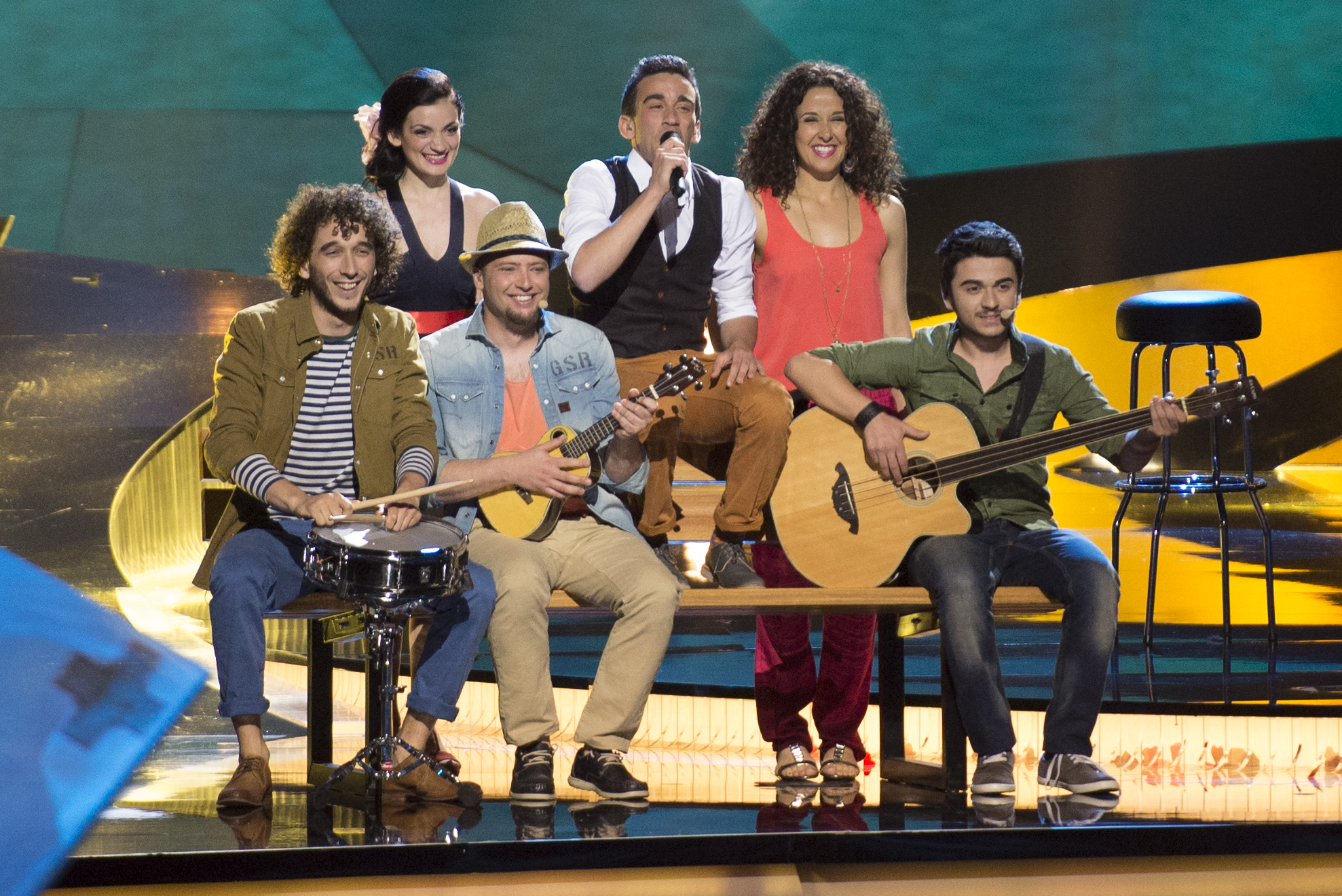
Bezzina at the Eurovision Song Contest 2013

Bezzina won the Maltese national final to represent Malta in the Eurovision Song Contest 2013 in Malmö, Sweden with the song "Tomorrow." In reality, he participated in the Malta national song contest just for fun. It was his first participation. After he won the contest, Gianluca stated that he was very surprised that he won the contest.

Bezzina took 4th place in the Eurovision Song Contest Semi-Final on Thursday 16 May 2013 with 118 points. This qualified Bezzina for the final on Saturday 18 May 2013. In the final, Bezzina finished in 8th place with a total score of 120. The Maltese entry received points from 22 of the 38 voting nations.

When Gianluca arrived back in Malta on Sunday 19 May 2013 he was given a hero's welcome by fans, family, and friends.

Bezzina's song "Tomorrow" became the first Maltese Eurovision Song Contest to enter the UK Singles Chart, peaking at number 37, for a week but dropping to number 66 the week after.

=== National selection for Eurovision Song Contest 2015 and debut album ===
On 21 and 22 November 2014, Gianluca participated in the Maltese national semi-final, and even in the final of the Malta Eurovision Song Contest 2015 vying for another opportunity to represent Malta in the Eurovision Song Contest 2015. He was part of the group L-Aħwa with the song "Beautiful to Me". The group was made up of Dorothy Bezzina, Samaria, Gianluca, Paul, Vincienne and Francesca, all of them are members of the Bezzina family. In 2016 he released the album Waiting for Tomorrow.

=== 2022-23: The Voice Kids Malta and X Factor Malta ===
In 2022 he was a coach in the Maltese version of The Voice Kids and in 2023 he became a judge in X Factor Malta.

=== Political views ===
On 24 May 2015, Gianluca addressed the general council of the Nationalist Party (Malta). He stated his personal religious and conservative views by saying: “It really bothers me that the values and morals that have been safeguarded for several years are now changing drastically. The mentality has become more liberal, and nowadays, whenever an individual feels something is right, he seeks to justify it by changing a law ... Morals which have been enshrined in everyday life are being redefined and reinvented, and countries across the world are legislating in favour of these ‘rights’ to get more votes.”. Despite this, Gianluca has never closely affiliated himself to any political party and has never shown any interest in pursuing a career in politics.

== Discography ==
=== Studio albums & Singles ===
As a Solo Artist

- 2013: Waiting for Tomorrow - Count me In - Tomorrow - I'll Be There - Perfect - Light Me Up - High and Away - Picture - Happy Song - Walk on Blind - Perfectly In Tune
- 2023: Sabiha

==== With Funk Initiative ====
- 2015: Cartographers - Sunlight - Two Policecars and an Ambulance - I pray my Soul is Saved but I Guess its Damned - The Furthest from Home That I've Ever been - Exclamation Marks - Idiots - Cartographers - Landmines - Old Bones - Vietnam - One more song Before I Go - Creatures of the Night

==== With Pilgrim & King ====
- 2015: Glorious EP - Glorious - King of Heaven - My Redemption - Fill My Life
- 2016: This is grace - Let Hope Arise - Abundant Love - Rain - Holy Spirit Song - Hands of Grace - Psalm 145 - Coming Home - King of Heaven - I praise you - I am with you

==== With The Tailors ====
- 2018: Something Happened
- 2019: Spacesuits
- 2021: Sailors
- 2021: Same Shoes, Different Day

==== With Mogadishu ====
- 2021: Just Enough
- 2022: Bonfire

With The Travellers

- 2023: Tridx Tkun Tiegħi Dan Il-Milied, The Travellers featuring Ira Losco, Gianluca, and Michela

=== Singles ===
| Year | Title | Peak chart positions | | | | Album |
| Year | Title | GER | IRE | NL | UK | Album |
|---|---|---|---|---|---|---|
| 2013 | "Tomorrow" | 70 | 69 | 32 | 66 | Waiting For Tomorrow |
| 2023 | "Sabiħa" | — | — | — | — | —N/a |

| Preceded by Kurt Calleja with "This is the Night" | Malta in the Eurovision Song Contest; 2013 | Succeeded by Firelight with "Coming Home" |
