= Malta in the Eurovision Song Contest 2013 =

- Eurovision Song Contest 2013
- Participating broadcaster: Public Broadcasting Services (PBS)
- Country: Malta
- Selection process: Malta Eurovision Song Contest 2013
- Selection date: 2 February 2013

Competing entry
- Song: "Tomorrow"
- Artist: Gianluca
- Songwriters: Boris Cezek; Dean Muscat

Placement
- Semi-final result: Qualified (4th, 118 points)
- Final result: 8th, 120 points

Participation chronology

Malta was represented at the Eurovision Song Contest 2013 with the song "Tomorrow" written by Boris Cezek and Dean Muscat. The song was performed by Gianluca. The Maltese entry for the 2013 contest in Malmö, Sweden was selected through the national final Malta Eurovision Song Contest 2013, organised by the Maltese broadcaster Public Broadcasting Services (PBS). The competition consisted of a semi-final round and a final, held on 1 and 2 February 2013, respectively, where "Tomorrow" performed by Gianluca eventually emerged as the winning entry after scoring the most points from a seven-member jury and a public televote.

Malta was drawn to compete in the second semi-final of the Eurovision Song Contest which took place on 16 May 2013. Performing during the show in position 4, "Tomorrow" was announced among the top 10 entries of the second semi-final and therefore qualified to compete in the final on 18 May. It was later revealed that Malta placed fourth out of the 17 participating countries in the semi-final with 118 points. In the final, Malta performed in position 9 and placed eighth out of the 26 participating countries, scoring 120 points.

== Background ==
Prior to the 2013 contest, Malta had participated in the Eurovision Song Contest twenty-five times since its first entry in 1971. Malta briefly competed in the Eurovision Song Contest in the 1970s before withdrawing for sixteen years. The country had, to this point, competed in every contest since returning in 1991. Malta's best placing in the contest thus far was second, which it achieved on two occasions: in 2002 with the song "7th Wonder" performed by Ira Losco and in the 2005 contest with the song "Angel" performed by Chiara. In the 2012 edition, Malta qualified to the final and placed 21st with the song "This Is the Night" performed by Kurt Calleja.

For the 2013 contest, the Maltese national broadcaster, Public Broadcasting Services (PBS), broadcast the event within Malta and organised the selection process for the nation's entry. PBS confirmed their intentions to participate at it on 14 September 2012. Malta selected their entry consistently through a national final procedure, a method that was continued for their 2013 participation.

== Before Eurovision ==
=== Malta Eurovision Song Contest 2013 ===
Malta Eurovision Song Contest 2013 was the national final format developed by PBS to select the Maltese entry for the Eurovision Song Contest 2013. The competition consisted of a semi-final and final held on 1 and 2 February 2013, respectively, at the Malta Fairs & Conventions Centre in Ta' Qali. Both shows were hosted by Elaine Saliba and Gordon Bonello with backstage commentary and interviews by Rodney Gauci and broadcast on Television Malta (TVM) as well on the broadcaster's website tvm.com.mt, while the final was also broadcast on the official Eurovision Song Contest website eurovision.tv.

==== Format ====
The competition consisted of twenty-four songs competing in the semi-final on 1 February 2013 where the top sixteen entries qualified to compete in the final on 2 February 2013. Seven judges evaluated the songs during the shows and each judge had an equal stake in the final result. The eighth set of votes were the results of the public televote, which had a weighting equal to the votes of a single judge. Ties in the final results were broken based on the entry which received the higher score from the judges.

==== Competing entries ====
Artists and composers were able to submit their entries between 14 September 2012 and 31 October 2012. Songwriters from any nationality were able to submit songs as long as the artist were Maltese or possessed Maltese citizenship. Artists were able to submit as many songs as they wished, however, they could only compete with a maximum of two in the semi-final and one in the final. 2012 national final winner Kurt Calleja was unable to compete due to a rule that prevented the previous winner from competing in the following competition. 181 entries were received by the broadcaster. On 14 November 2012, PBS announced a shortlist of 69 entries that had progressed through the selection process. The twenty-four songs selected to compete in the semi-final were announced on the TVM programme Xarabank on 30 November 2012. Among the selected competing artists was former Maltese Junior Eurovision entrant Marilena who represented Malta in the 2004 contest as part of the group Young Talent Team. On 21 December 2012, "Dress Rehearsal", written by Philip Vella and Gerard James Borg and to have been performed by Saska Hunt, was withdrawn from the competition and replaced with the song "Overrated" performed by Marilena.

==== Semi-final ====
The semi-final took place on 1 February 2013. Twenty-four songs competed for sixteen qualifying spots in the final. The running order for the semi-final was announced on 23 January 2013. The show was opened with a guest performance by the 2012 Maltese Eurovision entrant Kurt Calleja performing "This Is the Night", while the interval act featured performances by 1994 Maltese Eurovision entrants Chris and Moira as well as the singer Alexandra Alden. The seven members of the jury that evaluated the entries during the semi-final consisted of:

- Maria Muscat (Malta) – Journalist and television producer
- Alessandro Ragni (Italy) – External consultant for the Italian National Television (RAI)
- Gohar Gasparyan (Armenia) – Head of Delegation for Armenia at the Eurovision Song Contest
- Kleart Duraj (Albania) – Head of Delegation for Albania at the Eurovision Song Contest
- Aleksandar Kostadinov (Croatia) – Head of Delegation for Croatia at the Eurovision Song Contest
- Walid Arfush (Ukraine) – Director of the Ukrainian National Television (NTU)
- Carlo Borg Bonaci (Malta) – Radio and television presenter

Semi-final – 1 February 2013
R/O	Artist	Song	Songwriter(s)	Result
1	Richard Edwards	"Fall Like Rome"	Philip Vella, Magnus Kaxe, Gerard James Borg	Advanced
2	Ylenia	"Tides of Illusion"	Jason Cassar, Mario Farrugia	—N/a
3	Janice Debattista	"Perfect Day"	Boris Cezek, Dean Muscat	Advanced
4	Chris Grech	"Never Walk Away"	Matthew James Borg, David Cassar Torregiani, Chris Grech, Peter Borg	Advanced
5	Marilena	"Overrated"	Philip Vella, Gerard James Borg	—N/a
6	Petra	"No One Home"	Wayne Micallef, Richard Micallef	—N/a
7	Dorothy Bezzina	"Starting from the End"	Magnus Kaxe, Gerard James Borg	Advanced
8	Domenique	"Too Little Too Late"	Marc Paelinck, Matthias Strasser	Advanced
9	Jessika	"Ultraviolet"	Philip Vella, Thomas G:son, Gerard James Borg	Advanced
10	Franklin Calleja	"Let Your Heart Talk"	Ray Aguis, Alfred C. Sant	—N/a
11	Claudia Faniello	"When It's Time"	Errol Sammut, Claudia Faniello	Advanced
12	Corazon	"My Stranger Love"	Paul Giordimaina, Fleur Balzan	Advanced
13	Kevin Borg	"Needing You"	Kevin Borg, Simon Gribbe, Dan Attlerud, Thomas Thörnholm, Michael Clauss	Advanced
14	Scar	"Superstar"	Konrad Pulѐ	Advanced
15	Melanie Zammit	"Loverdose"	Maria Lundin, Niclas Lundin, Gerard James Borg	—N/a
16	Danica Muscat	"Fantasy"	Paul Abela, Joe Julian Farrugia	—N/a
17	Petra and Richard	"Wonderful Today"	Wayne Micallef, Richard Micallef	Advanced
18	Deborah C	"Love-O-Holic"	Johan Bejerholm, Gerard James Borg	Advanced
19	Gianni	"Us Against the World"	Boris Cezek, Dean Muscat	Advanced
20	Raquela	"Keep Believing"	Raquela Dalli Gonzi	—N/a
21	Gianluca Bezzina	"Tomorrow"	Boris Cezek, Dean Muscat	Advanced
22	Amber	"In Control"	Paul Giordimaina, Fleur Balzan	Advanced
23	Klinsmann	"The Remedy"	Philip Vella, Magnus Kaxe, Gerard James Borg	—N/a
24	Davinia	"Betrayed"	Elton Zarb, Muxu	Advanced

==== Final ====
The final took place on 2 February 2013. The sixteen entries that qualified from the semi-final were performed again and the votes of a seven-member jury panel (7/8) and the results of public televoting (1/8) determined the winner. The show was opened with a guest performance by the DREAMS musical drama group, while the interval act featured guest performances by 2013 Swiss Eurovision entrants Heilsarmee performing "You and Me", Kurt Calleja and the local band Ġorġ u Pawlu. After the votes from the jury panel and televote were combined, "Tomorrow" performed by Gianluca Bezzina was the winner. The seven members of the jury that evaluated the entries during the final consisted of:

- Aleksandar Kostadinov (Croatia) – Head of Delegation for Croatia at the Eurovision Song Contest
- Noel Magri (Malta) – Co-organiser of the Malta Music Awards
- Alessandro Ragni (Italy) – Manager and music consultant
- Anna Dalli (Malta) – Administration Coordinator at PBS
- Walid Arfush (Ukraine) – Director of the Ukrainian National Television (NTU)
- Olga Salamakha (Belarus) – Head of Delegation for Belarus at the Eurovision Song Contest
- Carlo Borg Bonaci (Malta) – Radio presenter

Final – 2 February 2013
R/O	Artist	Song	Jury Votes							Televote	Total	Place
R/O	Artist	Song	A. Kostadinov	N. Magri	A. Ragni	A. Dalli	W. Arfush	O. Salamakha	C. Borg Bonaci	Televote	Total	Place
1	Scar	"Superstar"		2	8	1				1	12	11
2	Dorothy Bezzina	"Starting from the End"					2			3	5	15
3	Corazon	"My Stranger Love"	5		2			1	3		11	12
4	Jessika	"Ultraviolet"				6	5		1	7	19	8
5	Gianni	"Us Against the World"		3		4			2		9	14
6	Davinia Pace	"Betrayed"	8	5	5	8	10	4	8		48	3
7	Kevin Borg	"Needing You"	10	10	10	12	8	8	10	12	80	2
8	Richard Edwards	"Fall Like Rome"			3	3	4				10	13
9	Janice Debattista	"Perfect Day"	4			2		3	4		13	10
10	Deborah C	"Love-O-Holic"	3	1	1	5		2		5	17	9
11	Claudia Faniello	"When It's Time"		4				5	5	6	20	7
12	Gianluca Bezzina	"Tomorrow"	12	12	12	10	12	12	12	10	92	1
13	Chris Grech	"Never Walk Away"	6	7	7		7	7		8	42	5
14	Petra and Richard	"Wonderful Today"	7	6	6		3	6	7	2	37	6
15	Amber	"In Control"	2	8	4	7	6	10	6	4	47	4
16	Domenique	"Too Little Too Late"	1				1				2	16

=== Promotion ===
Gianluca made several appearances across Europe to specifically promote "Tomorrow" as the Maltese Eurovision entry. On 2 March, Gianluca performed "Tomorrow" during the Armenian Eurovision national final. On 1 April, he performed during the 2013 Malta Music Awards and appeared during the TVM talk show programme Xarabank on 12 April. On 13 April, Bezzina performed during the Eurovision in Concert event which was held at the Melkweg venue in Amsterdam, Netherlands and hosted by Marlayne and Linda Wagenmakers. On 16 April, he appeared in Bulgaria during the BNT programme Denyat otblizo s Maria Andonova and performed "Tomorrow" during several programmes in Romania the following day. On 21 April, Bezzina performed during the London Eurovision Party, which was held at the Shadow Lounge in London, United Kingdom and hosted by Nicki French and Paddy O'Connell.

== At Eurovision ==
The Eurovision Song Contest 2013 took place at the Malmö Arena in Malmö, Sweden and consisted of two semi-finals on 14 and 16 May, and the final of 18 May 2013. According to Eurovision rules, all nations with the exceptions of the host country and the "Big Five" (France, Germany, Italy, Spain and the United Kingdom) are required to qualify from one of two semi-finals in order to compete for the final; the top ten countries from each semi-final progress to the final. The European Broadcasting Union (EBU) split up the competing countries into six different pots based on voting patterns from previous contests, with countries with favourable voting histories put into the same pot. On 17 January 2013, an allocation draw was held which placed each country into one of the two semi-finals, as well as which half of the show they would perform in. Malta was placed into the first semi-final, to be held on 16 May 2013, and was scheduled to perform in the first half of the show.

Once all the competing songs for the 2013 contest had been released, the running order for the semi-finals was decided by the shows' producers rather than through another draw, so that similar songs were not placed next to each other. Malta was set to perform in position 6, following the entry from Finland and before the entry from Bulgaria.

The two semi-finals and the final were broadcast in Malta on TVM with commentary by Gordon Bonello and Rodney Gauci. The Maltese spokesperson, who announced the Maltese votes during the final, was Emma Hickey.

=== Semi-final ===
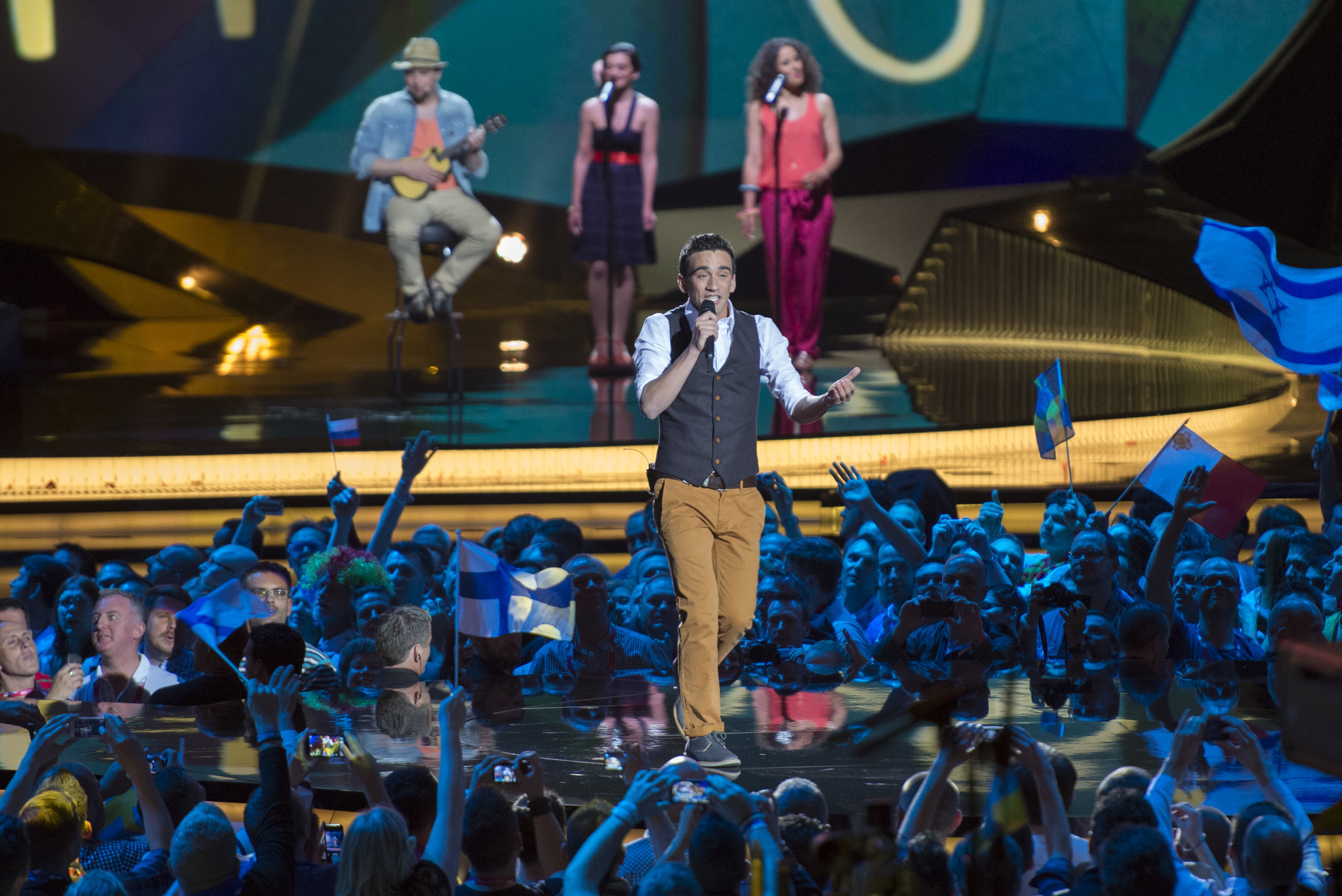
Gianluca during a rehearsal before the second semi-final

Gianluca took part in technical rehearsals on 8 and 11 May, followed by dress rehearsals on 15 and 16 May. This included the jury show on 15 May where the professional juries of each country watched and voted on the competing entries.

The Maltese performance featured Gianluca wearing a white shirt, waistcoat and light brown jeans and performing together with two backing vocalists and three musicians playing the drums, guitar and ukulele. The performance began with the performers on the main stage followed by Gianluca walking out onto the catwalk stage and the backing performers walking to a park bench on the left of the stage which they sat on. The performance was concluded with Gianluca joining the backing performers for the closing lines of the song. The background LED screens projected the lyrics of "Tomorrow" in various animated forms. The backing vocalists that joined Gianluca on stage were Louise Ann Bugeja Tate and Samaria Bezzina, while the musicians were Kenny D'Ugo, Gabriel Cassar and Chris Tate.

At the end of the show, Malta was announced as having finished in the top 10 and consequently qualifying for the grand final. It was later revealed that Malta placed fourth in the semi-final, receiving a total of 118 points.

=== Final ===
Shortly after the first semi-final, a winners' press conference was held for the ten qualifying countries. As part of this press conference, the qualifying artists took part in a draw to determine which half of the grand final they would subsequently participate in. This draw was done in the order the countries appeared in the semi-final running order. Malta was drawn to compete in the first half. Following this draw, the shows' producers decided upon the running order of the final, as they had done for the semi-finals. Malta was subsequently placed to perform in position 9, following the entry from Belarus and before the entry from Russia.

Gianluca once again took part in dress rehearsals on 17 and 18 May before the final, including the jury final where the professional juries cast their final votes before the live show. Gianluca performed a repeat of his semi-final performance during the final on 18 May. Malta placed eighth in the final, scoring 120 points.

=== Voting ===
Voting during the three shows consisted of 50 percent public televoting and 50 percent from a jury deliberation. The jury consisted of five music industry professionals who were citizens of the country they represent. This jury was asked to judge each contestant based on: vocal capacity; the stage performance; the song's composition and originality; and the overall impression by the act. In addition, no member of a national jury could be related in any way to any of the competing acts in such a way that they cannot vote impartially and independently.

Following the release of the full split voting by the EBU after the conclusion of the competition, it was revealed that Malta had placed ninth with both the public televote and the jury vote in the final. In the public vote, Malta received an average rank of 10.97, while with the jury vote, Malta received an average rank of 9.54. In the second semi-final, Malta placed seventh with the public televote with an average rank of 7.78 and first with the jury vote with an average rank of 3.40.

Below is a breakdown of points awarded to Malta and awarded by Malta in the first semi-final and grand final of the contest. The nation awarded its 12 points to Azerbaijan in the semi-final and the final of the contest.

==== Points awarded to Malta ====
Points awarded to Malta (Semi-final 2)
Score	Country
12 points	Azerbaijan; Macedonia; Norway
10 points	San Marino
8 points	Hungary
7 points	Armenia; Romania; Switzerland
6 points	Albania; Georgia; Iceland; Latvia
5 points	Finland; Germany; Greece
4 points	
3 points	
2 points	France; Israel
1 point	

Points awarded to Malta (Final)
Score	Country
12 points	
10 points	Italy; Norway; San Marino
8 points	Azerbaijan; Hungary; Netherlands
7 points	Belarus; United Kingdom
6 points	Armenia
5 points	Estonia; Germany; Iceland; Latvia; Romania
4 points	Denmark
3 points	Cyprus; Georgia; Greece; Macedonia
2 points	France; Ukraine
1 point	Spain

==== Points awarded by Malta ====
Points awarded by Malta (Semi-final 2)
Score	Country
12 points	Azerbaijan
10 points	Romania
8 points	Armenia
7 points	Greece
6 points	San Marino
5 points	Macedonia
4 points	Georgia
3 points	Norway
2 points	Switzerland
1 point	Finland

Points awarded by Malta (Final)
Score	Country
12 points	Azerbaijan
10 points	Ukraine
8 points	Italy
7 points	Romania
6 points	Denmark
5 points	United Kingdom
4 points	Greece
3 points	Norway
2 points	Belarus
1 point	Armenia
