= Muxu =

Maltese singer-songwriter (born 1990)

- Born: Matthew Mercieca; 19 July 1990 (age 36); Msida, Malta
- Occupations: Singer; songwriter

Matthew Mercieca (born 19 July 1990), known professionally as Muxu, is a Maltese singer, songwriter, and author.

== Career ==
Muxu began his career as a singer, releasing his debut single, "Beat My Drum", in 2008. The song reached number one on the Maltese charts and led to a nomination for Best Newcomer at the 2008 Bay Music Awards.

Between 2008 and 2015, Muxu continued releasing music in Malta. During this period, he achieved three number-one singles on local charts and received multiple nominations at both the Bay Music Awards and the Malta Music Awards. In 2010, he won the Bay Music Award for Best Solo Artist.

Alongside his work as a recording artist, Muxu has been active as a songwriter, writing songs for multiple Maltese artists. He has contributed to nine of Malta’s entries across the Junior Eurovision Song Contest and the Eurovision Song Contest, including two winning Junior Eurovision entries.

Muxu co-wrote the song "10", performed by Maltese singer Georgia Borg during her audition on series 13 of Britain’s Got Talent, where the performance received the Golden Buzzer from judge Alesha Dixon.

In 2025, Muxu self-published his first book, Beautifully Lost. The release was accompanied by an album of the same title, with the book and music intended to be experienced together as part of a single creative project.

== Eurovision Song Contest ==
At the Junior Eurovision Song Contest, Muxu wrote or co-wrote songs for multiple Maltese representatives. His work includes two winning entries: "The Start", performed by Gaia Cauchi in 2013, and "Not My Soul", performed by Destiny Chukunyerein 2015.

His other contributions include: "Diamonds", performed by Federica Falzon in 2014; "Parachute", performed by Christina Magrin in 2016; "My Home", performed by Ike and Kaya in 2021; "I Believe", performed by Eliza Borg in 2025; and "Blue Bird", performed by Beppe in 2026. In addition to competing entries, Muxu was involved in writing the common song performed by all participating artists at the Junior Eurovision Song Contest in 2014, 2015, and 2016.

Muxu has also contributed as a songwriter to Malta’s selections for the Eurovision Song Contest. His adult Eurovision credits include "Warrior", performed by Amber Bondinin 2015, and "Taboo", performed by Christabelle Borgin 2018. In 2025, he co-wrote "Serving" (originally titled "Kant"), performed by Miriana Conte.

== Beautifully Lost ==
Beautifully Lostis a self-published memoir by Muxu, released on 13 November 2025, alongside an accompanying studio album of the same title. The book focuses on a period when he felt most lost in his life, prompting him to book a one-way journey that became a turning point in his personal and creative path.

The memoir follows his travels through twelve countries over nine months, reflecting on the experiences, challenges, and lessons he learned along the way. The album consists of twelve original songs, all written and co-produced by Muxu, and features collaborations with several Maltese artists. As part of the project’s integrated format, twelve of the book’s twenty-eight chapters include QR codes that link to a song connected to the chapter the reader has just read.
