= Jessika Muscat =

Maltese singer and actress (born 1989)

Jessika
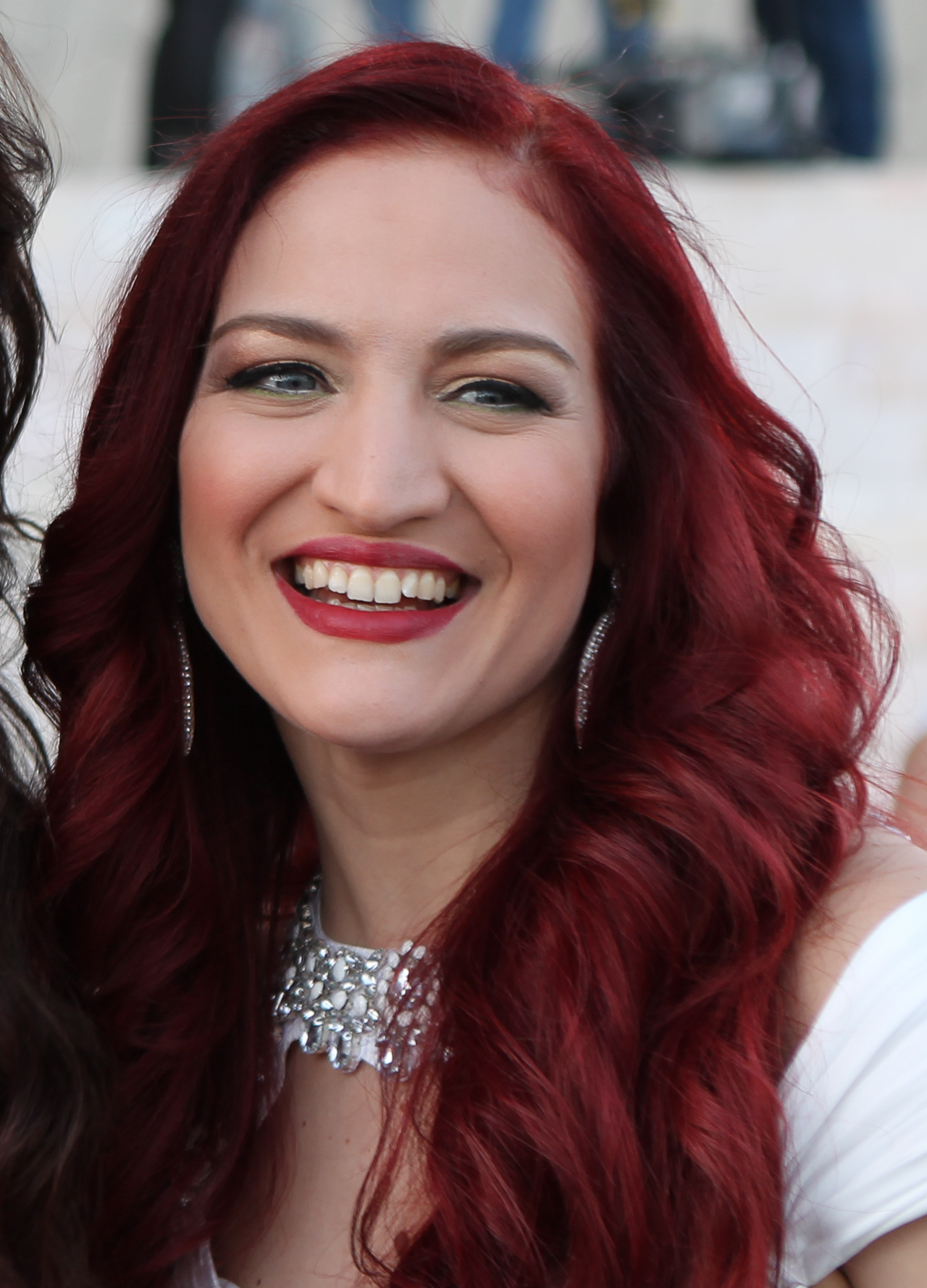
- Muscat in 2018

Background information
- Born: Jessica Muscat; 27 February 1989 (age 37); Mosta, Malta
- Genre: pop
- Occupations: Singer, actress
- Instrument: Vocals
- Years active: 2009-present

Jessica Muscat (born 27 February 1989 in Mosta, Malta), more commonly known as Jessika is a Maltese singer and actress. She represented San Marino in the Eurovision Song Contest 2018 in Lisbon, Portugal, with the song "Who We Are", alongside Jenifer Brening. She had previously attempted to represent her home country every year from 2008 to 2017 and in the Junior Eurovision Song Contest 2004 with the song "Precious Time". As an actress, she plays the character of Emma on daily Maltese soap opera Ħbieb u Għedewwa.

== Eurovision attempts ==
=== Junior Eurovision Song Contest ===
Maltese national selection

Year	Title	Place
2004	"Precious Time"	16th

=== Eurovision Song Contest ===
Maltese national selection

Year	Title	Place
2006	"Let Me Dream"	DNQ
2008	"Tangled"	DNQ
2009	"Smoke-screen"	DNQ
2010	"Fake"	DNQ
2011	"Down Down Down"	15th
2012	"Dance Romance"	DNQ
2013	"Ultraviolet"	8th
2014	"Hypnotica"	8th
2015	"Fandango"	9th
2016	"The Flame"	7th
2017	Multiple (Note: In 2017, Muscat reached multiple entries to the Maltese national selection: "Edge of Tomorrow", "Immortal" and "Let There Be Light". However, none of them qualified from the preliminary round.)	DNQ
2022	"Kaleidoscope"	17th
2023	"Unapologetic"	DNQ

Sammarinese national selection

Year	Title	Place
2018	"Who We Are" (featuring Jenifer Brening)	1st

== Discography ==
=== Singles ===
Title	Year	Album
"Golden Ways"	2012	Non-album singles
"Who We Are" (featuring Jenifer Brening)	2018	Non-album singles
"No la conoces"	2019	Non-album singles
"Kaleidoscope"	2022	
''Unapologetic''	2023	

== Notes ==
Preceded by Valentina Monetta & Jimmie Wilson with "Spirit of the Night"	San Marino in the Eurovision Song Contest with Jenifer Brening; 2018	Succeeded by Serhat with "Say Na Na Na"
