= Peppi Azzopardi =

Maltese TV personality

- Born: Joe Azzopardi; 25 August 1959 (age 67); Malta
- Occupation: Presenter
- Years active: 1997–present
- Spouse: Mandy Micallef Grimaud

Joseph "Peppi" Azzopardi (born August 25, 1959), from Floriana is a Maltese TV personality, best known for hosting Malta's longest-lasting TV programme and most popular talk show Xarabank from 1997 to 2020 every Friday evenings on Television Malta. He also hosts L-Istrina, a yearly telethon programme, televised every Boxing Day across the three main terrestrial TV stations in Malta. Azzopardi is also a founder of the TV production company "Where's Everybody".

Peppi is also a staunch defender of illegal immigrants coming to Malta seeking a better life. In 2020, he had suggested that Maltese families should open their hearts to the plight of illegal immigrants, and start to welcome them into their homes. This statement proved to be highly controversial, since he was heavily criticised by the general public because of this stance.
