= Christabelle Borg =

Maltese singer-songwriter (born 1992)

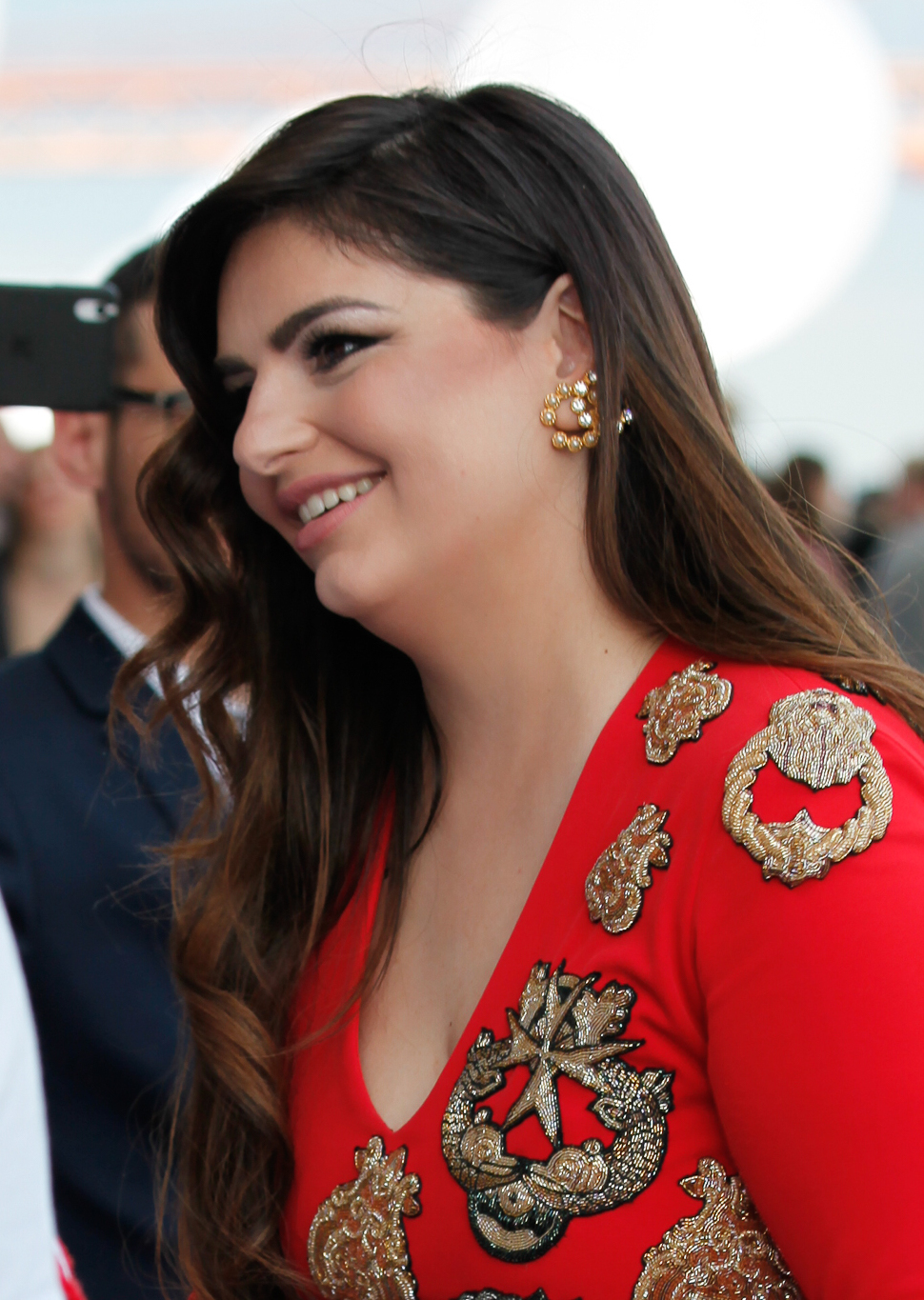
- Borg in 2018

Background information
- Also known as: Christabelle
- Born: 28 April 1992 (age 34); Mġarr, Malta
- Genres: Pop; dance-pop; R&B
- Occupations: Singer; songwriter; television presenter
- Instrument: Vocals
- Years active: 2009–2022

Christabelle Borg (born 28 April 1992), sometimes known mononymously as Christabelle, is a Maltese singer, songwriter, and television presenter. She represented Malta in the Eurovision Song Contest 2018 in Lisbon, Portugal, with the song "Taboo", but failed to qualify for the final, finishing in 13th place with 101 points.

== Early life ==
Borg was born on 1992 in Mġarr village in the Northern Region of Malta. She later studied music at Mount St. Mary's College, graduating in 2014. Afterwards, she studied accounting at the University of Malta and graduated with a Master's degree in 2015.

== Career ==
Borg began her career as a teenager, hosting the Maltese television shows Teen Trouble and Teen Traffic. In 2005 she tried to represent Malta in the Junior Eurovision Song Contest 2005 with the song "Going wild". In 2014, Borg took part in Malta Eurovision Song Contest 2014 with the song "Lovetricity", placing eighth in the final. She returned to the competition in 2015 with the song "Rush" and 2016 with the song "Kingdom", placing second and fourth, respectively.

In 2018, she returned to Malta Eurovision Song Contest for the fourth time with the song "Taboo", winning the competition. She represented Malta in the Eurovision Song Contest 2018 in Lisbon, Portugal.

Maltese singer Christabelle gives an interview to Wikipedia during the Eurovision Song Contest 2018.

== Discography ==
=== Singles ===
Title	Year	Album
"I Wanna Know"	2009	Non-album singles
"Flame"	2009	Non-album singles
"Naturally"	2009	Non-album singles
"Everytime I Bleed"	2009	Non-album singles
"Everything About You"	2011	Non-album singles
"Say"	2012	Non-album singles
"Fall for You"	2013	Non-album singles
"Bay Kids Song"	2013	Non-album singles
"Lovetricity"	2014	Non-album singles
"Rush"	2015	Non-album singles
"Kingdom"	2016	Non-album singles
"Never Gone"	2017	Non-album singles
"Taboo"	2018	Non-album singles
"Breathe"	2021	Non-album singles

Awards and achievements
Preceded by Claudia Faniello with "Breathlessly"	Malta in the Eurovision Song Contest; 2018	Succeeded by Michela Pace with "Chameleon"
