= Needing You (song) =

2013 song by Kevin Borg

"Needing You" is a song by Maltese singer and Idol 2008 winner Kevin Borg with which he hoped to represent Malta in the Eurovision Song Contest 2013 in Malmö. The song is written and produced by Kevin Borg himself and Swedish producers Simon Gribbe, Dan Attlerud, Thomas Thörnholm and Michael Clauss. The song came in second place in the Maltese national final.
