= Amber Bondin =

Maltese singer

Amber
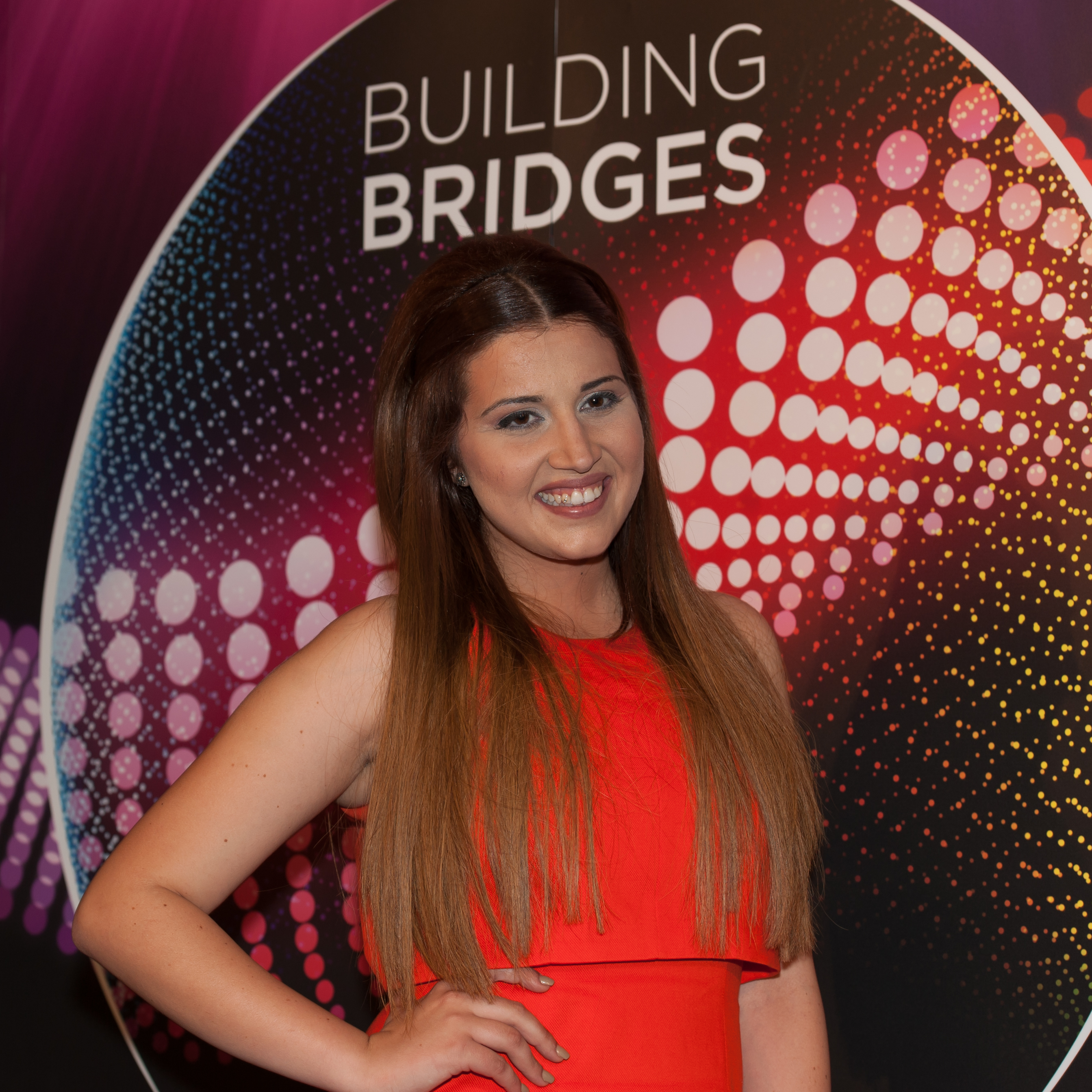
- Bondin in 2015

Background information
- Also known as: Amber
- Born: Amber Bondin; 26 May 1991 (age 35); Kalkara, Malta
- Origin: Malta
- Genres: Pop, R&B
- Occupations: Singer, Songwriter
- Instrument: Vocals,
- Years active: 2010-present
- Labels: WickedandLoud; Believe Digital
- Website: amberofficial.com

Amber Bondin (born 26 May 1991), also known mononymously as Amber, is a Maltese singer. She represented Malta in the 2015 Eurovision Song Contest.

== Career ==
=== Eurovision Song Contest ===
Due to a change in the rules and regulations for the competition announced by the Maltese broadcaster, PBS, for the first time the artist, author and composer of the winning entry were permitted to change parts of the winning song or select a new song entirely. It was later confirmed on 7 March 2015 that Amber's winning song, "Warrior" would indeed be modified, and the new version along with its music video was premièred on 9 March 2015.

Amber failed to qualify to the final and finished in 11th place out of 17 countries with a total of 43 points.

== Discography ==
=== Singles ===
Title	Year	Peak chart positions	Album
"Catch 22"	2011	—	Non-album single(s)
"Touch Wood"	2011	—	Non-album single(s)
"Answer With Your Eyes"	2012	—	Non-album single(s)
"In Control"	2013	—	Non-album single(s)
"Because I Have You"	2014	—	Non-album single(s)
"Warrior"	2014	—	Non-album single(s)
"What They Say"	2016	—	Redemption
"Last Night"	2016	—	Redemption
"Messed Up Love"	2016	—	Redemption
"No Neverland"	2016	—	Redemption
"Power"	2018	—	Redemption
"Tifkiriet"	2018	2	Non-album single(s)
"Forsi Jien Forsi Int"	2018	—	Non-album single(s)
"Alive"	2019	—	Non-album single
"Untaggable"	2019	—	Redemption
"That’s Life"	2019	—	Non-album single(s)
"Free (Nanna’s Song)"	2020	—	Non-album single(s)
"Oazi – Sterjotipi feat. Amber"	2020	2	Monstri – Sterjotipi
"Put Away Your Money"	2021	—	

== See also ==
- Malta in the Eurovision Song Contest 2015

Awards and achievements
Preceded by Firelight with "Coming Home"	Malta in the Eurovision Song Contest; 2015	Succeeded by Ira Losco with "Chameleon"
