= Xarabank =

Maltese talk show

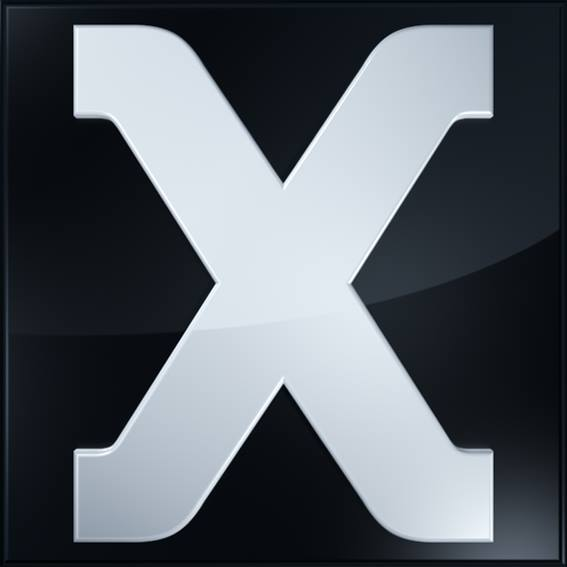
- Genre: Talk show
- Directed by: Xandru Azzopardi
- Presented by: Peppi Azzopardi; Mark Laurence Zammit
- Voices of: Peter John "PJ" Vassallo; Mark Laurence Zammit
- Theme music composer: Elton Zarb
- Country of origin: Malta
- Original language: Maltese

Production
- Executive producer: Vassallo
- Production locations: WE MEDIA; Gwardamanġa, Malta
- Production company: WE MEDIA

Original release
- Network: Television Malta
- Release: 4 April 1997 – June 2020

Related
- Bijografiji

Xarabank was a prime time talk show produced by Where's Everybody that aired every Friday on the Maltese national television station TVM, till 2020. The show was presented by Peppi Azzopardi, and later by Mark Laurence Zammit. Various topics are discussed, from politics to hobbies.

== Etymology ==
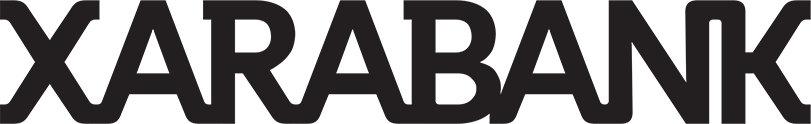
Xarabank new logo (2016)

The name comes from the Maltese word xarabank for "bus", as on a Maltese bus one finds different people with different opinions who end up discussing and arguing on different topics.

== History ==
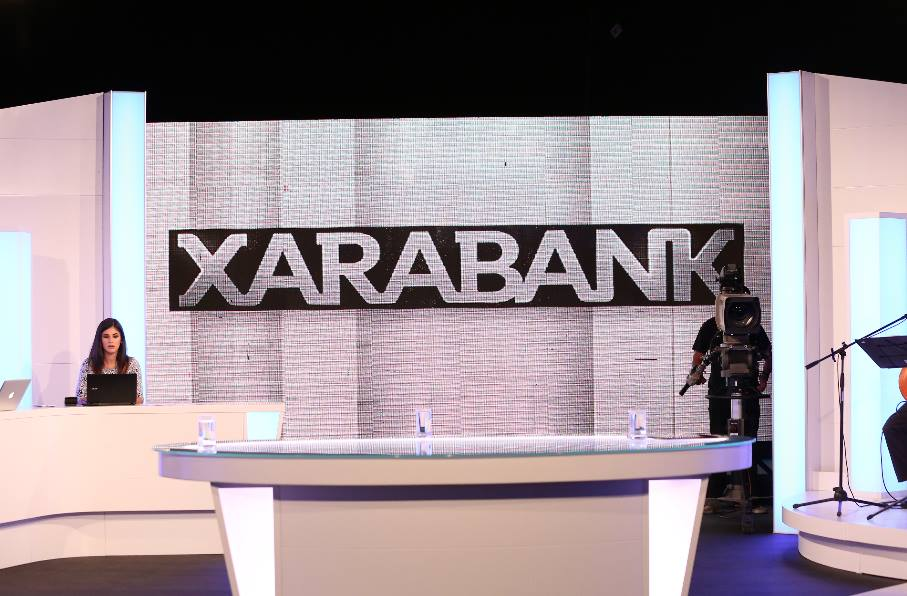
Xarabank new set

Xarabank's previous logo up to 2016

Xarabank was Malta's most watched television programme. Xarabank was broadcast every Friday evening on TVM, Malta's national TV station, between October and July each year and has been on air since 4 April 1997 till 2020. Xarabank investigates, discusses different issues and sometimes entertains.

In 2016, Xarabank launched its new official website: www.xarabank.com.mt. While a complete re-brand of the whole programme was done, making it more news oriented. Orange was replaced by black as the main colour for the brand, with hints of red and blue. A phrase commonly used by the host Peppi Azzoppardi was fil-qosor, translated to "in short", asking participants to keep their thoughts brief. It has since become an iconic phrase linked to the show.
