= Music of Malta =

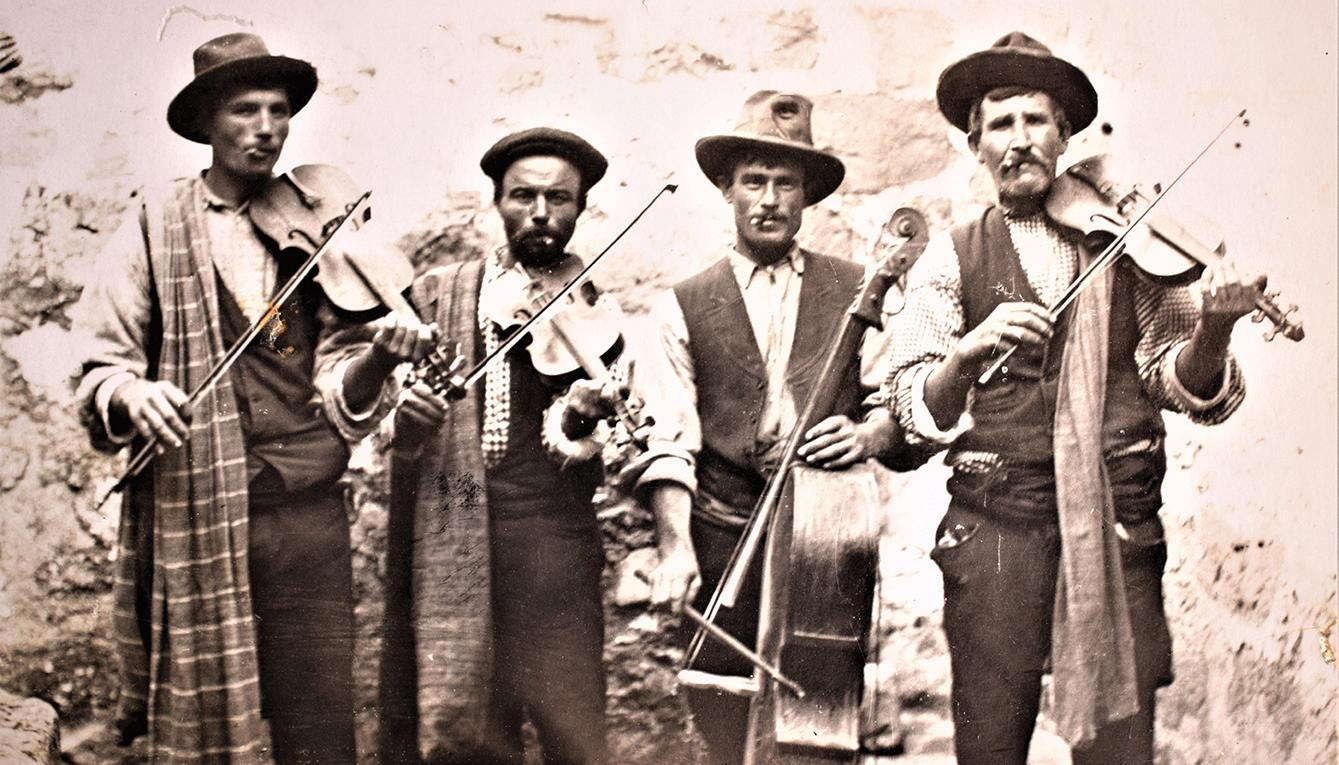
Popular Gozitan musicians known as Id-Dudi, 1910s. Photo Mikiel Farrugia

The music of Malta ranges across a spectrum of genres such as traditional folk music, metal and various forms of electronica.

== History ==
Għana (pronounced aana) is the traditional folk music of Malta. A type of singing which "involves a tight voice type with the straining of throat muscles and controlled use of diaphragm muscles to produce a loud sound". The most common style in the modern day is the spirtu pront (literally 'quick witted'); which is an improvised rhyming song-duel which is performed by either four or six għannejja ('singers', pronounced anneyya), and accompanied on guitars.

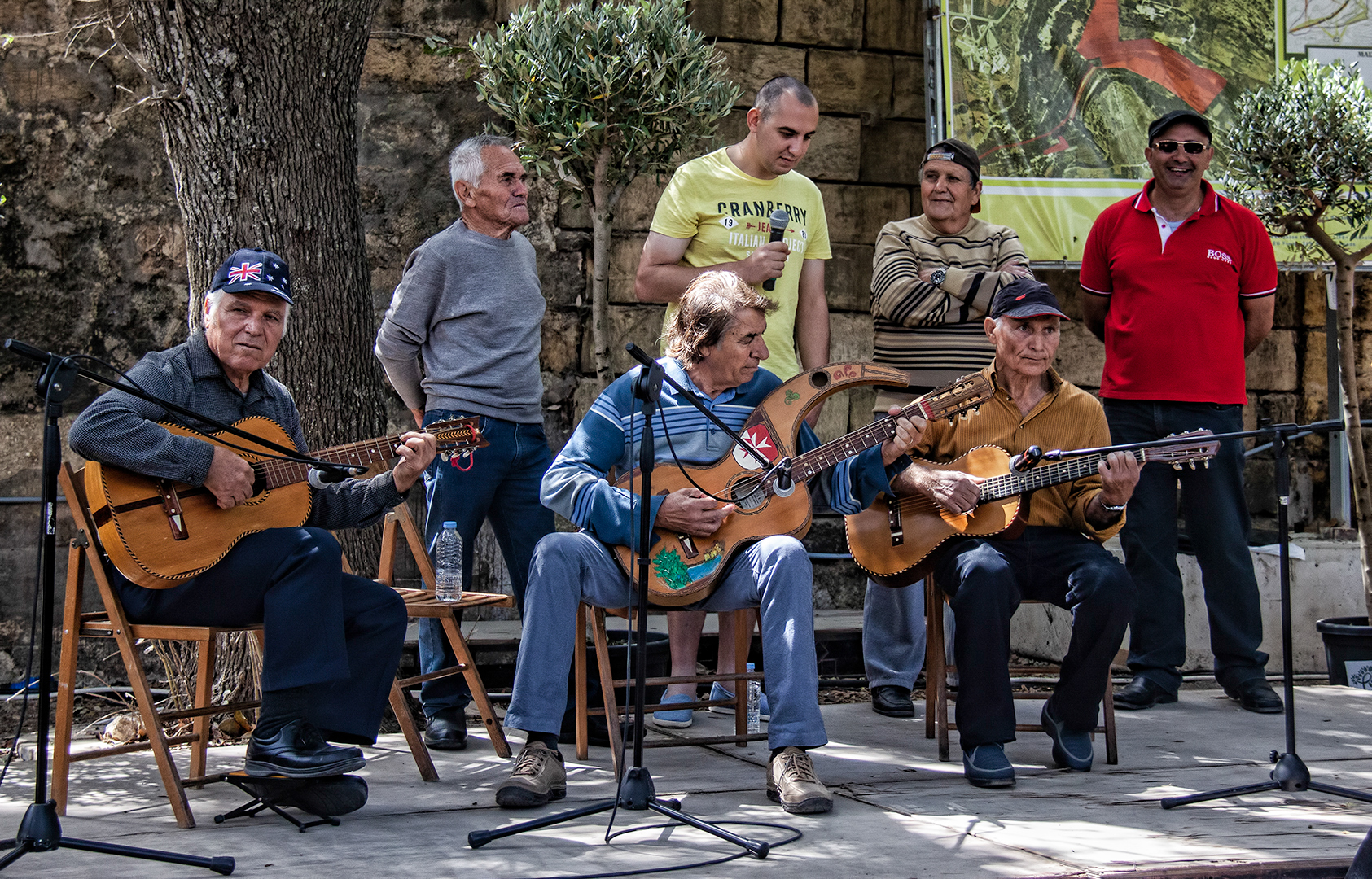
L-għannejja in Buskett Gardens, 2016

Malta organises its own Malta Song Festival yearly since 1960.

In 1971 Joe Grech was the first singer to represent Malta in the Eurovision Song Contest. Andy Partridge from XTC was born on Malta in 1953. Later, Thea Garrett won the Malta Song for Europe 2010 called My Dream. Lynn Chircop represented Malta at Eurovision 2003 with the pop song "To Dream Again". It was sung in Riga with 5 additional backing singers on the stage. Chircop got 4 points at the end of the voting process. Morena is another artist who is a winner of Malta Song for Europe 2008 called VODKA. Klinsmann participated in Malta Song for Europe in 2007 (She Gives me Wings) and 2008 (Go finalist song). Claudia Faniello was the second runner up in Malta Song for Europe 2008 who participated with the songs Caravaggio and Sunrise. Chiara represented Malta in Eurovision a total of 3 times: 1998, 2005, 2009. Gaia Cauchi represented and won for Malta in the Junior Eurovision Song Contest in 2013. Gianluca Bezzina represented Malta in 2013. Destiny Chukunyere represented and won for Malta in the Junior Eurovision Song Contest in 2015. Chukunyere represented Malta at Eurovision 2020 after winning the Maltese version of X Factor.

== Bibliography ==
- Marcello Sorce Keller. “Malta, History, Culture and Geography of Music”, Janet Sturman (ed.) The SAGE Encyclopedia of Music and Culture. Los Angeles: SAGE Reference, 2019, Vol. III, 1382–1384.
- Marcello Sorce Keller. “Malta, Modern and Contemporary Performance Practice”, Janet Sturman (ed.) The SAGE Encyclopedia of Music and Culture. Los Angeles: SAGE Reference, 2019, Vol. III, 1384–1386.
- Farrugia, A. (2021) The Story Of A Maltese Musician: A biography of Maestro Antonio Micallef 1867, ISBN 979-8-5125-7445-4

== Artists ==
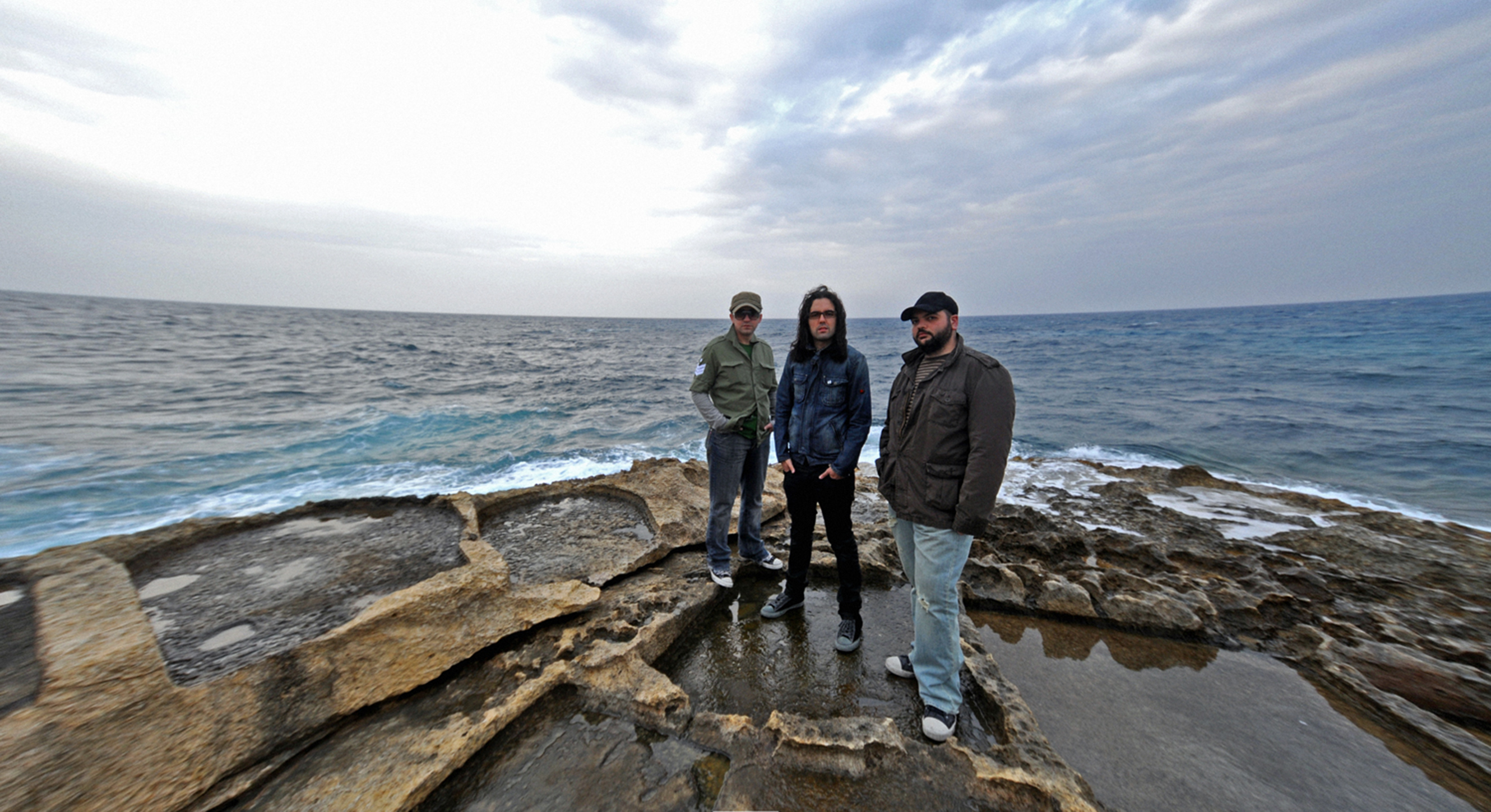
Bitterside

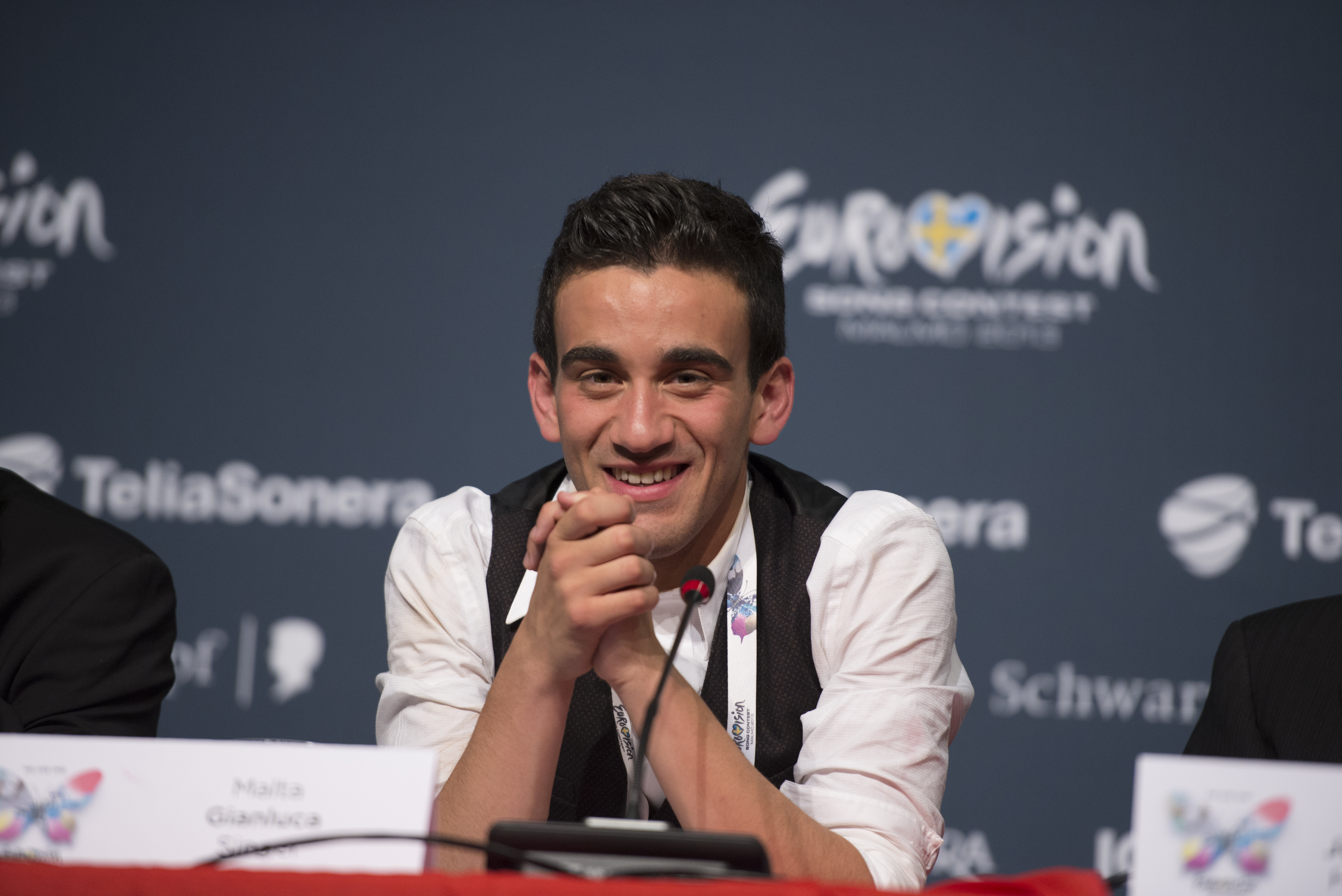
Gianluca Bezzina

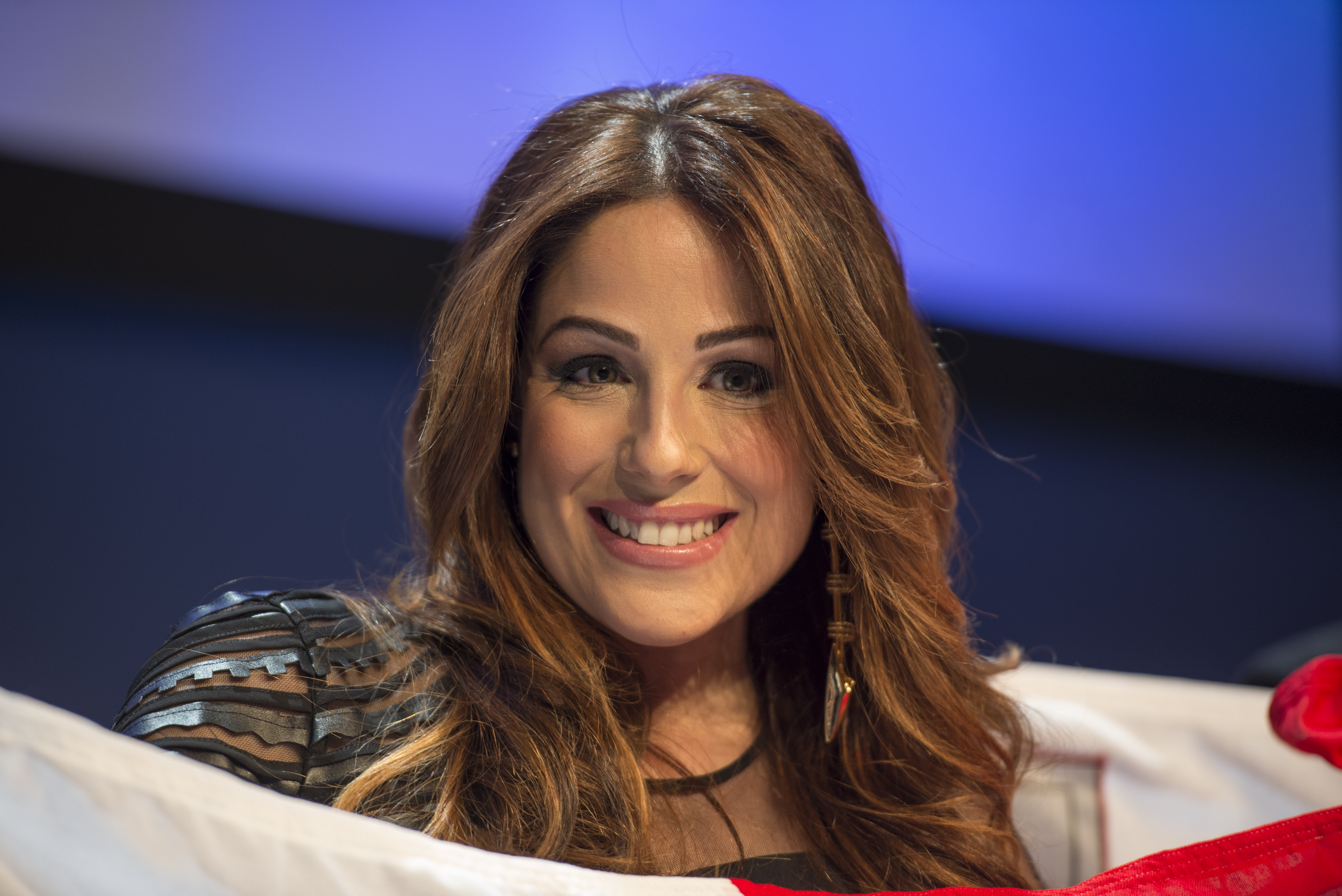
Ira Losco

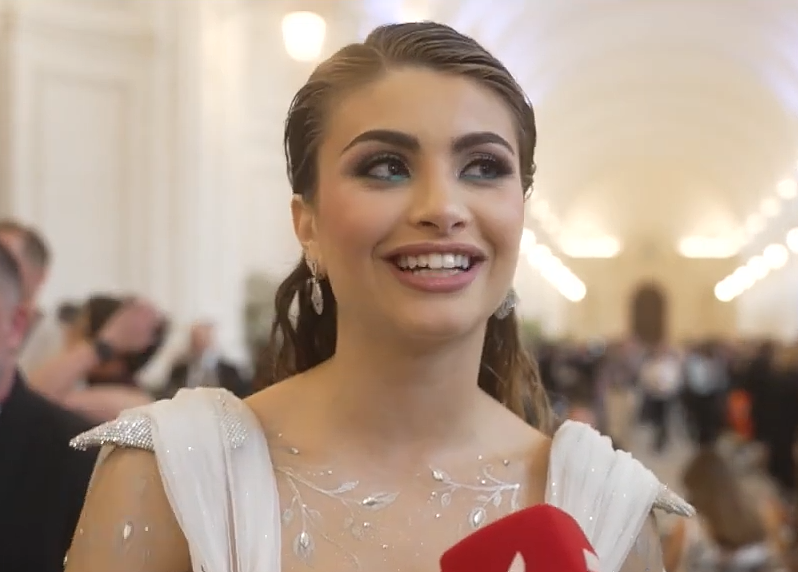
Emma Muscat

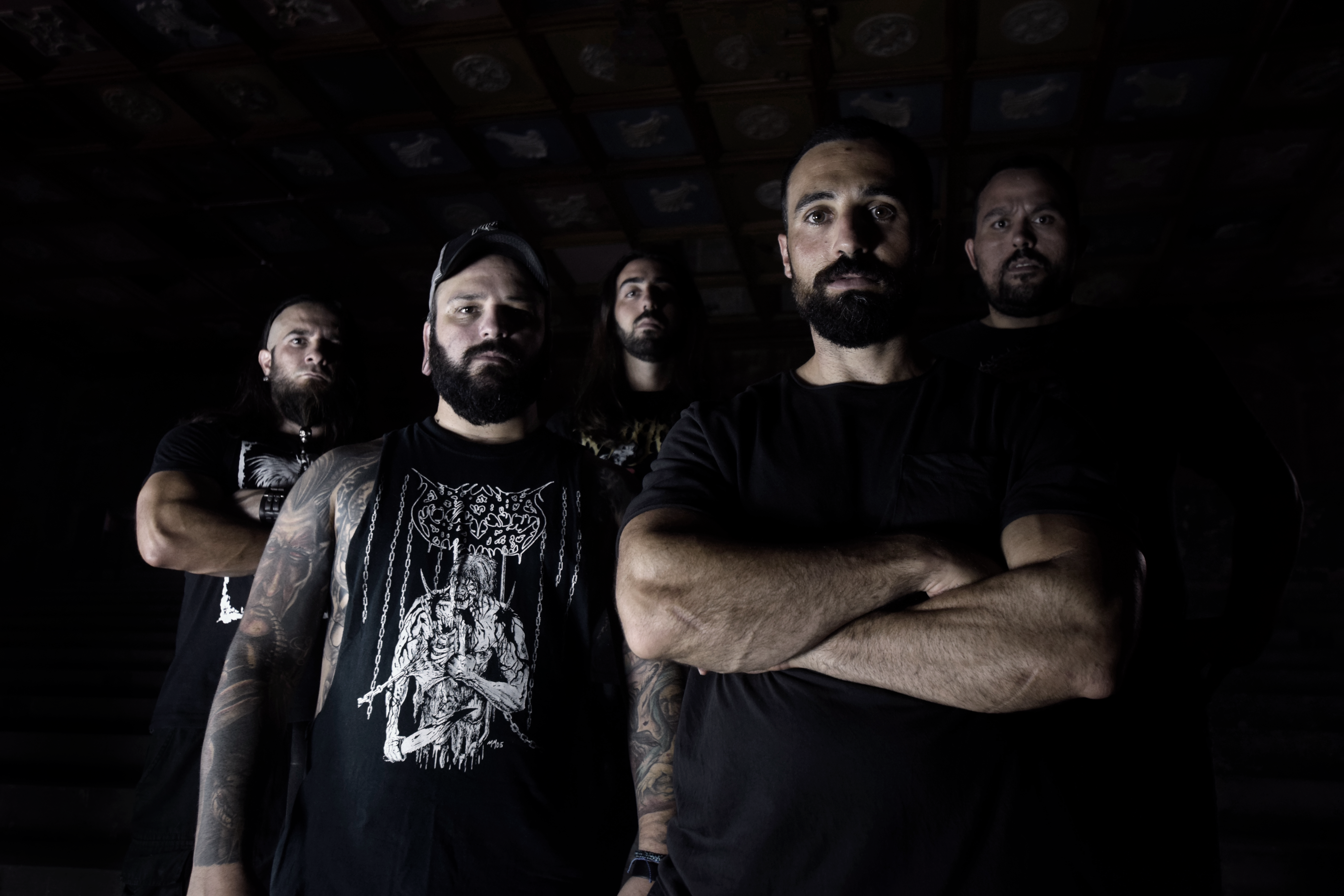
Abysmal Torment

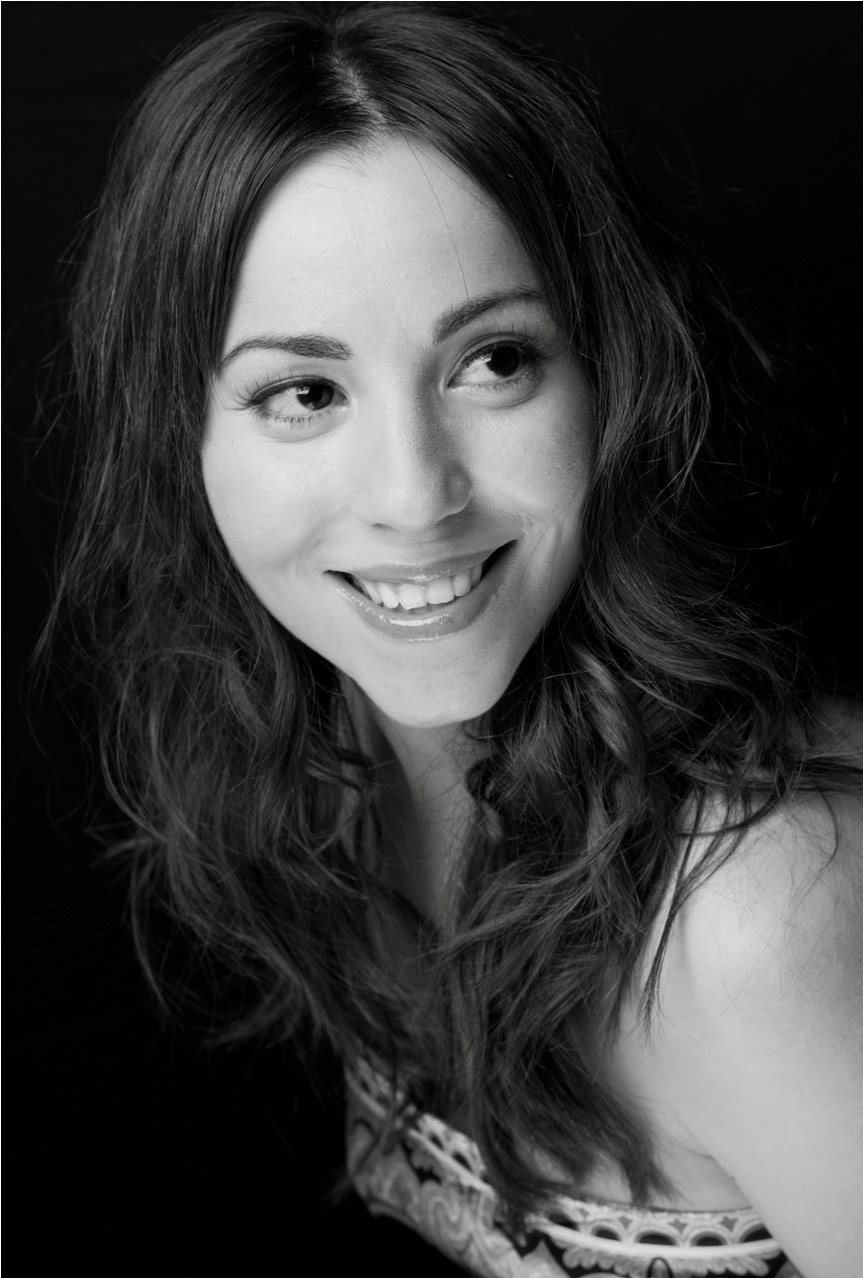
Julie Zahra

- Abysmal Torment
- Adrian V
- Antonio Olivari
- Apotheosis
- Beangrowers
- Beheaded
- Bitterside
- Chiara
- Debbie Scerri
- Destiny
- Emma Muscat
- Etnika
- Fabrizio Faniello
- Gabriela N
- Gianluca Bezzina
- Grandayy
- Gaia Cauchi
- Hooligan
- Ira Losco
- Jennings
- Jessika Muscat
- Julie Zahra
- Joe Grech
- Lithomancy
- Ludwig Galea
- Mary Spiteri
- Miss Roberta
- The Myth (band)
- Olivia Lewis
- Ray Buttigieg
- Red Electric
- Renato Micallef
- Renzo Spiteri
- Roger Scannura
- Stalko
- Tenishia
- The Travellers
- Walter Micallef
- Wintermoods

== See also ==
- Malta International Music Competitions, Valletta/Mdina, Malta
- List of classical music competitions
- Malta in the Eurovision Song Contest
- Malta in the Junior Eurovision Song Contest
- Malta Music Awards
- Malta Philharmonic Orchestra

=== Instruments ===
- Żaqq
- Friction drum
