= The Voice Kids (Maltese TV series) =

German television program

- Genre: Reality television
- Created by: John de Mol Jr.
- Presented by: Maxine Pace (2–); Sarah Bajada (1)
- Judges: Gianluca Bezzina (1–2); Owen Leuellen (1); Destiny Chukunyere; Sarah Bonnici (2); Aleandro Spiteri Monsigneur (3–); Gaia Cauchi (3–)
- Country of origin: Malta
- Original languages: Maltese; English
- No. of seasons: 3
- No. of episodes: 27

Production
- Executive producer: John de Mol
- Production locations: Manoel Theatre, Valletta (Blind auditions, Battles and Sing-Offs); MFCC, Ta' Qali (Grand finale)
- Running time: 30 minutes (Blind auditions, Battles and Sing-Offs); 120-150 minutes (Grand finale)
- Production company: Greatt Company Limited

Original release
- Network: TVM
- Release: 7 October 2022 – present

Related
- The Voice (franchise); The Voice Kids

The Voice Kids is a Maltese reality talent show created by John de Mol Jr. Based on the original The Voice Kids of Holland, the show was developed for children between the ages of 9 and 14. It began airing on TVM on 7 September 2022.

There are four different stages to the show: blind auditions, battle rounds, sing-offs, and final. There have been three winners to date: Dawn Desira (12), Eliza Borg (12), and Beppe Caruana (11).

During the inaugural season, Sarah Bajada served as host, later being replaced by Maxine Pace starting in season two. The coaches for the most recent third season were Destiny Chukunyere Aleandro Spiteri Monsigneur, and Gaia Cauchi. Other coaches from previous seasons include Owen Leuellen, Gianluca Bezzina, and Sarah Bonnici.

== Format ==
In 2022, Public Broadcasting Services (PBS) announced that they will produce a children and senior's version of The Voice's franchise with Talpa and Greatt Company Limited. The Voice Kids, is based on the format of the original show and focuses on children between the ages of 8 and 14. Performers for the first season had to apply to participate, and about 60 children were cast for the first phase, the "Blind Auditions". The children are onstage with a large, curved curtain around them, effectively concealing their identity from the judges, audience, and viewers. The 3 jury members are sitting in swivel chairs with their backs to the stage.

During the performance, they can elect to support a candidate by pressing a buzzer, which will automatically turn their seat towards the stage. At the end of their performance, the curtain drops, revealing the singer who then learns whether any chairs turned for them. If only one judge turns their chair, the candidate is automatically on their team. If more than one chair turns, the candidate chooses who they would like to have as their coach.

The second week of the competition is training week in which the coaches prepare their candidates for the second phase of competition, called the "Battle Round." In the Battle Round three/four candidates of the same coaching group are chosen to sing the same song. Each coach then picks one of their candidates to continue on to the Final round. The remaining coaches can steal one losing artist from the battle rounds via "Steal Button."

The winner of The Voice Kids receives a training stipend of €10,000 and an optional recording contract. The parents of the victor decide whether they pursue this option or not. In addition, starting from the second season, the winner of The Voice Kids was selected to represent Malta at the Junior Eurovision Song Contest .

== Coaches ==
The Voice Kids coaches
Coach	Seasons		
Coach	1	2	3
Gianluca Bezzina			
Destiny Chukunyere			
Owen Leuellen			
Sarah Bonnici			
Aleandro Spiteri Monsigneur			
Gaia Cauchi			

Coaches gallery

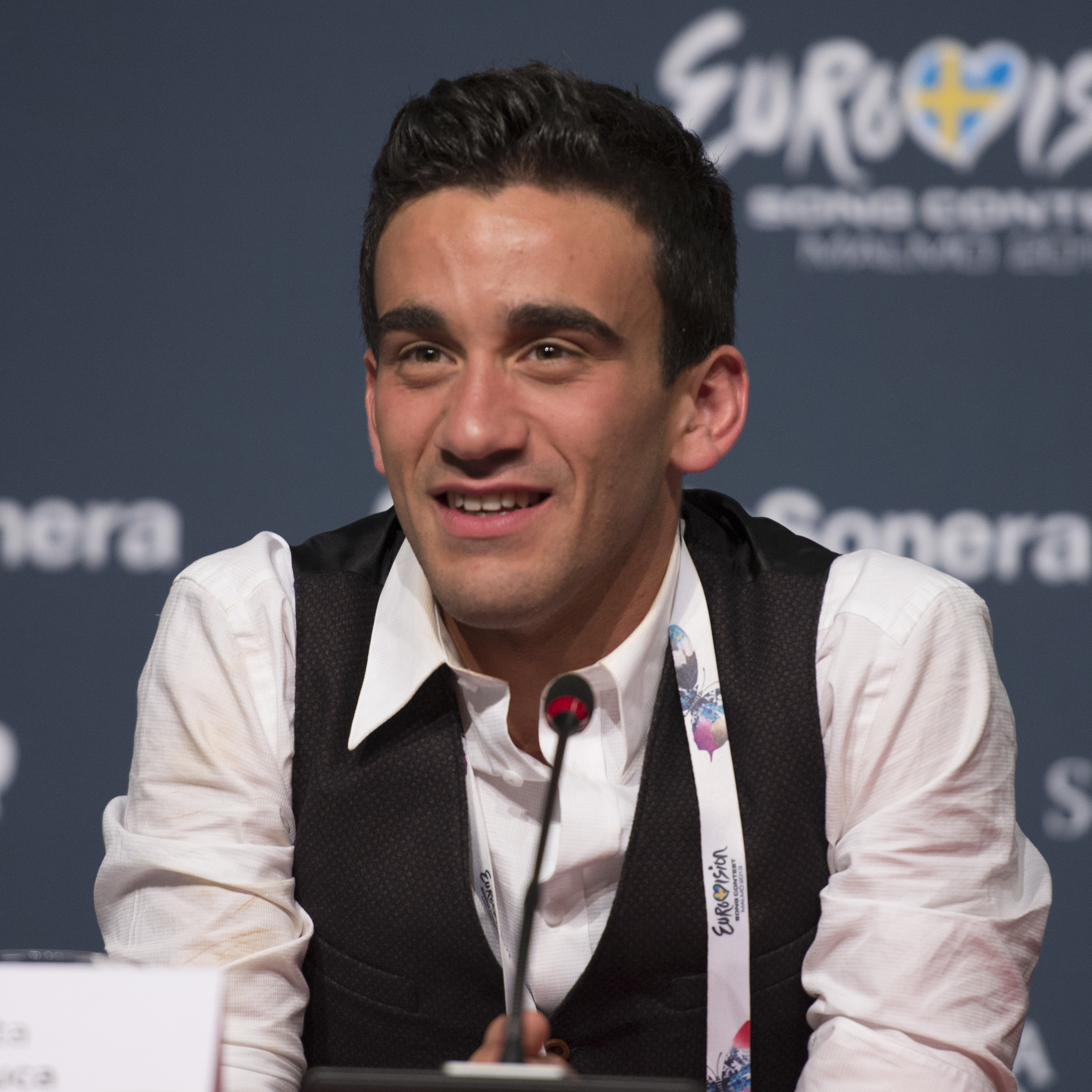
Gianluca Bezzina (2022–2025)

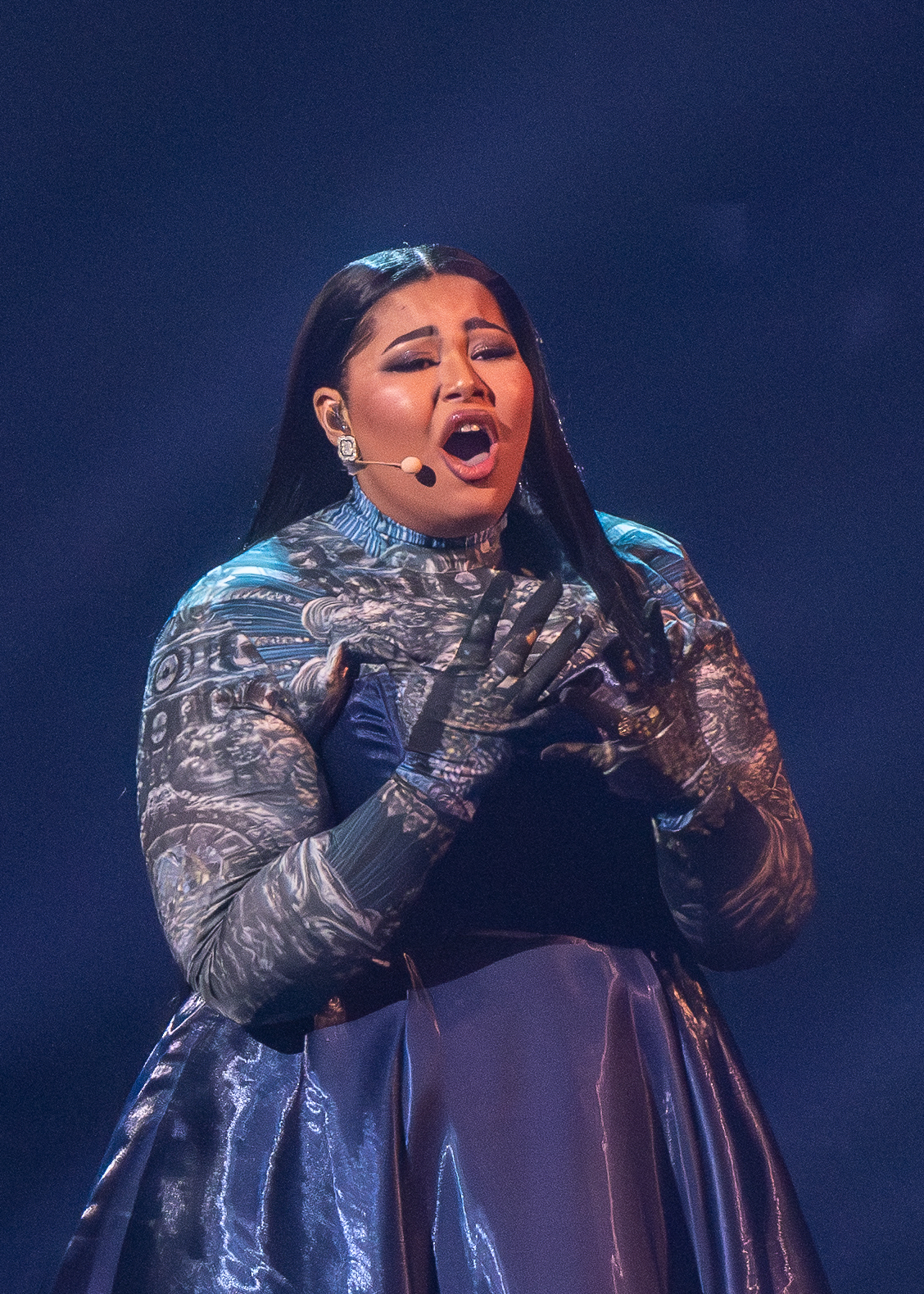
Destiny Chukunyere (2022–)

Owen Leuellen (2022)

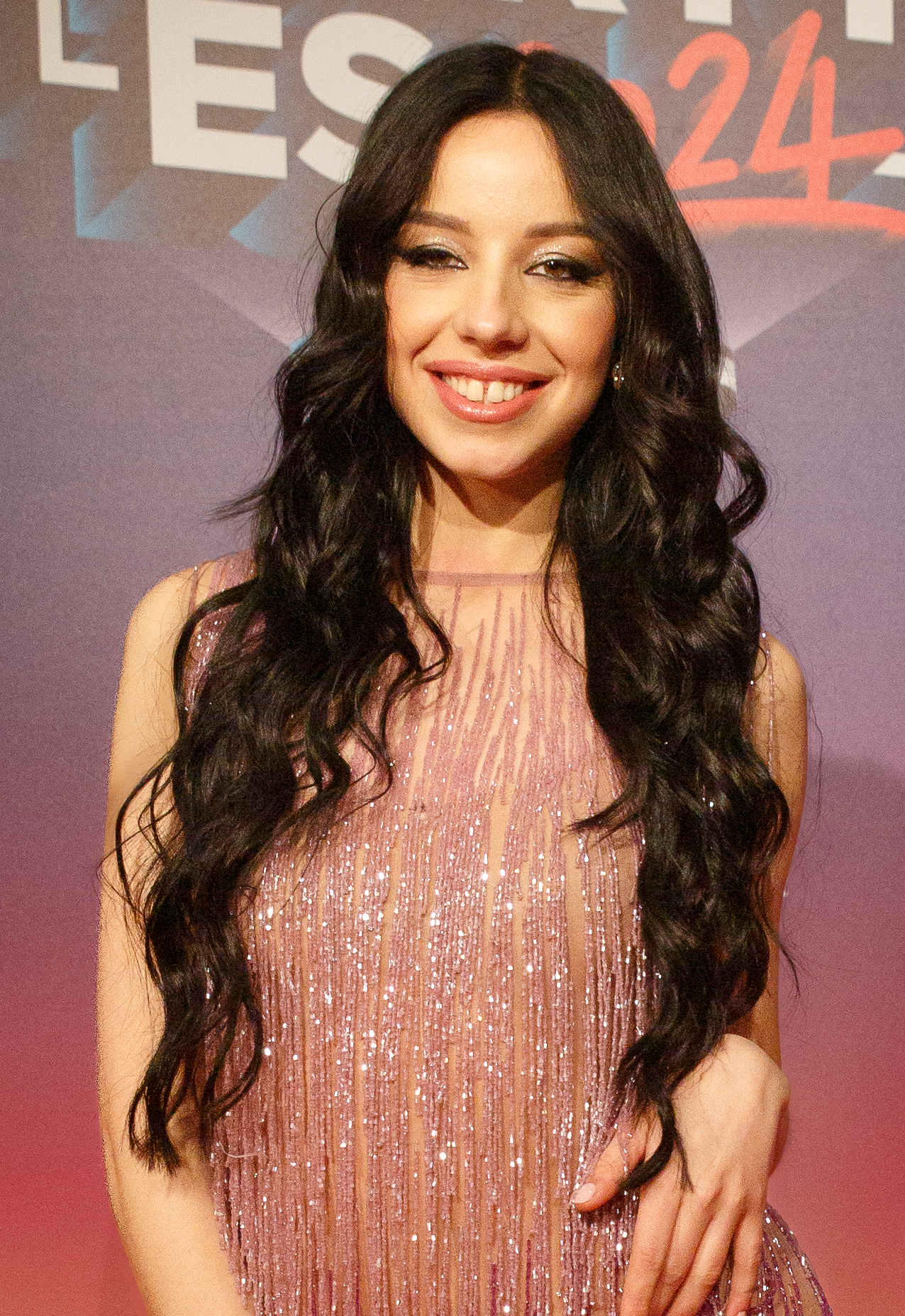
Sarah Bonnici (2025)

Aleandro Spiteri Monsigneur (2026–)

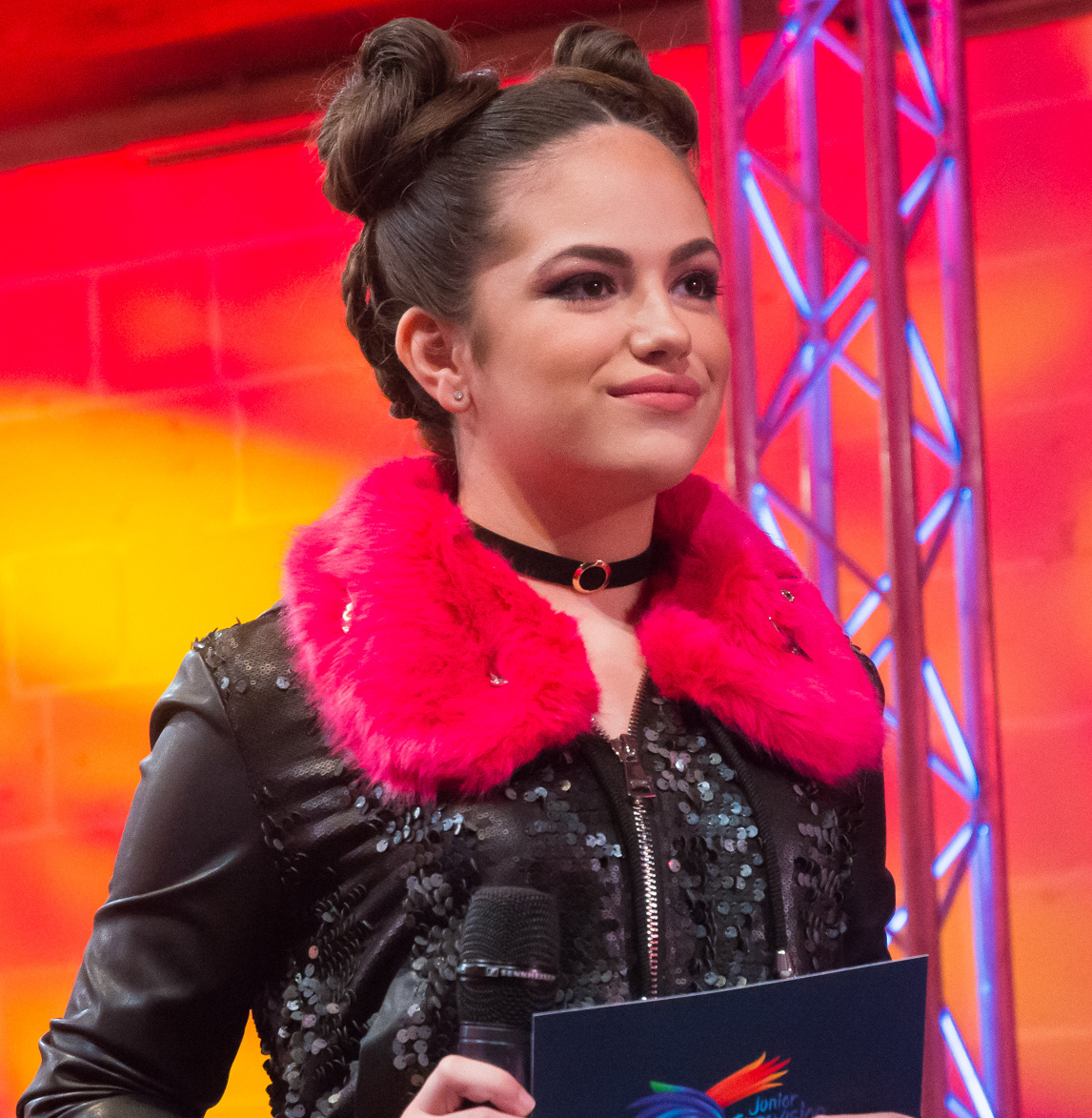
Gaia Cauchi (2026–)

=== Lineup of coaches ===
Coaches' line-up by chairs order
Season	Year	Coaches		
Season	Year	1	2	3
1	2022–23	Owen	Destiny	Gianluca
2	2025	Gianluca	Destiny	Sarah
3	2026	Aleandro	Destiny	Gaia

== Presenters ==
The Voice Kids presenters
Presenter	Seasons		
Presenter	1	2	3
Sarah Bajada			
Maxine Pace			

== Coaches and finalists ==
Winner
Runners-up

- Winners are in bold, the finalists that went in the televoting are in italicized font, and the eliminated artists are in small font.

Season	Coaches and their finalists		
1	Owen Leuellen	Destiny Chukunyere	Gianluca Bezzina
1	**Dawn Desira**; Max Borg	Yulan Law; Eliża Stellini	Luigi Manna; Mireille McKay
2	Gianluca Bezzina	Destiny Chukunyere	Sarah Bonnici
2	Rachele Maria Nistica; Oliver Zammit Attard	**Eliza Borg**; Marie Emeh Camilleri	Carly Cachia Arpa; Mia Lanzon
3	Aleandro Spiteri Monsigneur	Destiny Chukunyere	Gaia Cauchi
3	Maya Galea; Annis Joy Buttigieg	Zeah Aquilina; Alaiya Cini	**Beppe Caruana**; Nina Grima Wood

== Series overview ==
Warning: the following table presents a significant amount of different colors.

Teams color key
Artist from Team Gianluca	Artist from Team Sarah
Artist from Team Owen	Artist from Team Aleandro
Artist from Team Destiny	Artist from Team Gaia

Maltese The Voice Kids series overview
Season	Aired	Winner	Other finalists		Winning coach	Presenter
1	2022-23	Dawn Desira	Luigi Manna	Yulan Law	Owen Leuellen	Sarah Bajada
2	2025	Eliza Borg	Carly Cachia Arpa	Rachele Maria Nistica	Destiny Chukunyere	Maxine Pace
3	2026	Beppe Caruana	Maya Galea	Zeah Aquilina	Gaia Cauchi	Maxine Pace

== Seasons' synopsis ==
Winner
Runners-up
Eliminated in the Live Finals
Eliminated in the Sing-offs
Stolen in the Battles
Eliminated in the Battles

=== Season 1 (2022-23) ===
The first season of The Voice Kids premiered on 7 October 2022 and ended on 6 January 2023 on TVM. The coaches were Gianluca Bezzina, Destiny Chukunyere and Owen Leuellen. The inaugural season was hosted by Sarah Bajada. The winner was Dawn Desira from Team Owen.

Coaches	Top 45 Artists				
Owen Leuellen					
Owen Leuellen	Dawn	Max	Amira	Anneka	Zia
Owen Leuellen	Donatella	Ella	Ella	Frazer	Kacy
Owen Leuellen	Kayleen	Maria	Matthias	Natalia	Rihanna
Destiny Chukunyere					
Destiny Chukunyere	Yulan	Eliża	Filippo	Marcus	Mia
Destiny Chukunyere	Carly	Ella	Faith	Hailey	Ilona
Destiny Chukunyere	Krista	Kylie Ann	Leah	Mia	Sara
Gianluca Bezzina					
Gianluca Bezzina	Luigi	Mireille	Andrea	Benjamin	Elisa
Gianluca Bezzina	Cassidy	Cesca	Chloe	Ellie	Francesca
Gianluca Bezzina	Jayden	Kiera	Leah	Michael Joseph	Shaznay

=== Season 2 (2025) ===
The second season of The Voice Kids premiered on 29 September and ended on 18 October 2025 on TVM. Gianluca Bezzina, Destiny Chukunyere returned for their second season as coaches. Sarah Bonnici completed the panel, replacing Owen Leuellen. Maxine Pace debuted as the new host, replacing Sarah Bajada.

The winner of the season was selected to represent Malta at the Junior Eurovision Song Contest 2025. The winner was Eliza Borg from Team Destiny.

Coaches	Top 20 Artists			
Gianluca Bezzina				
Gianluca Bezzina	Rachele Maria Nistica	Oliver Zammit	Aidan Borg	~~Mia Lanzon~~
Gianluca Bezzina	Izaya Schembri	Khloe Chircop	Mia Mifsud	Natalia Xerri
Destiny Chukunyere				
Destiny Chukunyere	Eliza Borg	Marie Emeh Camilleri	Alaiya Cini	~~Rachele Maria Nistica~~
Destiny Chukunyere	Chanel Abela Camilleri	Eleny Incorvaja Scerri	Kaylin Camilleri	
Sarah Bonnici				
Sarah Bonnici	Carly Cachia Arpa	Mia Lanzon	Skye Gilson	~~Alaiya Cini~~
Sarah Bonnici	Emma Bonnici	Esme Camilleri Gravina	Julia Sammut	Naielle Formosa Cumbo
Note: Italicized names are artists stolen from another team during the battles (names struck through within former teams).

=== Season 3 (2026) ===
The third season of The Voice Kids premiered on 7 September 2026 on TVM. Destiny Chukunyere returned for her third season as a coach and was joined by new coaches Aleandro Spiteri Monsigneur and Gaia Cauchi. Maxine Pace returned as the host.

The winner of the season was selected to represent Malta at the Junior Eurovision Song Contest 2026.The winner was Beppe Caruana from Team Gaia.

Coaches	Top 27 Artists				
Aleandro Spiteri Monsigneur					
Aleandro Spiteri Monsigneur	Maya Galea	Annis Joy Buttigieg	Emma Farrugia	Chiara Luisa Magrin	~~Aidan Borg~~
Aleandro Spiteri Monsigneur	Amber Carabott	Esme Camilleri Gravina	Katryce Grixti	Nelly Zerafa	Rihanna Cutajar
Destiny Chukunyere					
Destiny Chukunyere	Zeah Aquilina	Alaiya Cini	Naya Catania	Skye Gilson	~~Annis Joy Buttigieg~~
Destiny Chukunyere	Aidem Galea	Elena Spagnol	Ella Tonna	Matthias Cutajar	Roan Pirotta
Gaia Cauchi					
Gaia Cauchi	Beppe Caruana	Nina Grima Wood	Aidan Borg	Zelenio Zarb	~~Naya Catania~~
Gaia Cauchi	Julia Sammut	Kaylin Camilleri	Kristina Pace	Leah Gauci	Mia Castagna
Note: Italicized names are artists stolen from another team during the battles (names struck through within former teams).
