= The Voice Kids (Maltese TV series) season 3 =

The Voice Kids
- Season 3
- Hosted by: Maxine Pace
- Coaches: Aleandro Spiteri Monsigneur; Destiny Chukunyere; Gaia Cauchi
- No. of contestants: 27 artists
- Winner: Beppe Caruana
- Winning coach: Gaia Cauchi
- Runners-up: Maya Galea; Zeah Aquilina

Release
- Original network: TVM
- Original release: September 7 – September 19, 2026

Season chronology
- ← Previous; Season 2

The third edition of the Maltese singing competition The Voice Kids is airing from September 7 to 19, 2026 on TVM. Shortly prior to the season airing, the panel was confirmed to be formed by Destiny Chukunyere, who returned for her third consecutive season, in addition to the entry of Aleandro Spiteri Monsigneur and Gaia Cauchi, who replaced exiting coaches Gianluca Bezzina and Sarah Bonnici. Additionally, Maxine Pace returned for her second consecutive season as host.

The winner of the show was the eleven-year-old Beppe Caruana from Team Gaia, who was also selected to represent Malta in the Junior Eurovision Song Contest 2026.

== Production ==
Following the European Broadcasting Union's confirmation that Malta would host the Junior Eurovision Song Contest 2026, the Maltese broadcaster Public Broadcasting Services (PBS) announced that The Voice Kids would be used to select the national entry for the second year in the row.

Coaches of The Voice Kids Malta Season 3

Aleandro Spiteri Monsigneur

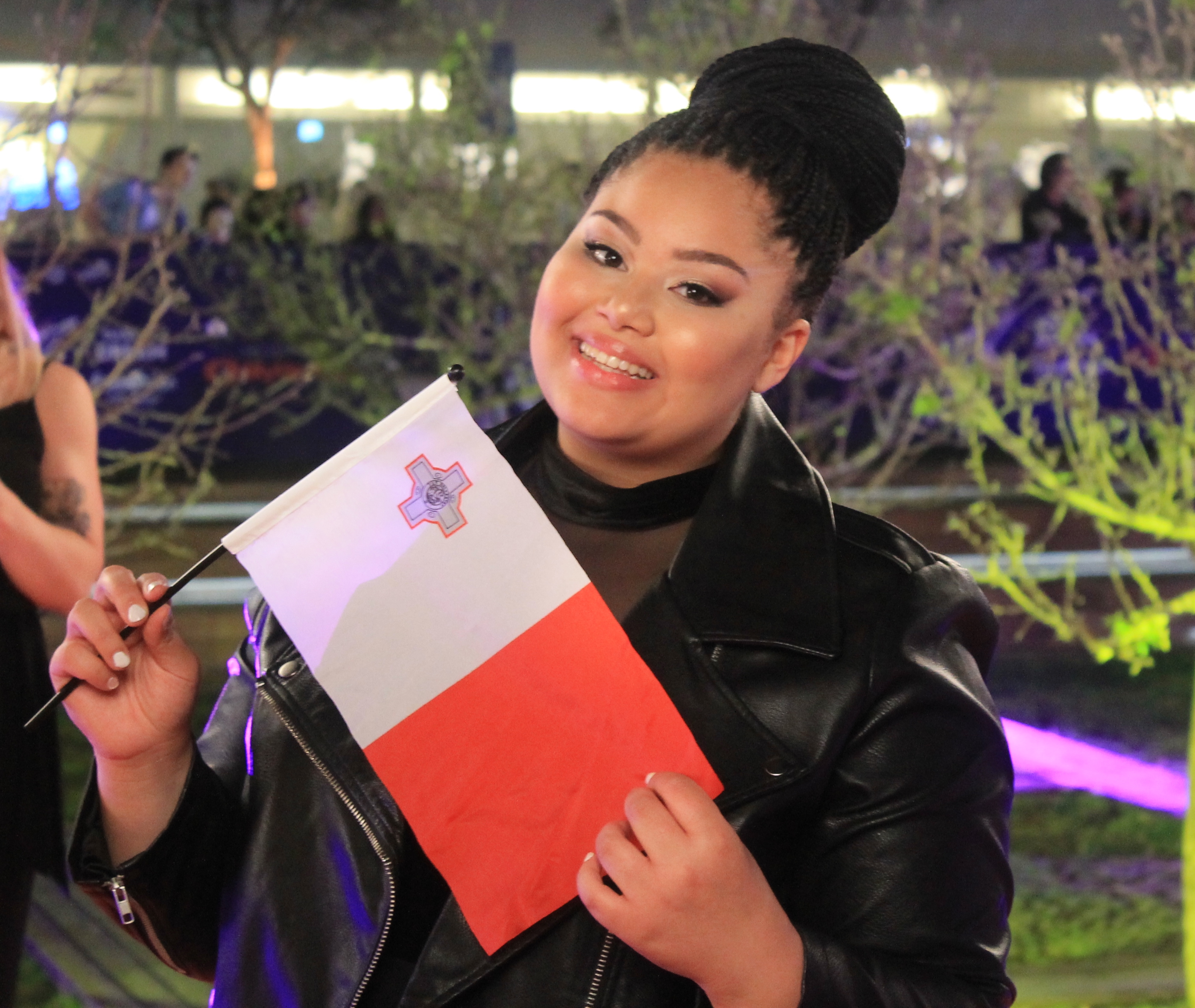
Destiny Chukunyere

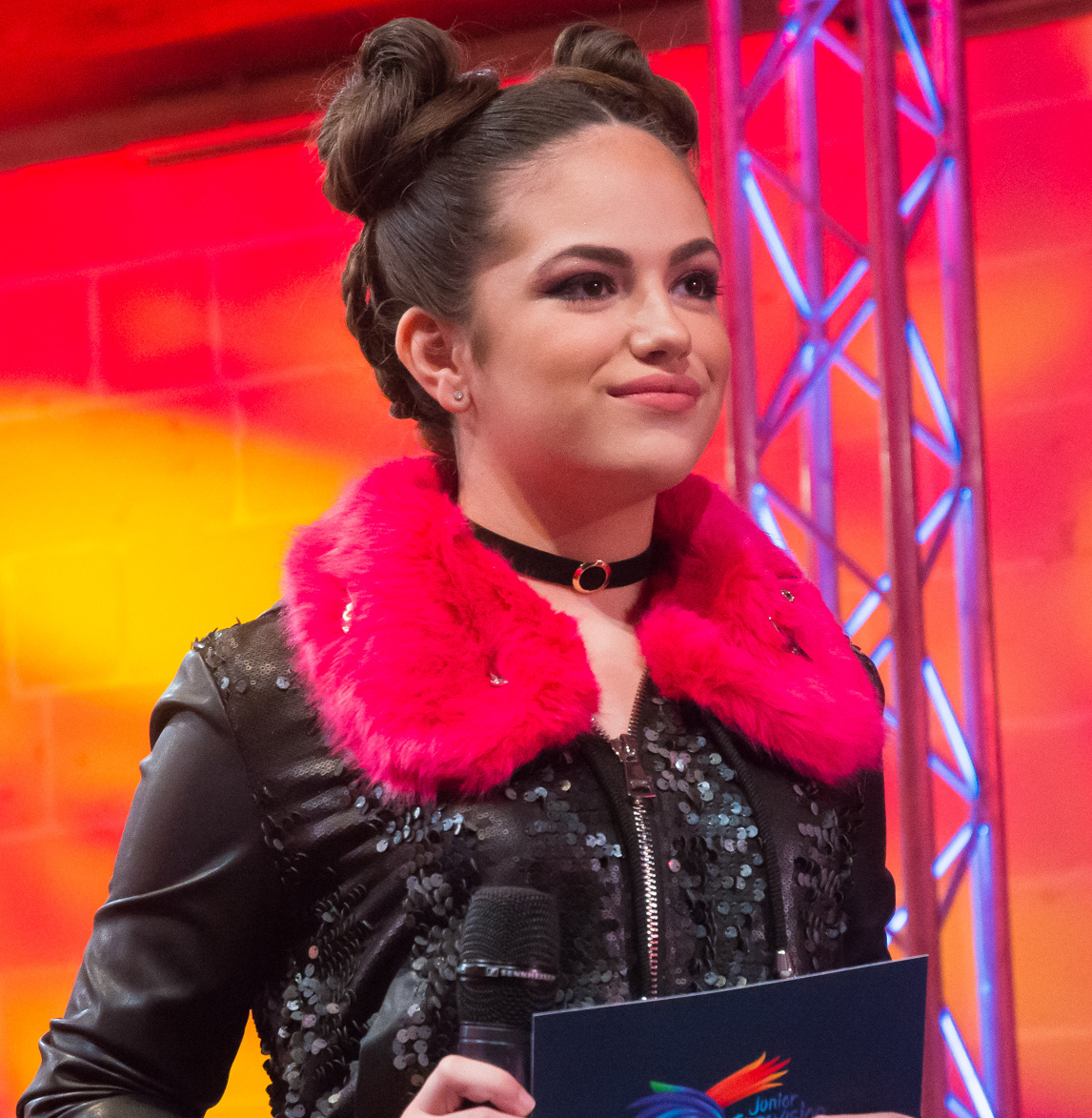
Gaia Cauchi

=== Coaches ===
It was confirmed shortly after that Destiny Chukunyere would return for her third season on the show. Gianluca Bezzina and Sarah Bonnici, on the other hand, have both exited the panel this season and were replaced by coaches Aleandro Spiteri Monsigneur and Gaia Cauchi, the latter being the winner of the Junior Eurovision Song Contest 2013.

== Teams ==
Colour key

- Winner
- Runner-up
- Eliminated in the Final
- Eliminated in the Sing-offs
- Stolen by another coach in the Battles
- Eliminated in the Battle rounds

Coaches	Top 27 Artists				
Aleandro Spiteri Monsigneur					
Aleandro Spiteri Monsigneur	Maya Galea	Annis Joy Buttigieg	Chiara Luisa Magrin	Emma Farrugia	~~Aidan Borg~~
Aleandro Spiteri Monsigneur	Amber Carabott	Esme Camilleri Gravina	Katryce Grixti	Nelly Zerafa	Rihanna Cutajar
Destiny Chukunyere					
Destiny Chukunyere	Zeah Aquilina	Alaiya Cini	Naya Catania	Skye Gilson	~~Annis Joy Buttigieg~~
Destiny Chukunyere	Aidem Galea	Elena Spagnol	Ella Tonna	Matthias Cutajar	Roan Pirotta
Gaia Cauchi					
Gaia Cauchi	Beppe Caruana	Nina Grima Wood	Aidan Borg	Zelenio Zarb	~~Naya Catania~~
Gaia Cauchi	Julia Sammut	Kaylin Camilleri	Kristina Pace	Leah Gauci	Mia Castagna
Note: Italicized names are artists stolen from another team during the battles (names struck through within former teams).

== Blind auditions ==
The season begins with the Blind Auditions on September 7, 2026. During this stage, artists perform while the coaches' chairs are turned away from the stage. If a coach is interested, they press their button to turn around. When only one coach turns, the artist automatically joins their team; if multiple coaches turn, the artist gets to choose.

Key

✔	Coach pressed "I WANT YOU" button
	Artist defaulted to this coach's team
	Artist picked a coach's team
	Artist eliminated with no coach pressing their "I WANT YOU" button

Blind auditions results
Episode	Order	Artist	Age	Hometown	Song	Coach's and contestant's choices		
Episode	Order	Artist	Age	Hometown	Song	Aleandro	Destiny	Gaia
Episode 1 (September 7, 2026)	1	Nina Grima Wood	12	Lija	"The Visitor"	✔	✔	✔
Episode 1 (September 7, 2026)	2	Slavin Col Schembri	12	Siġġiewi	"Grenade"	—	—	—
Episode 1 (September 7, 2026)	3	Skye Gilson	11	Paola	"Mamma Knows Best"	✔	✔	✔
Episode 1 (September 7, 2026)	4	Emma Farrugia	14	Żurrieq	"Secret Love Song, Part II"	✔	✔	✔
Episode 1 (September 7, 2026)	5	Martina Micallef	10	Pembroke	"No One"	—	—	—
Episode 1 (September 7, 2026)	6	Roan Pirotta	13	Iklin	"New Day Will Rise"	—	✔	—
Episode 1 (September 7, 2026)	7	Leona Debono	10	Cospicua	"I See Red"	—	—	—
Episode 1 (September 7, 2026)	8	Beppe Caruana	11	Żabbar	"Space Man"	—	—	✔
Episode 2 (September 8, 2026)	1	Maya Galea	12	Rabat	"Material Lover"	✔	—	✔
Episode 2 (September 8, 2026)	2	Elena Spagnol	14	Attard	"The Cure"	—	✔	—
Episode 2 (September 8, 2026)	3	Julia Sammut	14	Fgura	"The One That Got Away"	—	✔	✔
Episode 2 (September 8, 2026)	4	Eleny Incorvaja Scerri	14	Birkirkara	"A Moment Like This"	—	—	—
Episode 2 (September 8, 2026)	5	Aidem Galea	13	Marsaxlokk	"All I Want"	—	✔	—
Episode 2 (September 8, 2026)	6	Leah Gauci	14	Gudja	"Listen"	—	—	✔
Episode 2 (September 8, 2026)	7	Zelenio Zarb	12	Birkirkara	"Skinny Love"	✔	✔	✔
Episode 2 (September 8, 2026)	8	Faye Sultana Loporto	13	Swieqi	"Falling"	—	—	—
Episode 2 (September 8, 2026)	9	Annis Joy Buttigieg	14	Mosta	"Brave"	✔	✔	—
Episode 3 (September 9, 2026)	1	Naya Catania	9	Birkirkara	"Rolling in the Deep"	✔	—	✔
Episode 3 (September 9, 2026)	2	Katryce Grixti	13	Żurrieq	"Dream Police"	✔	✔	✔
Episode 3 (September 9, 2026)	3	Aidan Borg	12	Kalkara	"Survive"	✔	✔	✔
Episode 3 (September 9, 2026)	4	Illona Mercieca	12	Xgħajra	"Wildflower"	—	—	—
Episode 3 (September 9, 2026)	5	Matthias Cutajar	12	Msida	"Fever Dream"	—	✔	✔
Episode 3 (September 9, 2026)	6	Kaylin Camilleri	14	Sliema	"Lovin' You"	—	—	✔
Episode 3 (September 9, 2026)	7	Amy Calleja	14	Fgura	"Tightrope"	—	—	—
Episode 3 (September 9, 2026)	8	Nelly Zerafa	11	Qormi	"Die on This Hill"	✔	—	—
Episode 3 (September 9, 2026)	9	Amber Carabott	14	Żurrieq	"Hopelessly Devoted to You"	✔	—	—
Episode 4 (September 10, 2026)	1	Chiara Luisa Magrin	13	Swatar	"S.O.S"	✔	✔	✔
Episode 4 (September 10, 2026)	2	Zeah Aquilina	13	Tarxien	"All I Ask"	✔	✔	✔
Episode 4 (September 10, 2026)	3	Laura Bugeja	14	Marsaskala	"I'm with You"	—	—	—
Episode 4 (September 10, 2026)	4	Alaiya Cini	13	Marsaskala	"Cuz I Love You"	✔	✔	✔
Episode 4 (September 10, 2026)	5	Rihanna Cutajar	11	Gudja	"Clown"	✔	—	—
Episode 4 (September 10, 2026)	6	Zaya Darmanin	13	Birkirkara	"Sign of the Times"	—	—	—
Episode 4 (September 10, 2026)	7	Ella Tonna	11	Marsaskala	"Somebody to Love"	—	✔	—
Episode 4 (September 10, 2026)	8	Kristina Pace	14	Qrendi	"Strange Birds"	—	—	✔
Episode 4 (September 10, 2026)	9	Esme Camilleri Gravina	14	Żejtun	"What's Up?"	✔	—	—
Episode 4 (September 10, 2026)	10	Mia Castagna	13	San Ġwann	"Come to Your Senses"	—	—	✔

== Battles ==
The second stage of the show, the battles, aired from September 12, 2026 through September 15, 2026, comprising episodes 5 through 7. In this round, the coaches pitted three of their artists in a singing match and then select one of them to advance to the next round.

Losing artists may be "stolen" by another coach, becoming new members of their team. Each coach has one steal. At the end of this round, four artists remained on each team; three were the battle winners, while the other one was stolen from another coach. In total, 12 artists advanced to the Sing-Offs.

Key

Artist won the Battle and advanced to the Sing-offs
Artist lost the Battle but was stolen by another coach and advanced to the Sing-offs
Artist lost the Battle and was eliminated

Battles results
Episode	Coach	Order	Winner	Song	Losers	Steal result		
Episode	Coach	Order	Winner	Song	Losers	Aleandro	Destiny	Gaia
Episode 5 (September 12, 2026)	Destiny	1	Skye Gilson	"A Million Dreams"	Aidem Galea	—	N/A	—
Episode 5 (September 12, 2026)	Destiny	1	Skye Gilson	"A Million Dreams"	Roan Pirotta	—	N/A	—
Episode 5 (September 12, 2026)	Destiny	2	Zeah Aquilina	"Man in the Mirror"	Annis Joy Buttigieg	✔	N/A	—
Episode 5 (September 12, 2026)	Destiny	2	Zeah Aquilina	"Man in the Mirror"	Elena Spagnol	Team full	N/A	—
Episode 5 (September 12, 2026)	Destiny	3	Alaiya Cini	"Walking on Sunshine"	Matthias Cutajar	Team full	N/A	—
Episode 5 (September 12, 2026)	Destiny	3	Alaiya Cini	"Walking on Sunshine"	Ella Tonna	Team full	N/A	—
Episode 6 (September 14, 2026)	Aleandro	1	Maya Galea	"Man I Need"	Amber Carabott	Team full	—	—
Episode 6 (September 14, 2026)	Aleandro	1	Maya Galea	"Man I Need"	Katryce Grixti	Team full	—	—
Episode 6 (September 14, 2026)	Aleandro	2	Emma Farrugia	"I Want You Back"	Aidan Borg	Team full	—	✔
Episode 6 (September 14, 2026)	Aleandro	2	Emma Farrugia	"I Want You Back"	Nelly Zerafa	Team full	—	Team full
Episode 6 (September 14, 2026)	Aleandro	3	Chiara Luisa Magrin	"Die with a Smile"	Rihanna Cutajar	Team full	—	Team full
Episode 6 (September 14, 2026)	Aleandro	3	Chiara Luisa Magrin	"Die with a Smile"	Esme Camilleri Gravina	Team full	—	Team full
Episode 7 (September 15, 2026)	Gaia	1	Nina Grima Wood	"Wrecking Ball"	Kristina Pace	Team full	—	Team full
Episode 7 (September 15, 2026)	Gaia	1	Nina Grima Wood	"Wrecking Ball"	Leah Gauci	Team full	—	Team full
Episode 7 (September 15, 2026)	Gaia	2	Zelenio Zarb	"True Colors"	Kaylin Camilleri	Team full	—	Team full
Episode 7 (September 15, 2026)	Gaia	2	Zelenio Zarb	"True Colors"	Mia Castagna	Team full	—	Team full
Episode 7 (September 15, 2026)	Gaia	3	Beppe Caruana	"Just Give Me a Reason"	Julia Sammut	Team full	—	Team full
Episode 7 (September 15, 2026)	Gaia	3	Beppe Caruana	"Just Give Me a Reason"	Naya Catania	Team full	✔	Team full

== Sing-offs ==
The third stage of the show, the sing-offs, aired from September 16, 2026 through September 18, 2026, comprising episodes 8 through 10. In this round, the coaches assign a song to every artist of their team and then select two of them to advance to the Live Finals.

Artist was chosen by their coach and advanced to the Live Finals
Artist was eliminated

Sing-offs results
Episode	Coach	Order	Artist	Song	Result
Episode 8 (September 16, 2026)	Destiny	1	Skye Gilson	"Golden"	Eliminated
Episode 8 (September 16, 2026)	Destiny	2	Alaiya Cini	"Anyone"	Advanced
Episode 8 (September 16, 2026)	Destiny	3	Zeah Aquilina	"My Heart Will Go On"	Advanced
Episode 8 (September 16, 2026)	Destiny	4	Naya Catania	"Proud Mary"	Eliminated
Episode 9 (September 17, 2026)	Aleandro	1	Maya Galea	"Creep"	Advanced
Episode 9 (September 17, 2026)	Aleandro	2	Emma Farrugia	"Heart of Glass"	Eliminated
Episode 9 (September 17, 2026)	Aleandro	3	Chiara Luisa Magrin	"Wasted Love"	Eliminated
Episode 9 (September 17, 2026)	Aleandro	4	Annis Joy Buttigieg	"Bust Your Windows"	Advanced
Episode 10 (September 18, 2026)	Gaia	1	Beppe Caruana	"You Are the Reason"	Advanced
Episode 10 (September 18, 2026)	Gaia	2	Zelenio Zarb	"Risk It All"	Eliminated
Episode 10 (September 18, 2026)	Gaia	3	Aidan Borg	"When I Was Your Man"	Eliminated
Episode 10 (September 18, 2026)	Gaia	4	Nina Grima Wood	"Oscar Winning Tears"	Advanced

== Live Finals ==
The final, which aired on September 19, 2026, consisted of two rounds. In the first round, the 6 finalists (2 per team) perform the song they sang during the Blind Auditions. In the second round, the three superfinalists selected by the coaches will perform a duet with their respective coaches.

Unlike in previous seasons, the winner of the third season of The Voice Kids was determined by a jury vote.

=== First round ===
Artist was chosen by their coach and advanced to Round 2
Artist was eliminated

Live Finals results
Episode	Coach	Order	Artist	Song	Result
Episode 11 (September 19, 2026)	Gaia Cauchi	1	Beppe Caruana	"Space Man"	Advanced
Episode 11 (September 19, 2026)	Destiny Chukunyere	2	Alaiya Cini	"Cuz I Love You"	Eliminated
Episode 11 (September 19, 2026)	Aleandro Spiteri Monsigneur	3	Annis Joy Buttigieg	"Brave"	Eliminated
Episode 11 (September 19, 2026)	Gaia Cauchi	4	Nina Grima Wood	"The Visitor"	Eliminated
Episode 11 (September 19, 2026)	Destiny Chukunyere	5	Zeah Aquilina	"All I Ask"	Advanced
Episode 11 (September 19, 2026)	Aleandro Spiteri Monsigneur	6	Maya Galea	"Material Lover"	Advanced

=== Second round ===
Winner
Finalists

Episode	Coach	Artist	Order	Song (Duet with the coach)	Order	Song	Result
Episode 11 (September 19, 2026)	Aleandro Spiteri Monsigneur	Maya Galea	1	"Somewhere Only We Know"	4	"I Don't Want to Miss a Thing"	Finalist
Episode 11 (September 19, 2026)	Gaia Cauchi	Beppe Caruana	2	"Mad World"	5	"Beautiful Things"	Winner
Episode 11 (September 19, 2026)	Destiny Chukunyere	Zeah Aquilina	3	"The Climb"	6	"I Wanna Dance with Somebody"	Finalist
