= The Voice Kids (Maltese TV series) season 2 =

The Voice Kids
- Season 2
- Hosted by: Maxine Pace
- Coaches: Gianluca Bezzina; Destiny Chukunyere; Sarah Bonnici
- No. of contestants: 20 artists
- Winner: Eliza Borg
- Winning coach: Destiny Chukunyere
- Runners-up: Carly Cachia Arpa; Rachele Maria Nistica

Release
- Original network: TVM
- Original release: September 29 – October 18, 2025

Season chronology
- Next → Season 3

The second edition of The Voice Kids premiered from 29 September to 18 October 2025 on TVM, for sixteen episodes with the hosting of Maxine Pace, replaced Sarah Bajada as the host. New in this edition, in addition to the entry of the new coach Sarah Bonnici, who replaced Owen Leuellen, while Gianluca Bezzina and Destiny Chukunyere returned.

The winner of the show was the twelve-year-old Eliza Borg from Team Destiny, who was also selected to represent Malta in the Junior Eurovision Song Contest 2025.

== Coaches ==
The coaches of the second season of The Voice Kids were Gianluca Bezzina and Destiny Chukunyere, who returned for their second seasons. Alongside them Sarah Bonnici debuted.

Coaches of The Voice Kids Malta Season 2

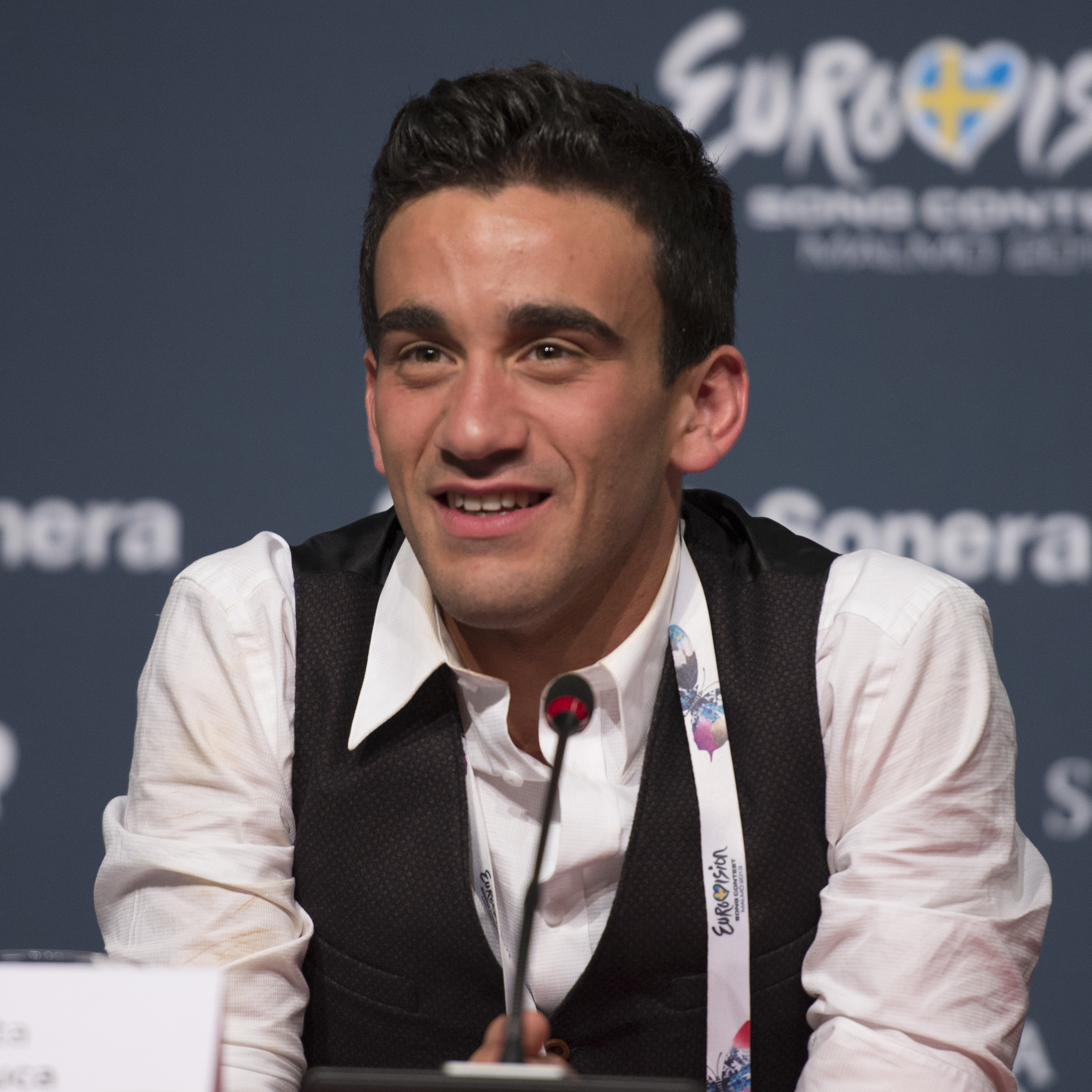
Gianluca Bezzina

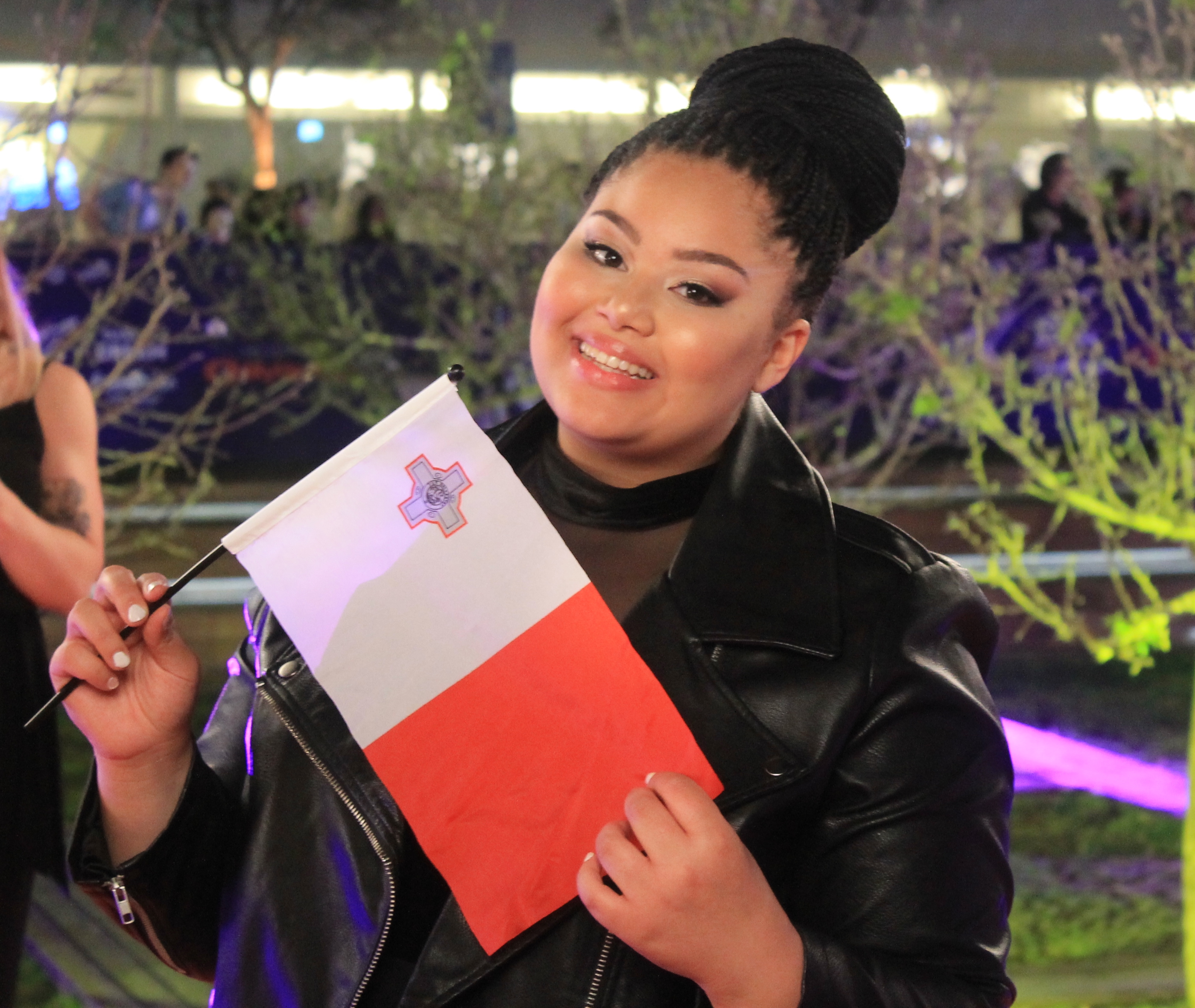
Destiny Chukunyere

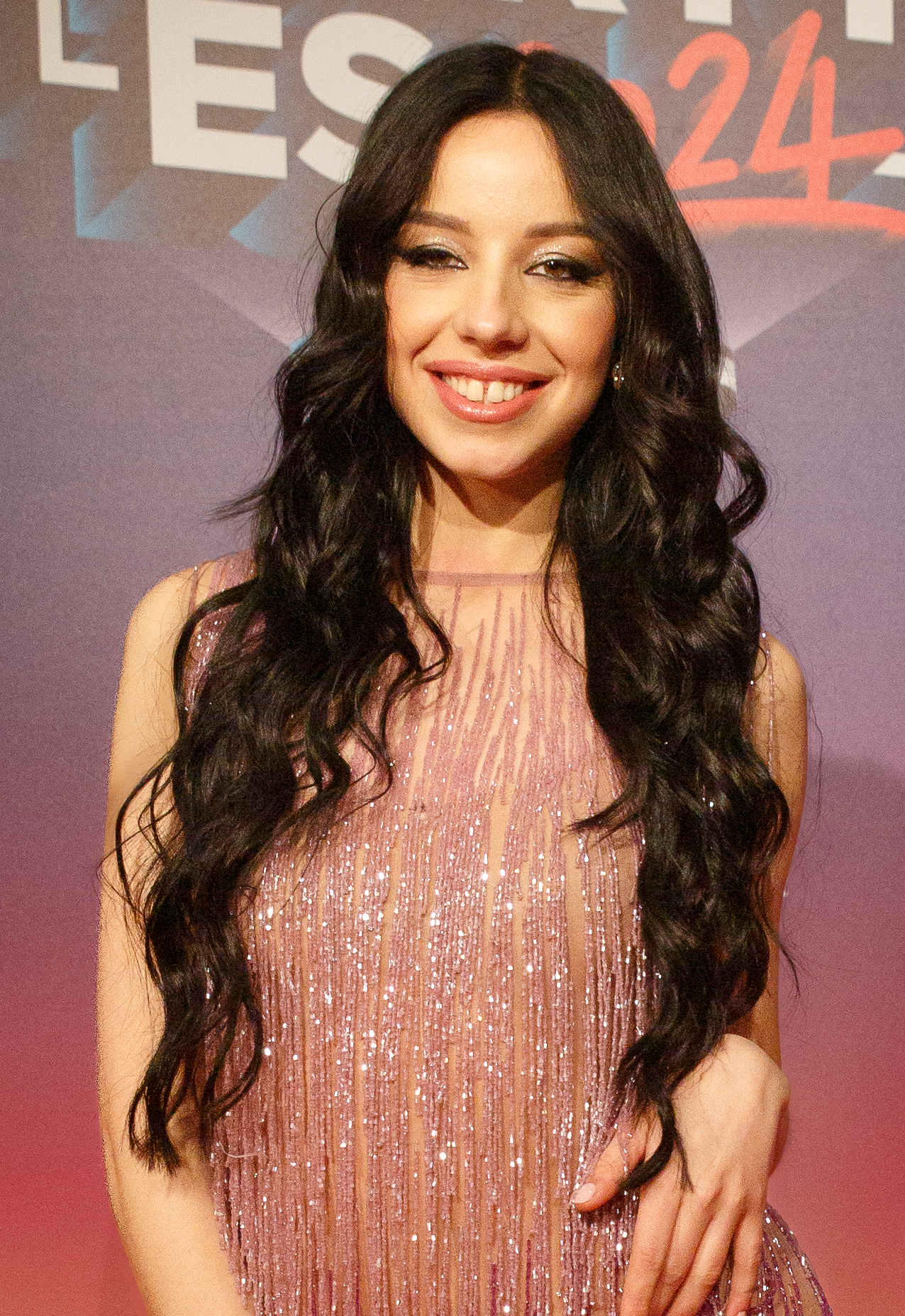
Sarah Bonnici

== Teams ==
Colour key

- Winner
- Runner-up
- Eliminated in the Final
- Eliminated in the Sing-offs
- Stolen by another coach in the Battles
- Eliminated in the Battle rounds

Coaches	Top 20 Artists			
Gianluca Bezzina				
Gianluca Bezzina	Rachele Maria Nistica	Oliver Zammit Attard	Aidan Borg	~~Mia Lanzon~~
Gianluca Bezzina	Izaya Schembri	Khloe Chircop	Mia Mifsud	Natalia Xerri
Destiny Chukunyere				
Destiny Chukunyere	Eliza Borg	Marie Emeh Camilleri	Alaiya Cini	~~Rachele Maria Nistica~~
Destiny Chukunyere	Chanel Abela Camilleri	Eleny Incorvaja Scerri	Kaylin Camilleri	
Sarah Bonnici				
Sarah Bonnici	Carly Cachia Arpa	Mia Lanzon	Skye Gilson	~~Alaiya Cini~~
Sarah Bonnici	Emma Bonnici	Esme Camilleri Gravina	Julia Sammut	Naielle Formosa Cumbo
Note: Italicized names are artists stolen from another team during the battles (names struck through within former teams).

== Blind auditions ==
The season begins with the Blind Auditions on September 29, 2025. During this stage, artists perform while the coaches' chairs are turned away from the stage. If a coach is interested, they press their button to turn around. When only one coach turns, the artist automatically joins their team; if multiple coaches turn, the artist gets to choose.

Key

✔	Coach pressed "I WANT YOU" button
	Artist defaulted to this coach's team
	Artist picked a coach's team
	Artist eliminated with no coach pressing their "I WANT YOU" button

Blind auditions results
Episode	Order	Artist	Age	Hometown	Song	Coach's and contestant's choices		
Episode	Order	Artist	Age	Hometown	Song	Gianluca	Destiny	Sarah
Episode 1 (September 29, 2025)	1	Carly Cachia Arpa	12	Mġarr	"Creep"	✔	✔	✔
Episode 1 (September 29, 2025)	2	Aidem Galea	12	Marsaxlokk	"You Are The Reason"	—	—	—
Episode 1 (September 29, 2025)	3	Kathleen Marie Micallef	14	Mġarr	"Strange"	—	—	—
Episode 2 (September 30, 2025)
Episode 2 (September 30, 2025)	1	Francesca Galea	11	Tarxien	"Tell Me Why"	—	—	—
Episode 2 (September 30, 2025)	2	Eleny Incorvaja Scerri	13	Birkirkara	"I Can't Let Go"	—	✔	—
Episode 2 (September 30, 2025)	3	Joy Xerri	14	Għasri	"Skyfall"	—	—	—
Episode 2 (September 30, 2025)	4	Khloe Chircop	14	Għaxaq	"Shallow"	✔	—	—
Episode 3 (October 1, 2025)
Episode 3 (October 1, 2025)	1	Aidan Borg	11	Kalkara	"Momma Song"	✔	✔	—
Episode 3 (October 1, 2025)	2	Kaylin Camilleri	13	Sliema	"The Code"	—	✔	—
Episode 3 (October 1, 2025)	3	Rachele Maria Nistica	13	Calabria, Italy	"My Way"	—	✔	—
Episode 3 (October 1, 2025)	4	Emma Bonnici	14	Żejtun	"I Love You"	—	—	✔
Episode 4 (October 2, 2025)
Episode 4 (October 2, 2025)	1	Esme Camilleri Gravina	13	Żejtun	"Zombie"	✔	—	✔
Episode 4 (October 2, 2025)	2	Keira Sciberras	12	Hamrun	"Stop!"	—	—	—
Episode 4 (October 2, 2025)	3	Izaya Schembri	14	Birkirkara	"Photograph"	✔	—	—
Episode 4 (October 2, 2025)	4	Zeah Aquilina	12	Birgu	"Purple Rain"	—	—	—
Episode 5 (October 3, 2025)
Episode 5 (October 3, 2025)	1	Lenah Muscat	11	Zurrieq	"Lost on You"	—	—	—
Episode 5 (October 3, 2025)	2	Ilona Mercieca	11	Xagħra	"Into The Unknown"	—	—	—
Episode 5 (October 3, 2025)	3	Chanel Mifsud	14	Hamrun	"The Greatest"	—	—	—
Episode 5 (October 3, 2025)	4	Eliza Borg	12	Naxxar	"Clown"	✔	✔	✔
Episode 6 (October 6, 2025)
Episode 6 (October 6, 2025)	1	Oliver Zammit Attard	12	St. Julian's	"Fought & Lost"	✔	—	✔
Episode 6 (October 6, 2025)	2	Ella Bonanno Cesare	12	Mosta	"Paris (Ooh La La)"	—	—	—
Episode 6 (October 6, 2025)	3	Elena Spagnol	13	Attard	"Snow Angel"	—	—	—
Episode 6 (October 6, 2025)	4	Natalia Xerri	13	Żabbar	"Sweet Child O'Mine"	✔	—	✔
Episode 7 (October 7, 2025)
Episode 7 (October 7, 2025)	1	Julia Mallia	12	Birkirkara	"Tomorrow"	—	—	—
Episode 7 (October 7, 2025)	2	Julia Sammut	13	Qormi	"Drivers License"	—	—	✔
Episode 7 (October 7, 2025)	3	Elisa Polidano	11	Mġarr	"Never Enough"	—	—	—
Episode 7 (October 7, 2025)	4	Marie Emeh Camilleri	12	Nadur	"Listen"	✔	✔	✔
Episode 8 (October 8, 2025)
Episode 8 (October 8, 2025)	1	Mia Lanzon	14	Msida	"You Don't Own Me"	✔	—	—
Episode 8 (October 8, 2025)	2	Naielle Formosa Cumbo	12	Valetta	"Wildflower"	—	✔	✔
Episode 8 (October 8, 2025)	3	Chanel Abela Camilleri	11	Birżebbuġa	"One Night Only"	—	✔	—
Episode 8 (October 8, 2025)	4	Skye Gilson	10	Paola	"What Was I Made For"	✔	—	✔
Episode 9 (October 9, 2025)
Episode 9 (October 9, 2025)	1	Mia Mifsud	13	Hamrun	"Deja Vu"	✔	—	—
Episode 9 (October 9, 2025)	2	Norah Anand	11	Santa Venera	"Stand Up"	—	—	—
Episode 9 (October 9, 2025)	3	Ylenia Gugliotta	12	Tarxien	"Piece by Piece"	—	—	—
Episode 9 (October 9, 2025)	4	Alaiya Cini	12	Marsaskala	"Mamma Knows Best"	—	✔	✔

== Battles ==
The second stage of the show, the battles, aired from October 10, 2025 through October 14, 2025, comprising episodes 10 through 12. In this round, the coaches pitted three/four of their artists in a singing match and then select one of them to advance to the next round.

Losing artists may be "stolen" by another coach, becoming new members of their team. Each coach has one steal. At the end of this round, three artists remained on each team; two were the battle winners, while the other one was stolen from another coach. In total, 9 artists advanced to the Sing-Offs.

Key

Artist won the Battle and advanced to the Sing-offs
Artist lost the Battle but was stolen by another coach and advanced to the Sing-offs
Artist lost the Battle and was eliminated

Battles results
Episode	Coach	Order	Winner	Song	Losers	Steal result		
Episode	Coach	Order	Winner	Song	Losers	Gianluca	Destiny	Sarah
Episode 10 (October 10, 2025)	Gianluca	1	Oliver Zammit Attard	"Someone You Loved"	Khloe Chircop	N/A	—	—
Episode 10 (October 10, 2025)	Gianluca	1	Oliver Zammit Attard	"Someone You Loved"	Mia Lanzon	N/A	—	✔
Episode 10 (October 10, 2025)	Gianluca	2	Aidan Borg	"Blank Space"	Izaya Schembri	N/A	—	Team full
Episode 10 (October 10, 2025)	Gianluca	2	Aidan Borg	"Blank Space"	Mia Mifsud	N/A	—	Team full
Episode 10 (October 10, 2025)	Gianluca	2	Aidan Borg	"Blank Space"	Natalia Xerri	N/A	—	Team full
Episode 11 (October 13, 2025)	Destiny	1	Marie Emeh Camilleri	"Unwritten"	Eleny Incorvaja Scerri	—	N/A	Team full
Episode 11 (October 13, 2025)	Destiny	1	Marie Emeh Camilleri	"Unwritten"	Kaylin Camilleri	—	N/A	Team full
Episode 11 (October 13, 2025)	Destiny	2	Eliza Borg	"Hero"	Chanel Abela Camilleri	—	N/A	Team full
Episode 11 (October 13, 2025)	Destiny	2	Eliza Borg	"Hero"	Rachele Maria Nistica	✔	N/A	Team full
Episode 12 (October 14, 2025)	Sarah	1	Carly Cachia Arpa	"Flowers"	Emma Bonnici	Team full	—	Team full
Episode 12 (October 14, 2025)	Sarah	1	Carly Cachia Arpa	"Flowers"	Esme Camilleri Gravina	Team full	—	Team full
Episode 12 (October 14, 2025)	Sarah	1	Carly Cachia Arpa	"Flowers"	Julia Sammut	Team full	—	Team full
Episode 12 (October 14, 2025)	Sarah	2	Skye Gilson	"Flashlight"	Alaiya Cini	Team full	✔	Team full
Episode 12 (October 14, 2025)	Sarah	2	Skye Gilson	"Flashlight"	Naielle Formosa Cumbo	Team full	—	Team full

== Sing-offs ==
The third stage of the show, the sing-offs, aired from October 15, 2025 through October 17, 2025, comprising episodes 13 through 15. In this round, the coaches assign a song to every artist fo their team and then select one of them to advance to the Live Finals.

Artist was chosen by their coach and advanced to the Live Finals
Artist was eliminated

Sing-offs results
Episode	Coach	Order	Artist	Song	Result
Episode 13 (October 15, 2025)	Gianluca	1	Aidan Borg	"Beautiful Things"	Eliminated
Episode 13 (October 15, 2025)	Gianluca	2	Rachele Maria Nistica	"Run"	Advanced
Episode 13 (October 15, 2025)	Gianluca	3	Oliver Zammit Attard	"When We Were Young"	Advanced
Episode 14 (October 16, 2025)	Destiny	1	Marie Emeh Camilleri	"If I Were a Boy"	Advanced
Episode 14 (October 16, 2025)	Destiny	2	Alaiya Cini	"River"	Eliminated
Episode 14 (October 16, 2025)	Destiny	3	Eliza Borg	"Reflection"	Advanced
Episode 15 (October 17, 2025)	Sarah	1	Skye Gilson	"Intrusive Thoughts"	Eliminated
Episode 15 (October 17, 2025)	Sarah	2	Carly Cachia Arpa	"The House of the Rising Sun"	Advanced
Episode 15 (October 17, 2025)	Sarah	3	Mia Lanzon	"Feeling Good"	Advanced

== Live Finals ==
The final, aired on October 18, 2025, consisted of two rounds. The final two artists on every team, or top six, battled to become the winner of the second season of The Voice Kids.

=== First round ===
Artist was chosen by their coach and advanced to Round 2
Artist was eliminated

Live Finals results
Episode	Coach	Order	Artist	Song	Result
Episode 16 (October 18, 2025)	Destiny Chukunyere	1	Eliza Borg	"Clown"	Advanced
Episode 16 (October 18, 2025)	Sarah Bonnici	2	Mia Lanzon	"You Don't Own Me"	Eliminated
Episode 16 (October 18, 2025)	Gianluca Bezzina	3	Rachele Maria Nistica	"My Way"	Advanced
Episode 16 (October 18, 2025)	Destiny Chukunyere	4	Marie Emeh Camilleri	"Listen"	Eliminated
Episode 16 (October 18, 2025)	Sarah Bonnici	5	Carly Cachia Arpa	"Creep"	Advanced
Episode 16 (October 18, 2025)	Gianluca Bezzina	6	Oliver Zammit Attard	"Fought & Lost"	Eliminated

=== Second round ===
Winner
Finalists

Episode	Coach	Artist	Order	Song (Duet with the coach)	Order	Song (Original song) (Note: The titles of the original songs performed in this round, except for the winning entry, were not disclosed.)	Result
Episode 16 (October 18, 2025)	Gianluca Bezzina	Rachele Maria Nistica	1	"A Million Dreams"	5	N/A	Finalists
Episode 16 (October 18, 2025)	Sarah Bonnici	Carly Cachia Arpa	2	"Slipping Through My Fingers"	4	N/A	Finalists
Episode 16 (October 18, 2025)	Destiny Chukunyere	Eliza Borg	3	"When You Believe"	6	"I Believe"	Winner
