= The Myth (band) =

Maltese musical band

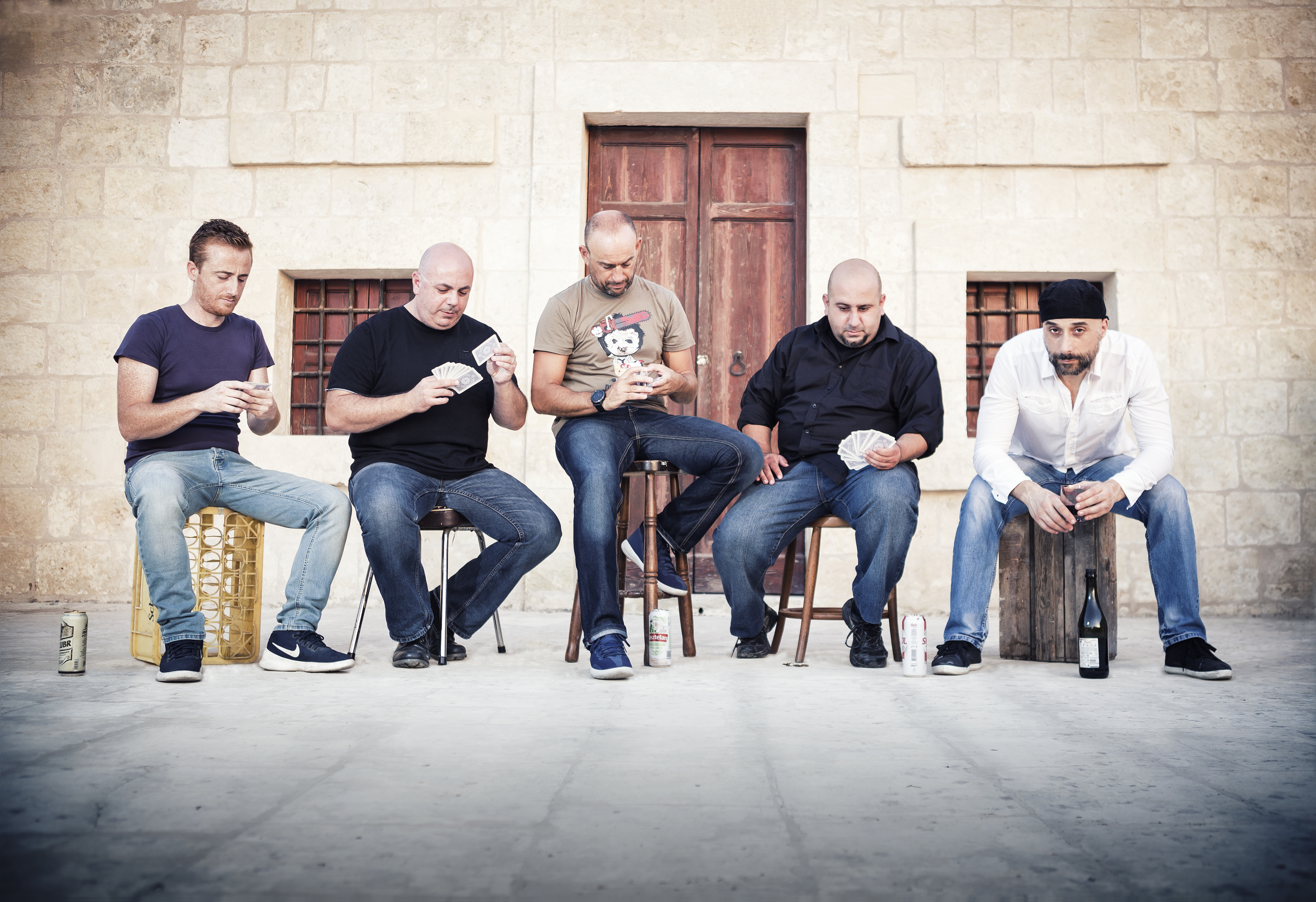
- The Myth

Background information
- Genres: Pop rock
- Years active: 1990–present
- Members: Dion Farrell; Mark Galea; Patrick Mifsud; Stephen Zammit; Mario Saliba

The Myth is a Maltese rock band formed in 1990. They are known for blending rock with acoustic and folk influences. Their debut album, Dreams, was released in 2011. The Myth's current members includes Dion Farrell (guitar and vocals), Mark Galea (drums), Patrick Mifsud (bass), Stephen Zammit (keyboard), and Mario Saliba (guitars).

== History ==
=== Early career (1990–1996) ===
The band was formed by vocalist Dion Farrell and guitarist Mark Galea in September 1990, with their first live performance taking place in November of the same year.

In its early years, the band performed both original compositions and cover songs, characterized by extended guitar solos and bass lines. Two early singles, "Can’t Stop the Fire" and "Midnight", received airplay on Maltese radio and television, but were not commercially released.

=== Experimental phase (1996–2005) ===
From the mid-1990s, the band began experimenting with more acoustic and folk-inspired sounds, incorporating instruments such as pan-pipes and tambourines alongside their rock instrumentation.

=== Britpop phase (2005–2011) ===
In the mid-2000s, The Myth adopted a pop-rock style. "Sworn Independent", originally written in 1996, was released in 2007, marking a shift back toward a mainstream rock sound. Other singles from this period included "Star" and "Animal".

In 2009, lead vocalist Dion Farrell was a finalist in the international 'Song of the Year' songwriting competition.

The band’s debut album, Dreams, was released on 8 August 2011. It compiled singles recorded between 2005 and 2011. The band was also nominated for Best Website at the Malta Music Awards later that year.

=== Pop rock phase (2011–present) ===
Following the release of Dreams, the band released pop-rock singles. Their 2012 single "Sadness in Your Eyes" was later remixed by DJ Toby (Toby Farrugia) for inclusion in the Maltese feature film Silhouette (2013).

Throughout their career, The Myth has toured with acts including the United Kingdom's official Eagles Tribute band (1996); Status Quo (1998); Smokie (1999); and Rhapsody UK, a Queen tribute band (2009).

The group has continued to release singles, including "Beautiful" (2013), "Tonight" (2020), and "Without You" (2022).

== Discography ==
=== Albums ===
- Dreams (2011)

=== Singles ===
- Can’t Stop the Fire (1991)
- Midnight (1992)
- Sworn Independent (2007)
- Star (2008)
- How Does It Feel? (2008)
- Animal (2008)
- Dreams (2009)
- Thank You (2009)
- Crazy (2010)
- Sadness in Your Eyes (2012)
- Sadness in Your Eyes (dance remix by DJ Toby) (2012)
- Beautiful (2013)
- Tonight (2020)
- Without You (2022)
