= Żaqq =

Maltese bagpipe

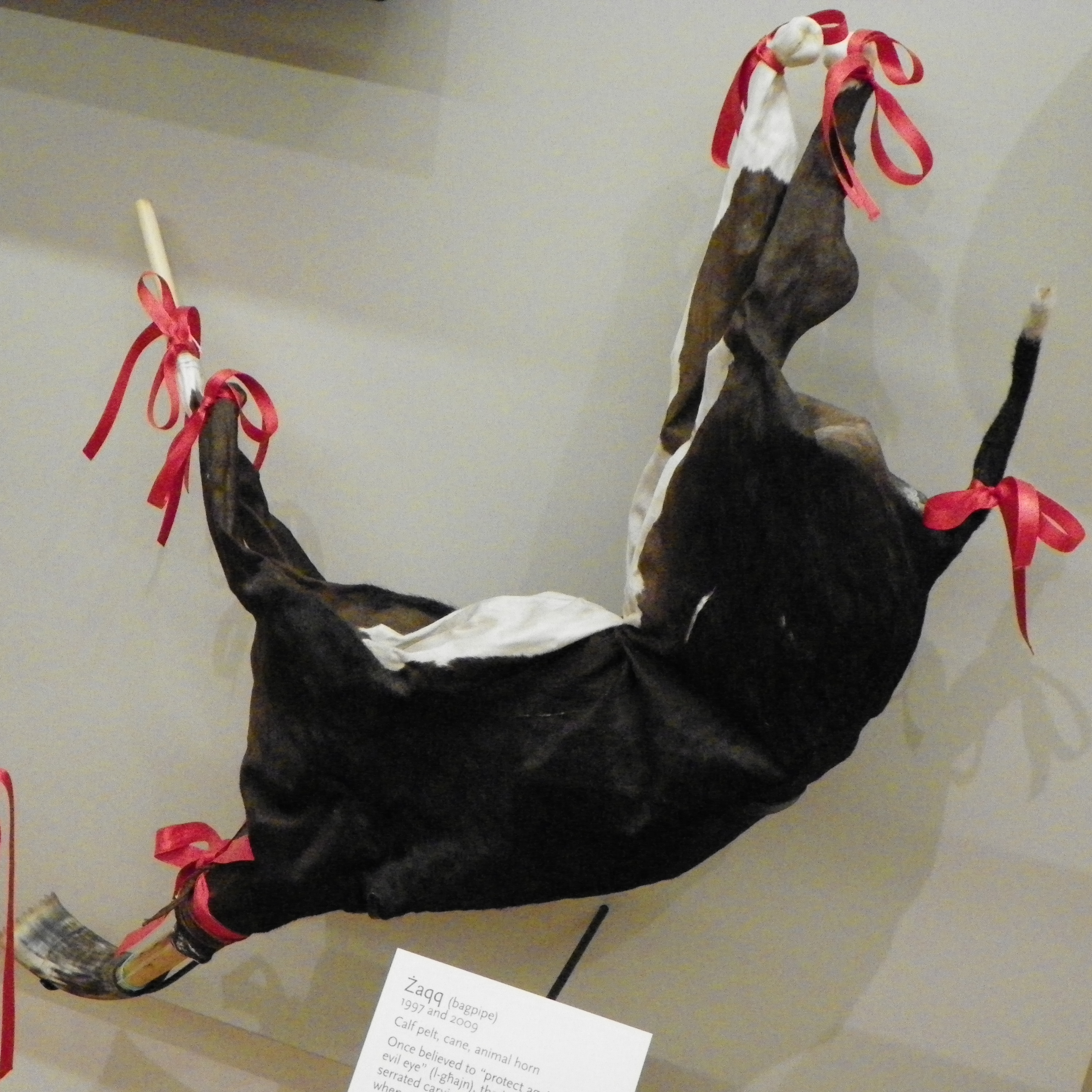
Example of a żaqq, in the Phoenix Musical Instrument Museum.

The żaqq (Maltese pronunciation: [zɐʔ]) is the most common form of Maltese bagpipes, and was once associated with Maltese folk festivals.

== History ==
The use of the żaqq in daily life came to an end in the 1970s, the instrument having been perhaps replaced by the accordion earlier in the century. In 1977 the Galpin Society noted only nine remaining traditional pipers in Malta; the last of these, Toni "l-Hammarun" Cachia, died in 2004. Various folk music ensembles such as Etnika have attempted to revive the instrument.

== Etymology and spelling ==
It is sometimes erroneously referred to as the zapp due to a spelling error in a 1939 English-language publication. The Maltese word żaqq literally means "sack" or "belly" and derives from Arabic ziqq ( "skin" [as a receptacle]). is sometimes stated that żaqq derives from Italian zampogna but this is not the case.
