= Etnika =

Maltese folk band

Etnika is one of Malta's leading modern folk bands founded in 2000.

The four founder members were composer Ruben Żahra, traditional instrument maker Ġużi Gatt, researcher Steve Borġ and musician Andrew Alamango. Their main task was to present a revival of old traditional Maltese instruments, at times, with a fusion with contemporary ones.

In 2000 Etnika released their first album, entitled Nafra. Their second album, Żifna (Dance), was released in 2003; it depicts the sentiment of the island nation with its cross cultural Mediterranean influences.

Their efforts were rewarded by the Award of Music Achievement in the 2001 Malta Music Awards, held in Ta'Qali.

== The beginning ==
In 1999, researcher Steve Borġ, identified a collection of old Maltese melodies at King's College London. The Welshman Edward Jones, formerly the bard to the Prince of Wales, had published these melodies around 1807. Borġ made the melodies public through Etnika in 2000 at the official launch of an exhibition on traditional Maltese instruments. Jones, born in Bala, North Wales, reportedly collected hundreds of Welsh melodies during his walks around the principality.

At the same time composer Ruben Zahra was returning to Malta following years of academic studies at the Conservatorio di Musica di Frosinone, the Accademia Nazionale di Santa Cecilia in Rome and the Accademia Musicale Chigiana in Siena.

An article written well over twenty years before about the demise of the Maltese bagpipe, the żaqq, intrigued the folklorist Guzi Gatt. In 1977 two British students, J.K. Partridge and Frank Jeal, had published their research, entitled 'The Maltese Żaqq', in The Galpin Society Journal. It remains one of the most scholarly and informative works written in this instrument to date. The article described the żaqq's musical abilities, but the authors also claimed that "The Maltese, with few notable exceptions, show little interest in their own folk culture, and any artificial attempts at revival seem unlikely to succeed. It seems sad that an island that can boast an excellent Scots pipe band, can find no room to preserve, perhaps even develop, its own native bagpipe."

Gatt sought out Toni Cachia Il-Ħammarun from Naxxar, one of Malta's remaining Maltese bagpipe builders and musicians. Well into his eighties, Cachia had been playing the traditional instrument since the late 1920s. He agreed to help Gatt in his quest to save the żaqq from extinction.

== The Maltese traditional instruments ==
The Etnika project also aimed at resuscitating traditional Maltese instruments that had fallen out of use and presenting these forgotten soundscapes to Maltese society, with an aim to raise national consciousness.

These instruments included the flejguta (cane whistle flute), the żummara (single reed pipe), the tanbur (frame drum), the żafżava (friction drum) and the żaqq (Maltese bagpipe).

All were built from locally sourced materials including cane, ash, string and animal skins.

== 2000 Nafra ==
Etnika gave their first public concert during the Evenings on Campus festival on 29 August 2000 at the Atriju Vassalli in the University of Malta, during which the album Nafra was released. The album has eleven instrumental tracks, three of which taken from Edward Jones's publication of circa 1807. It featured Godfrey Mifsud on clarinet, Mario Frendo on violin, David Grech on guitar, Tricia Dawn Williams on piano, Jason Fabri on drums, Joe Camilleri l-Bibi on percussion and Ruben Żahra on żaqq and other traditional instruments. Amongst the most popular tracks were Ragħaj (Shepherd) and l-Għanja tal-Mewġ'' (Waves Song). Malta's eminent folklorist Guze Cassar Pullicino was amongst those present.

In 2003, they released Żifna at the Bedouin Bar in San Giljan, Malta. Andrew Alamango and Andrej Vujicic were the producers of this more acoustic album, which Jim Foley favorably reviewed in Rootsworld. oh yes z

== 2003 Bumbum show at Fort Saint Elmo, Valletta ==
In July and August 2003, Etnika presented three concerts entitled Bumbum, at Fort St. Elmo Valletta under the Etnikafe concept of fusing their music with flamenco. This project also included a total of twenty musicians, including four brass musicians, three traditional musicians and two għannejja folk singers, namely Frans Baldacchino il-Budaj and Toni Spiteri Tal-Ġebel.

Etnika backstage: Folksinger Frans Baldacchino Il-Budaj and guitarist Andrew Alamango

A few months later they collaborated with Kneehigh Theatre from Cornwall and a Cypriot theatrical company in a dramatic presentation called A Very Old Man with Enormous Wings in Birgu.

== 2004 Il-Ħolma Ġgantija at Valletta Bastions ==
In 2004 Etnika produced Il-Ħolma Ġgantija (The Giant Dream) beneath the Valletta Bastions.

They have performed extensively throughout Europe, including the Montreux Jazz Festival, in 2004, and in North Africa, including a concert on 29 June 2004 at the Sabratha Roman amphitheatre in Libya.
