= Bitterside =

Maltese band

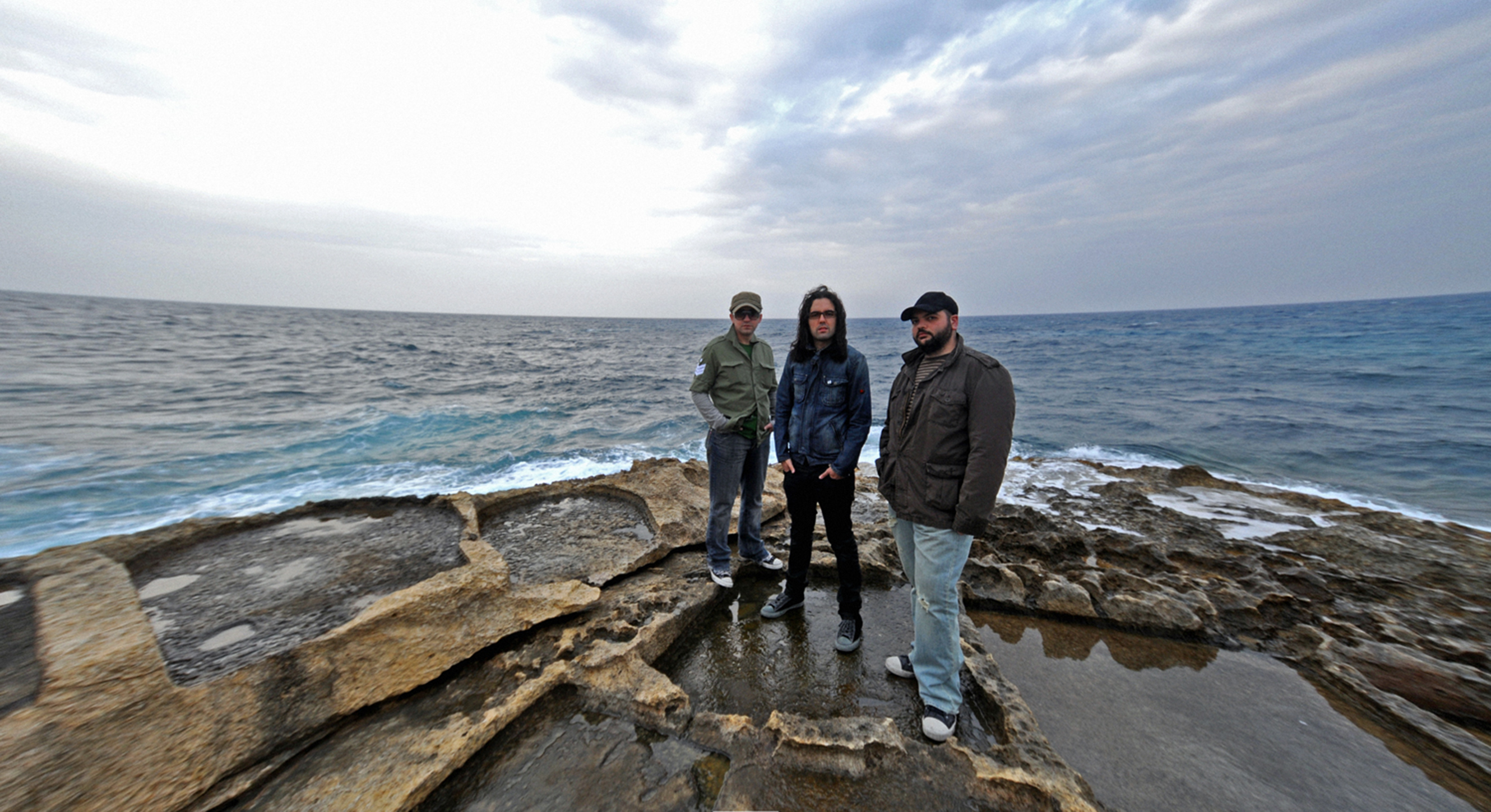
- Bitterside

Background information
- Origin: Malta
- Genres: Alternative, Indie, pop
- Years active: 2000–2010, 2020-present
- Members: Daniel Genius (Vocals, Bass); J. J. Galea (Lead Guitars); Alexei Sammut (Rhythm guitars); Kenneth Vella (Drums)
- Past members: Cliff Smith (Bass); Alan Fava (Bass)
- Website: www.bitterside.net

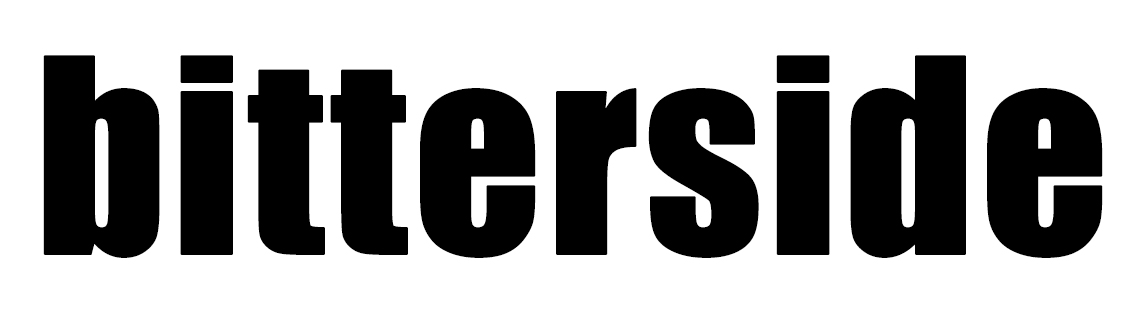

Bitterside, founded in 2000, is an alternative, indie, pop band composed of four members, all coming from Malta. Daniel Genius is the vocalist/bass, J.J. Galea on lead guitars, Alexei Sammut on rhythm guitars and Kenneth Vella on the drums.

== Discography ==
=== Albums ===
- 2004 - Somehow Different
- 2008 - Underrated

=== Singles ===
- Left Alone
- Underrated
- Versus Life
- Start Again
- Shutters
- Drop of Wine
- Fear (the fast song)
- In Me
- So Lovely
- Fire in My Pockets
- Inside Out
- '97
- Something We Call Life
- If You
- The Past (2022)

== Awards ==
- Bay Music Awards : Best Band Award
  2004, 2006
