= Gaia Cauchi =

Maltese singer (born 2002)

Gaia Cauchi M.Q.R.
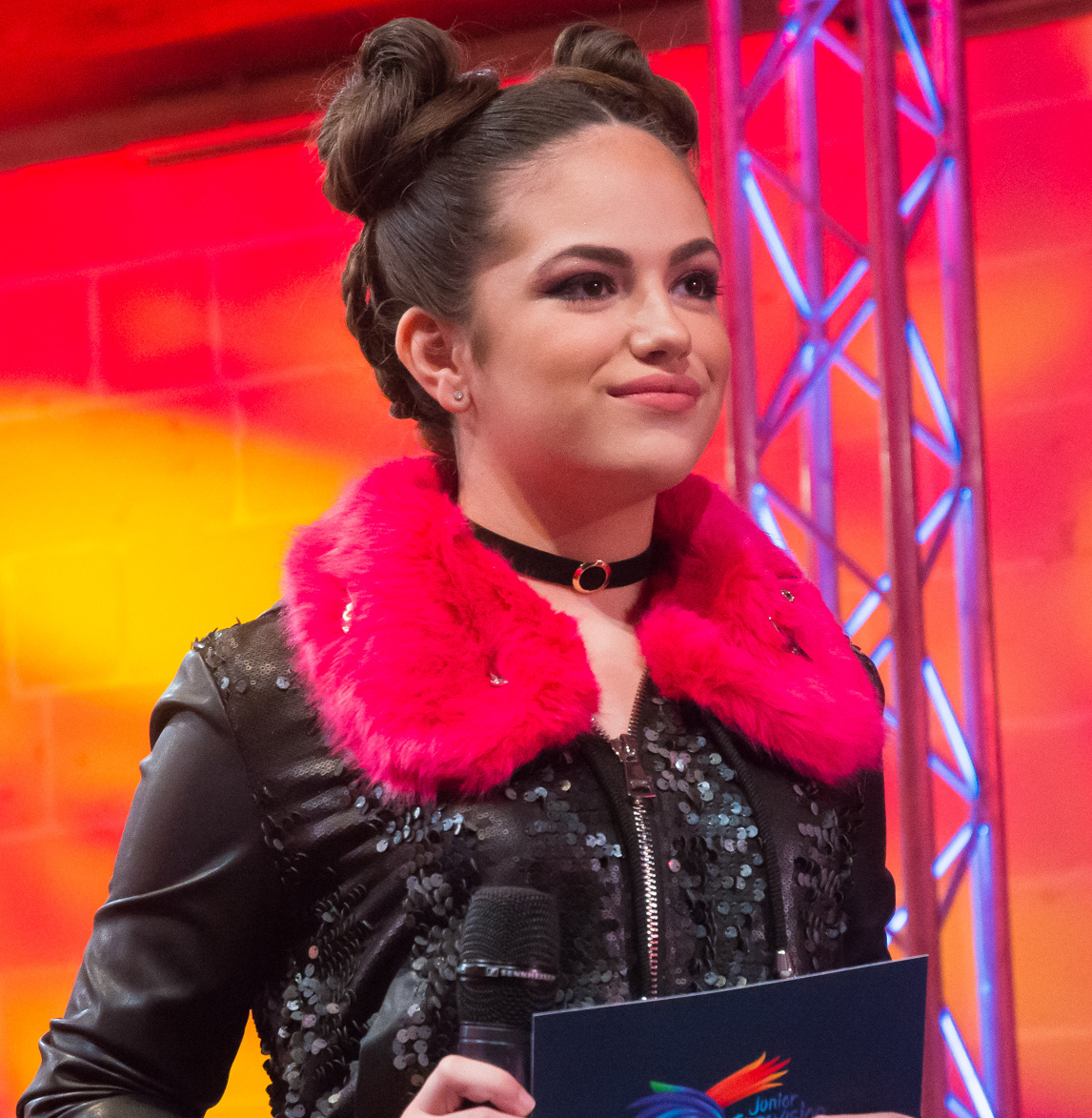
- Cauchi in 2016

Background information
- Born: 19 November 2002 (age 23); Mġarr, Malta
- Genres: Pop; R&B
- Occupation: Singer
- Instrument: Vocals
- Years active: 2004–present

Gaia Cauchi M.Q.R. (Italian pronunciation: [ˈɡaːja ˈkauki], born 19 November 2002) is a Maltese singer. She represented Malta at the Junior Eurovision Song Contest 2013 and won the contest with her song "The Start".

== Life and career ==
=== 2004–2012: Early career ===
Gaia's first "international gig" came in 2011 when she appeared on the popular Italian TV show, Ti Lascio Una Canzone. She took on Tina Turner's "Proud Mary" and left the audience shouting "bellissimo!" (superlative of beautiful in Italian). She won the prestigious Sanremo Junior Music Festival a year later in her category when she was just nine years old. There, she sang "One Night Only", from Dreamgirls.

=== 2013–present: Junior Eurovision Song Contest and breakthrough ===
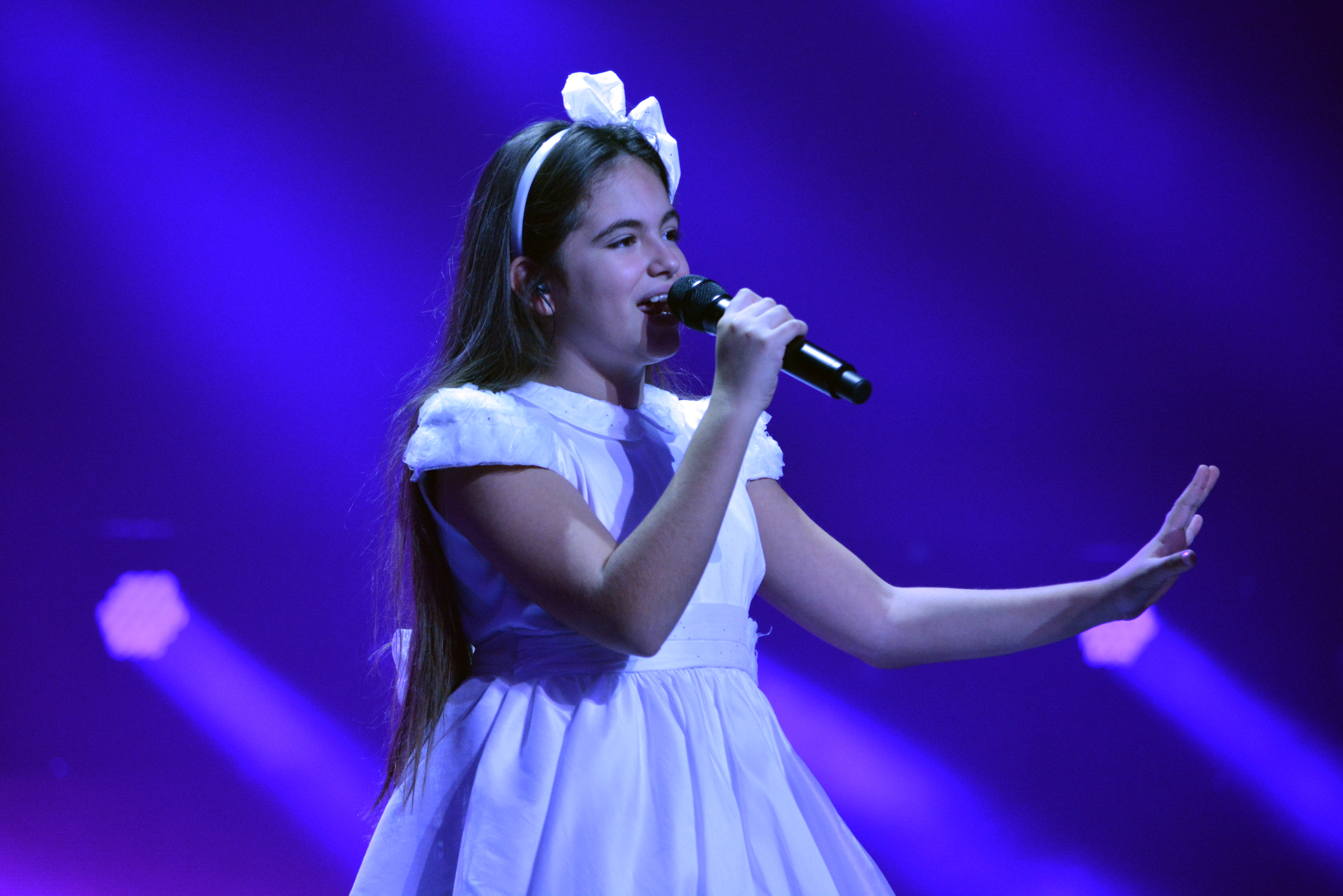
Gaia Cauchi at the dress rehearsal for the Junior Eurovision Song Contest 2013

After a two-year break from the contest, PBS (Public Broadcasting Services) decided to return to the Junior Eurovision. PBS, Malta's national broadcaster went for an internal selection and chose Cauchi to represent the island nation. Cauchi won the contest on 30 November with a 9-point lead over Ukraine. Being the winner of the Junior Eurovision, she was given a trophy which was incidentally broken a few minutes after being awarded, when the contingent had a group hug. She became the first singer from Malta to win the Junior Eurovision Song Contest and the first person from the island nation to win an EBU produced competition.

On 2 December 2013, the Prime Minister Joseph Muscat announced that Cauchi would be awarded the order Xirka Ġieħ ir-Repubblika, the country's highest honour. This move generated controversy, and she and her team were given the Midalja għall-Qadi tar-Repubblika instead on 13 December 2013.

Cauchi made an appearance in the Eurovision Song Contest 2014 performing part of her winning song. At the Junior Eurovision Song Contest 2014 contest, Cauchi performed during the interval act and delivered the "Kids' Jury" points. For the Junior Eurovision Song Contest 2016, which returned to Malta, Cauchi revealed the points from the adult Maltese jury.

In 2015, she represented Malta at the Russian competition New Wave Junior 2015 and eventually won the final of the contest. She became the first artist from outside the Post-Soviet states to win this competition.

In 2018, Cauchi auditioned for the 15th series of The X-Factor. She was placed in the group "Sweet Sense". On 13 October 2018, Judge Robbie Williams sent Sweet Sense, including Gaia, home from the Judges' Houses round.

In 2019, she released a new single "Why Should I?". Cauchi has also been nominated for 3 awards at the Malta Music Awards.

In 2022, for the occasion of the 20th edition of Junior Eurovision Song Contest, she performed as part of the winners interval act in Yerevan.

In 2024, she represented Malta at the Russian competition New Wave. During the contest, she performed "Angels" (originally sang by Chiara), and her two original songs – "11:11" and "Why?".

In 2026, she was a coach on the third season of The Voice Kids Malta and co-hosted the Junior Eurovision Song Contest 2026 in Ta' Qali alongside Destiny Chukunyere and Keane Cutajar

== Discography ==
=== Singles ===
==== As lead artist ====
List of singles as lead artist, with selected chart positions, showing year released and album name
Title	Year	Peak chart positions	Album
Title	Year	MLT Dom. Air.	Album
"Noti u Kliem"	2012	—	Non-album singles
"The Start"	2013	—	Non-album singles
"Floating on Air"	2014	—	Non-album singles
"#Together"	2014	—	Non-album singles
"Children of the Future"	2014	—	Non-album singles
"Hey Hello"	2017	—	Non-album singles
"Why Should I?"	2019	—	Non-album singles
"Over You"	2020	2	Non-album singles
"Message"	2021	—	Non-album singles
"Eye for an Eye"	2022	7	Non-album singles
"Kewkba Feġġeja"	2022	—	Mużika Mużika 2022
"Unlove Me"	2022	4	Non-album singles
"11:11"	2022	—	Non-album singles
"Why?"	2023	1	Non-album singles
"Sincerely, You"	2024	—	Non-album singles
"Cupid"	2024	1	Non-album singles
"Tama"	2026	—	Non-album singles
"Only Good For"	2026	—	Non-album singles
"I Got Them All"	2026	3	Non-album singles
"—" denotes a recording that did not chart or was not released in that territory.

==== As featured artist ====
List of singles as featured artist, with selected chart positions, showing year released and album name
Title	Year	Peak chart positions	Album
Title	Year	MLT Dom. Air.	Album
"Lately" (Sheldona featuring Gaia Cauchi and Kevin Paul Calleja)	2018	9	Non-album singles
"Skin Deep" (Maxine Pace featuring Destiny, Gaia Cauchi and Michela)	2021	—	Non-album singles
"Running" (The Crowns featuring Gaia Cauchi)	2022	3	Non-album singles
"Flavor" (Owen Leuellen featuring Gaia Cauchi)	2022	—	Non-album singles
"What Are We Now?" (Jon Guelas featuring Gaia Cauchi)	2024	2	Non-album singles
"—" denotes a recording that did not chart or was not released in that territory.

=== Other charted songs ===
List of songs with selected chart positions, showing year released and album name
Title	Year	Peak chart positions	Album
Title	Year	MLT Dom. Air.	Album
"Taħt Ħarstek"	2022	6	Non-album single

Awards and achievements
Preceded by Nicole Azzopardi with "Knock Knock!… Boom! Boom!"	Malta in the Junior Eurovision Song Contest; 2013	Succeeded by Federica Falzon with "Diamonds"
Preceded by (Ukraine) Anastasiya Petryk with "Nebo" (Небо)	Winner of the Junior Eurovision Song Contest; 2013	Succeeded by (Italy) Vincenzo Cantiello with "Tu primo grande amore"

Preceded by (Georgia (country)) David Aladashvili and Liza Tsiklauri	Junior Eurovision Song Contest presenter 2026; With: Destiny Chukunyere and Keane Cutajar	Succeeded by Incumbent
