= Stalko =

Maltese musical band

- Stalko's "Grandiloquence" Album Cover

Background information
- Origin: Malta
- Genres: Indie folk
- Years active: 2009–present
- Members: Chris Cini; Tim Ellis; Mike Stivala
- Website: stalkoband.com

Stalko are a Maltese three-piece indie folk band consisting of Chris Cini, Tim Ellis and Mike Stivala. The band's gigging line-up has frequently included Michael Galea (drums), Manuel Pulis (drums), James Baldacchino (bass) and Thomas Cuschieri (bass).

In addition to the typical guitar/bass/drums setup, the trio always employs instruments such as piano, violin, glockenspiel, accordion, harmonica, melodica, ukulele.

== History ==
Stalko were formed in the summer of 2009. After months of song writing, the band made their debut public performance supporting English artist Adem Ilhan at the MITP Theatre, Valletta, on 6 February 2010.

=== 2012: Grandiloquence ===
The band's debut album was released in November 2012, with an orchestrated performance at the Orpheum Theatre, Gzira, Malta.

=== 2016: A Long Wave Goodbye ===
The band released their second album, A Long Wave Goodbye, in March 2016. It was released at the Palace Theatre, Paola.

== Discography ==
=== Albums ===
- Grandiloquence (2012)
- A Long Wave Goodbye (2016)

=== Music Videos ===
- In a Hurry
