= Red Electric (band) =

Maltese rock band

- Also known as: REK; Previously Drive and Red Electrick
- Origin: Malta
- Years active: 2008-present
- Members: Joe Roscoe (vocals); Ivan Borg (bass); Peter Borg (guitar); Aleandro Spiteri Monsigneur (piano)
- Past members: Matthew James Borg (vocals); Jonas Delicata (guitar); Robert Spiteri (drums); Raphael Tonna (drums)
- Website: www.facebook.com/weareredelectric

Red Electric (formerly Drive and Red Electrick) is the name of a Maltese rock band formed in 2008. The current line-up consists of frontman Joe Roscoe (voice and guitars), Peter Borg (guitars), Aleandro Spiteri Monsigneur (keyboardist), and Ivan Borg (bassist). The original line-up was made up of Matthew James Borg (voice and keyboards), Peter Borg (guitars), Jonas Delicata (guitars), Ivan Borg (bass and backing vocals), and Raphael Tonna (drums).

== History ==
Founded in 2008, the band changed its name from 'Drive' to 'Red Electrick', while the founding band members were still at college. The band later released its first album, Vine Lady, in 2010. The band has since released five albums, one EP, and various collaborative singles. Its most popular releases are Right Here, Everybody's Listening, Dangerous, Young Again, G.O.R.G.E.O.U.S, and Who the Heck is REK.

In 2015, drummer Robert Spiteri took over from founding member and drummer Raphael Tonna. In 2018, main vocalist Matthew James Borg left the band, citing personal reasons. Singer Joe Roscoe subsequently joined the band as main vocalist. The name of the band was changed to Red Electric in 2022 and announced on social media alongside their new branding.

In Summer 2022, Red Electric released a new single titled Fix of You. The song was written in 2021 and speaks about being addicted to a toxic relationship and the positive reinforcement resulting from that relationship despite the risk it poses.

Over the years, Red Electric have performed in and toured a number of cities overseas, including Austria, Cyprus, Denmark, Los Angeles, UK, Poland, and Spain. The band has also signed agreements with international companies. In 2009, Red Electric (then Red Electrick) signed an agreement with Poison Tree Records, a Los Angeles-based label for their music to be promoted, released, and distributed digitally worldwide. Another digital agreement was signed in 2011 with another Los Angeles-based distributor, BFM Digital, where their debut album Vine Lady was available on a number of digital stores such as Amazon, Spotify and iTunes. This deal predated the availability of iTunes in Malta.

More significantly, the band released the song 'Right Here' under the Rexius Records label in 2018. The band has since signed a global publishing deal with Reservoir Media in 2021.

Their latest song 'Emotional Surgery' was released in November 2024.

== Discography ==
=== Albums ===
- Vine Lady (2010)
- The Unplugged Sessions (2012)
- Inside You (2016)
- Tragic Optimistic (2019)
- Live at WH21 (2023)

== Notable collaborations ==
Red Electric have collaborated with multiple Maltese artists and groups. The band has released songs in collaboration with singers Joseph Calleja, Destiny, Luke Chappell, and Ira Losco, as well as the Malta Philharmonic Orchestra.

Red Electric have also collaborated with Maltese band The Travellers. The two bands created a concert series where the members of both bands perform together as a single band, with the concert setlist including songs from the discographies of both bands. The first of these concerts occurred in 2019 and was called "1", and the second in 2022 and called "ONE". Part of the proceeds from the 2022 concert were donated to the McDonald House Charities Malta which is an organization that helps families in need.

== Awards and accolades ==
Red Electric have won several local music awards.

Award	Awarding Body	Year	Additional information	Source
Best Newcomer	Bay Music Awards	2009		
Best New Artist	Malta Music Awards	2009		
Best Video	Malta Music Awards	2010	Awarded for the video of "Who the Heck is Rek?"	
Best Band	Bay Music Awards	2012		
Raise the Roof Award	Bay Music Awards	2012	Awarded to the artists with the strongest audience reaction to their live performance, calculated with sensitive microphones.	
Best Band	Malta Music Awards	2013		
Best Song	Malta Music Awards	2013	Awarded for the song "Paul"	
Best Band	Malta Music Awards	2014		
Best Song	Malta Music Awards	2014	Awarded for the song "The Runaway"	
Best Band	Malta Music Awards	2020		
Best Album	Malta Music Awards	2020	Awarded for the album Tragic Optimistic	
