= Portugal in the Junior Eurovision Song Contest 2022 =

- Junior Eurovision Song Contest 2022
- Participating broadcaster: Rádio e Televisão de Portugal (RTP)
- Country: Portugal
- Selection process: Artist: The Voice Kids; Song: Internal selection
- Selection date: Artist: 10 August 2022; Song: 7 November 2022

Competing entry
- Song: "Anos 70"
- Artist: Nicolas Alves
- Songwriters: Carolina Deslandes; Agir

Placement
- Final result: 8th, 121 points

Participation chronology

Portugal was represented at the Junior Eurovision Song Contest 2022 with the song "Anos 70", written by Carolina Deslandes and Agir, and performed by Nicolas Alves. The Portuguese participating broadcaster Rádio e Televisão de Portugal (RTP), selected Alves after being the runner-up on the third season of The Voice Kids, due to the actual winner Maria Gil would be over the age limit at the time of the contest. The song was internally selected.

== Background ==
Prior to the 2022 contest, Portugal participated in the contest five times, first entering in 2006. Portugal finished second-last in both 2006 and 2007, and Portuguese broadcaster Rádio e Televisão de Portugal (RTP) withdrew after the 2007 contest, despite high viewing figures. It returned in 2017 and participated until 2019. RTP provisionally confirmed its participation in the 2020 contest, but ultimately withdrew due to the COVID-19 pandemic. In the 2021 contest, Simão Oliveira represented Portugal with the song "O Rapaz". He finished in 11th place with 101 points, and gained the best result in the history of the country at the Junior Eurovision Song Contest.

== Before Junior Eurovision ==
=== Artist selection ===
RTP once again used the format The Voice Kids to select its representative for the Junior Eurovision Song Contest. Due to the fact that the age range to participate in the show differs from the Junior Eurovision participation age range, the winner wasn't automatically confirmed to be the Portuguese representative in the contest. In the final, held on 31 July 2022, Maria Gil emerged as the winner of the season, marking Fernando Daniel's second consecutive win as a coach. However, Gil could not represent Portugal due to being over the age limit at the time of the contest in Yerevan. On 10 August, RTP confirmed that one of the runners-up, Nicolas Alves, was selected to represent Portugal, as he received the second biggest number of votes to win the competition.

== At Junior Eurovision ==
After the opening ceremony, which took place on 5 December 2022, it was announced that Portugal would perform thirteenth on 11 December 2022, following United Kingdom and preceding Serbia.

=== Voting ===
The same voting system that was introduced in the 2017 edition was used, where the results were determined by 50% online voting and 50% jury voting. Every participating broadcaster assembled a national jury that consisted of three music industry professionals and two children aged between 10 and 15 who were citizens of the country they represented. The rankings of those jurors were combined to make an overall top ten.

The online voting consisted of two phases. The first phase of the online voting began on 9 December 2022 when a recap of all the rehearsal performances was shown on the contest's website Junioreurovision.tv before the viewers could vote. After this, voters also had the option to watch longer one-minute clips from each participant's rehearsal. This first round of voting ended on 11 December at 15:59 CET. The second phase of the online voting took place during the live show and began right after the last performance and was open for 15 minutes. International viewers were able to vote for three songs. They were also able to vote for their own country's song. These votes were then turned into points which were determined by the percentage of votes received. For example, if a song received 10% of the votes, it received 10% of the available points.

Points awarded to Portugal
Score	Country
12 points	
10 points	
8 points	
7 points	Georgia; Italy; Spain
6 points	France; North Macedonia
5 points	Kazakhstan
4 points	Armenia; Netherlands; Poland
3 points	
2 points	
1 point	United Kingdom
Portugal received 70 points from the online vote.

Points awarded by Portugal
Score	Country
12 points	France
10 points	Georgia
8 points	Ukraine
7 points	Armenia
6 points	Italy
5 points	Serbia
4 points	Ireland
3 points	United Kingdom
2 points	Spain
1 point	Albania

==== Detailed voting results ====
Detailed voting results from Portugal
Draw	Country	Juror A	Juror B	Juror C	Juror D	Juror E	Rank	Points
01	Netherlands	10	7	12	13	6	11	
02	Poland	13	11	11	9	7	12	
03	Kazakhstan	12	15	15	15	15	15	
04	Malta	15	14	9	14	14	14	
05	Italy	2	6	10	12	4	5	6
06	France	1	1	1	1	1	1	12
07	Albania	11	12	3	11	9	10	1
08	Georgia	4	2	2	2	5	2	10
09	Ireland	7	4	7	5	13	7	4
10	North Macedonia	14	13	14	10	11	13	
11	Spain	5	10	13	6	8	9	2
12	United Kingdom	9	5	8	4	12	8	3
13	Portugal							
14	Serbia	3	8	4	7	10	6	5
15	Armenia	6	9	5	8	2	4	7
16	Ukraine	8	3	6	3	3	3	8
