= Junior Eurovision Song Contest 2022 =

International song competition for youth

- Spin the Magic

Date and venue
- Final: 11 December 2022
- Venue: Karen Demirchyan Sports and Concerts Complex; Yerevan, Armenia

Organisation
- Organiser: European Broadcasting Union (EBU)
- Executive supervisor: Martin Österdahl

Production
- Host broadcaster: Public Television Company of Armenia (AMPTV)
- Directors: Marcin Migalski; Tomasz Motyl
- Executive producer: David Tserunyan
- Presenters: Iveta Mukuchyan; Garik Papoyan; Karina Ignatyan; Robin the Robot

Participants
- Number of entries: 16
- Returning countries: United Kingdom
- Non-returning countries: Azerbaijan; Bulgaria; Germany; Russia
- Participation map: Competing countries Countries that participated in the past but not in 2022

Vote
- Voting system: The professional jury of each country awards a set of 12, 10, 8–1 points to 10 songs. Viewers around the world vote for 3 songs, and their votes are distributed proportionally. The votes of the jury and the audience make up 50% of all votes.
- Winning song: France "Oh maman !"

The Junior Eurovision Song Contest 2022 was the 20th edition of the Junior Eurovision Song Contest, held on 11 December 2022 at the Karen Demirchyan Sports and Concerts Complex in Yerevan, Armenia, and presented by Iveta Mukuchyan, Garik Papoyan, Karina Ignatyan, and Robin the Robot. It was organised by the European Broadcasting Union (EBU) and host broadcaster Public Television Company of Armenia (AMPTV), who staged the event after winning the 2021 contest for Armenia with the song "Qami Qami" by Maléna. This was the second time that the Junior Eurovision Song Contest was hosted in Armenia, the first being in 2011.

Broadcasters from sixteen countries participated in the contest. The United Kingdom returned after a sixteen-year absence, while Azerbaijan, Bulgaria, Germany, and Russia did not take part after participating in the previous edition.

The winner was France with the song "Oh Maman !" by Lissandro. This was France's second victory in the contest, having last won in 2020. Host country Armenia, Georgia, Ireland, and the United Kingdom completed the top five, with this being the highest placement for Ireland to date. Meanwhile, Kazakhstan achieved their lowest placing to date.

== Location ==
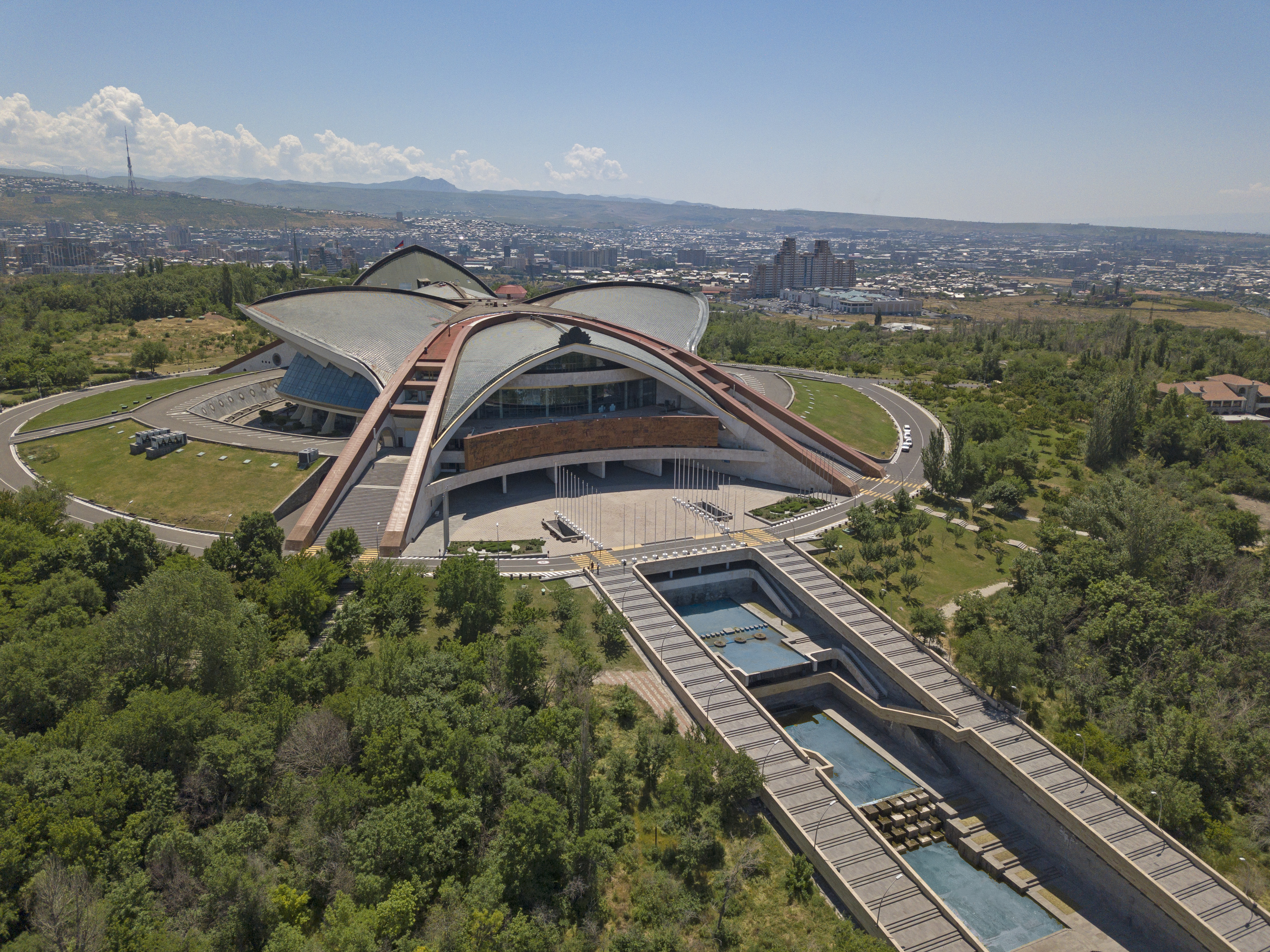
Karen Demirchyan Sports and Concerts Complex, host venue of the 2022 contest.

Location of the selected host city (in blue)

The contest took place at the Karen Demirchyan Sports and Concerts Complex in Yerevan, the capital and largest city of Armenia. The venue previously hosted the 2011 contest. It was also the third consecutive time the contest is held in a capital city. The budget for the event was ֏ 5 billion (€11.9 million), of which ֏ 2.3 billion came from the Armenian government's emergency fund.

=== Bidding phase and host city selection ===
Armenia's hosting had been confirmed by the EBU on 21 December 2021, following their win at the 2021 contest two days before. Originally, unlike in the Eurovision Song Contest, the winning country did not receive the automatic rights to host the next contest. The venue was revealed on 17 February 2022 during a cabinet meeting of the Armenian government, where Prime Minister Nikol Pashinyan made the announcement. Pashinyan also mentioned that the government had allocated funds to the venue to prepare for the event. It was already reported earlier in that week that Yerevan would be the host city.

== Participants ==
On 26 September 2022, the EBU announced that 16 countries would participate in the contest. After a 16-year hiatus, the United Kingdom returned to the contest, with the British Broadcasting Corporation (BBC) replacing ITV, who previously organised the country’s participation in the contest between 2003 and 2005. Azerbaijan, Bulgaria, Germany and Russia withdrew after having participated in 2021. Despite confirming its intention to participate in the 2022 contest, Bulgaria would end up withdrawing before the deadline for unknown reasons. Meanwhile, Russia and its broadcasters were indefinitely suspended from the EBU in the wake of the Russian invasion of Ukraine, with their National Final being cancelled in July 2022.

Prior to the contest, a digital compilation album featuring all the songs from the 2022 contest was put together by the European Broadcasting Union and released by Universal Music on 30 November 2022.

Participants of the Junior Eurovision Song Contest 2022
Country	Broadcaster	Artist	Song	Language	Songwriter(s)
Albania	RTSH	Kejtlin Gjata	"Pakëz diell"	Albanian	Kejtlin Gjata; Endri Muça
Armenia	AMPTV	Nare	"Dance!"	Armenian, English	Nick Egibyan; Grigor Kyokchyan
France	France Télévisions	Lissandro	"Oh Maman !"	French	Frédéric Château; Barbara Pravi
Georgia	GPB	Mariam Bigvava	"I Believe"	Georgian, English	Beni Kdagidze; Iru Khechanovi; Giorgi Kukhianidze
Ireland	TG4	Sophie Lennon	"Solas"	Irish	Hannah Featherstone; Jonas Gladnikoff; Matthew "MaJiKer" Ker; Ken McHugh; Niall Mooney
Italy	RAI	Chanel Dilecta	"Bla Bla Bla"	Italian, English	Marco Iardella; Fabrizio Palaferri; Angela Senatore; Carmine Spera
Kazakhstan	KA	David Charlin	"Jer-Ana (Mother Earth)" (Жер-Ана)	Kazakh, English	Jordan Arakelyan; Serzhan Bakhitzhan; Khamit Shangaliyev
Malta	PBS	Gaia Gambuzza	"Diamonds in the Skies"	English	Matthew James Borg
Netherlands	AVROTROS	Luna	"La festa"	Dutch, English	Robert Dorn
North Macedonia	MRT	Lara feat. Jovan and Irina	"Životot e pred mene" (Животот е пред мене)	Macedonian, English	Darko Dimitrov; Lara Trpčeska; Jovan Trpčeski; Simon Trpčeski
Poland	TVP	Laura	"To the Moon"	Polish, English	Jakub Krupski; Monika Wydrzyńska
Portugal	RTP	Nicolas Alves	"Anos 70"	Portuguese (Note: Specifically Brazilian Portuguese.)	Agir; Carolina Deslandes
Serbia	RTS	Katarina Savić	"Svet bez granica" (Свет без граница)	Serbian	Ivana Dragićević
Spain	RTVE	Carlos Higes	"Señorita"	Spanish, English	Carlos Higes Torres (Note: Despite Carlos Higes' involvement in writing "Señorita", he was not credited on the album or the live broadcast.); Michael James Down; Primož Poglajen; Will Taylor
Ukraine	UA:PBC	Zlata Dziunka	"Nezlamna (Unbreakable)" (Незламна)	Ukrainian, English	Zlata Dziunka; Illaria
United Kingdom	BBC	Freya Skye	"Lose My Head"	English	Deepend; Jack Hawitt; Amber van Day

== Production ==
=== Visual design ===
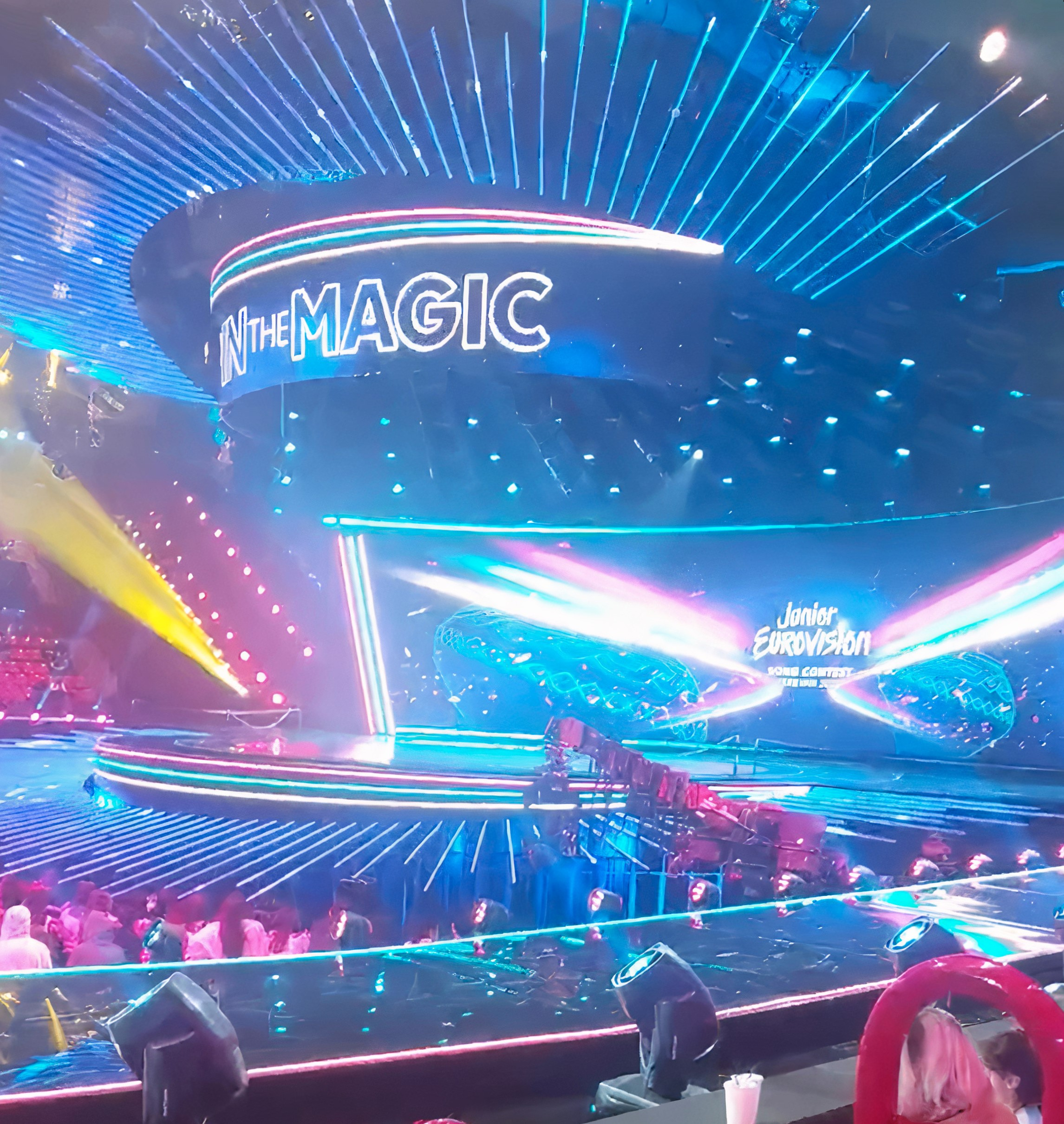
The stage of Junior Eurovision 2022

The reveal of the contest's theme art had been delayed due to the September clashes between Armenia and Azerbaijan. In a press release, AMPTV stated that "preparations for the contest are ongoing, and according to the schedule, it was no longer possible to change the deadlines", while expressing hope that the contest would be held in peaceful conditions. The theme art and slogan for the contest, "Spin the Magic", was later revealed on 26 September 2022. The artwork features an Armenian-styled spinning top as the main motif.

=== Postcards ===
Contestants were featured in "postcard" video introductions, set in different locations across Armenia. Each began with a short clip of the upcoming performer using the Armenian-style spinning top on a particular piece of structure. Following that, a stream of light in the colours of the upcoming country's flag emanated from the structure and traveled to the Karen Demirchyan Sports and Concerts Complex, signalling the start of the upcoming performance.

- Netherlands – Zvartnots Cathedral
- Poland – Yerevan 2800th Anniversary Park
- Kazakhstan – Republic Square
- Malta – East entrance of the Republic Square metro station
- Italy – Temple of Garni
- France – Mother Armenia
- Albania – One of the oldest houses near Hanrapetutyan Street, Yerevan
- Georgia – 50th Anniversary Monument to Soviet Armenia
- Ireland – A fountain in Republic Square
- North Macedonia – The Matenadaran
- Spain – Cafesjian Center for the Arts
- United Kingdom – Monument to David of Sassoun
- Portugal – Yerevan Opera House
- Serbia – A fountain in the Yerevan 2800th Anniversary Park
- Armenia – Geghard Monastery
- Ukraine – Yerevan Botanical Garden

=== Presenters ===
Iveta Mukuchyan, Garik Papoyan and Karina Ignatyan were the presenters of the show. Ignatyan was the Armenian entrant in the Junior Eurovision Song Contest 2019, and Mukuchyan was the Armenian entrant in the Eurovision Song Contest 2016. The hosts were revealed on 18 November. Robin the Robot, a robot with artificial emotions developed by Armenian IT company Expper Technologies, was revealed as the guest presenter on 1 December.

== Contest overview ==
The event took place on 11 December 2022 at 19:00 AMT (16:00 CET). Sixteen countries participated, with the running order published on 5 December 2022. All the countries competing were eligible to vote with the jury vote, as well as participating and non-participating countries under an aggregated international online vote, eligible to vote. France won with 203 points, also winning the jury vote. Armenia came second with 180 points, with Georgia, Ireland, and the United Kingdom, who won the online vote, completing the top five. Albania, Serbia, North Macedonia, Kazakhstan, and Malta occupied the bottom five positions.

The opening of the show featured the traditional flag parade, with all participants performing the common song "Spin the Magic". During the interval, Maléna performed her new single "Can’t Feel Anything", followed by Rosa Linn performing "Snap", with which she represented Armenia in the Eurovision Song Contest 2022. Closing the interval, ten previous Junior Eurovision winners performed their winning songs, for the occasion of the 20th edition of the event, alongside Maléna: Bzikebi (2008), Ralf Mackenbach (2009), Vladimir Arzumanyan (2010), Candy (2011), Gaia Cauchi (2013), Vincenzo Cantiello (2014), Destiny Chukunyere (2015), Mariam Mamadashvili (2016), Viki Gabor (2019), and Valentina (2020). The other eight winning songs were performed by the Tavush Diocese Children’s Choir.

As the event began, the United Kingdom's Freya Skye was unable to sing live for the rehearsal that was filmed before the voting opened for medical reasons, and playback was used. The issue continued into the jury show, where footage from the first rehearsal was used as a replacement. During the jury show, camera and in-ear device issues were reported for Serbia's Katarina Savić, who was allowed to perform again after the scheduled final performance of Ukraine's Zlata Dziunka. On the day of the contest, Savić did not perform live due to medical issues, and footage from her jury show performance was used instead.

R/O	Country	Artist	Song	Points	Place
1	Netherlands	Luna	"La festa"	128	7
2	Poland	Laura	"To the Moon"	95	10
3	Kazakhstan	David Charlin	"Jer-Ana (Mother Earth)"	47	15
4	Malta	Gaia Gambuzza	"Diamonds in the Skies"	43	16
5	Italy	Chanel Dilecta	"Bla Bla Bla"	95	11
6	France	Lissandro	"Oh Maman !"	203	1
7	Albania	Kejtlin Gjata	"Pakëz diell"	94	12
8	Georgia	Mariam Bigvava	"I Believe"	161	3
9	Ireland	Sophie Lennon	"Solas"	150	4
10	North Macedonia	Lara feat. Jovan and Irina	"Životot e pred mene"	54	14
11	Spain	Carlos Higes	"Señorita"	137	6
12	United Kingdom	Freya Skye	"Lose My Head"	146	5
13	Portugal	Nicolas Alves	"Anos 70"	121	8
14	Serbia (Note: Due to medical reasons related to their representative Katarina Savić, Serbia competed using footage from their jury show performance, recorded on 10 December.)	Katarina Savić	"Svet bez granica"	92	13
15	Armenia	Nare	"Dance!"	180	2
16	Ukraine	Zlata Dziunka	"Nezlamna (Unbreakable)"	111	9

=== Spokespersons ===
The 12 points from the juries were announced live by a spokesperson from each country. Countries that did not provide their own spokesperson had their 12 points announced by a former winner or participant.

1. Netherlands – Ralf Mackenbach
2. Poland – Viki Gabor
3. Kazakhstan – Hallash
4. Malta – Gaia Cauchi
5. Italy – Vincenzo Cantiello
6. France – Valentina
7. Albania – Mariam Gvaladze
8. Georgia – Niko Kajaia
9. Ireland – Holly Lennon
10. North Macedonia – Mariam Mamadashvili
11. Spain – Juan Diego Álvarez
12. United Kingdom – Tabitha Joy
13. Portugal – Emily Alves
14. Serbia – Petar Aničić
15. Armenia – Maléna
16. Ukraine – Mykola Oliinyk

== Detailed voting results ==
Split results
Place	Combined		Jury		Online vote	
Place	Country	Points	Country	Points	Country	Points
1	France	203	France	132	United Kingdom	80
2	Armenia	180	Georgia	114	Spain	78
3	Georgia	161	Armenia	110	France	71
4	Ireland	150	Ireland	88	Armenia; Netherlands; Portugal	70
5	United Kingdom	146	United Kingdom	66	Armenia; Netherlands; Portugal	70
6	Spain	137	Spain	59	Armenia; Netherlands; Portugal	70
7	Netherlands	128	Netherlands	58	Ukraine	64
8	Portugal	121	Albania	51	Ireland	62
9	Ukraine	111	Portugal	51	Italy; Poland	53
10	Poland	95 (Note: Two songs tied for 10th highest score with 95 points, but the official scoreboard ranks Poland as 10th and Italy as 11th. This is consistent with the tie-breaking rule that the song that received points from the most countries ranks higher in the case of a tie.)	Ukraine	47	Italy; Poland	53
11	Italy	95	Poland	42	Serbia	51
12	Albania	94	Italy	42	Georgia	47
13	Serbia	92	Serbia	41	Albania	43
14	North Macedonia	54	North Macedonia	12	Kazakhstan; North Macedonia	42
15	Kazakhstan	47	Malta	10	Kazakhstan; North Macedonia	42
16	Malta	43	Kazakhstan	5	Malta	33

Detailed voting results
Voting procedure used: 100% jury vote 100% online vote		Total score	Jury vote score	Online vote score	Jury vote															
Voting procedure used: 100% jury vote 100% online vote		Total score	Jury vote score	Online vote score	Netherlands	Poland	Kazakhstan	Malta	Italy	France	Albania	Georgia	Ireland	North Macedonia	Spain	United Kingdom	Portugal	Serbia	Armenia	Ukraine
Contestants	Netherlands	128	58	70			3	8		3	7		4	3	8	7		6	6	3
Contestants	Poland	95	42	53	2			5	5		8		3	4	2				7	6
Contestants	Kazakhstan	47	5	42					4	1										
Contestants	Malta	43	10	33							1				5				3	1
Contestants	Italy	95	42	53			4	2		2	12	12					6	3	1	
Contestants	France	203	132	71	12	5	8		12		10	10	12	10	6	10	12	10	10	5
Contestants	Albania	94	51	43		6	6	7	3	8		4	7			4	1	5		
Contestants	Georgia	161	114	47	8	12	7	6	10	5	2		2	8	10	5	10	7	12	10
Contestants	Ireland	150	88	62	7	10		12	6	10		2		7	3	6	4	12	2	7
Contestants	North Macedonia	54	12	42	1								5					4		2
Contestants	Spain	137	59	78	3	1	2	10	1	4	4	1	1	5		12	2	1	8	4
Contestants	United Kingdom	146	66	80	6	3	1	1	8	7	6	8		2	4		3		5	12
Contestants	Portugal	121	51	70	4	4	5		7	6		7		6	7	1			4	
Contestants	Serbia	92	41	51	10	8			2			3	8	1	1	3	5			
Contestants	Armenia	180	110	70	5	2	12	4		12	5	5	10	12	12	8	7	8		8
Contestants	Ukraine	111	47	64		7	10	3			3	6	6			2	8	2		

Below is a summary of all 12 points received from each country's professional juries.

12 points awarded by juries
#	Recipient	Countries giving 12 points
4	Armenia	France, Kazakhstan, North Macedonia, Spain
4	France	Ireland, Italy, Netherlands, Portugal
2	Georgia	Armenia, Poland
2	Ireland	Malta, Serbia
2	Italy	Albania, Georgia
1	Spain	United Kingdom
1	United Kingdom	Ukraine

== Broadcasts ==
Broadcasts in participating countries
Country	Channel(s)	Commentator(s)	Ref.
Albania	RTSH 1, RTSH Muzikë, Radio Tirana 1	Andri Xhahu	
Armenia	AMPTV	Hamlet Arakelyan and Hrachuhi Utmazyan	
France	France 2	Stéphane Bern and Carla Lazzari	
Georgia	First Channel	Nika Lobiladze	
Ireland	TG4	Sinéad Ní Uallacháin	
Italy	Rai 1	Mario Acampa, Francesca Fialdini, Rosanna Vaudetti and Gigliola Cinquetti	
Kazakhstan	Khabar TV	Kaldybek Zhaisanbai and Mahabbat Esen	
Malta	TVM	No commentary	
Netherlands	NPO 3, NPO Zapp	Bart Arens and Matheu Hinzen	
North Macedonia	MRT 1	Eli Tanaskovska	
Poland	TVP1, TVP Polonia, TVP ABC	Aleksander Sikora	
Portugal	RTP1, RTP Internacional	Nuno Galopim and Iolanda Ferreira	
Serbia	RTS 2, RTS Svet	Kristina Radenković	
Spain	La 1, TVE Internacional, TVE 4K	Tony Aguilar and Julia Varela	
Ukraine	Suspilne Kultura	Timur Miroshnychenko	
United Kingdom	BBC One, CBBC	Lauren Layfield and Hrvy	

Broadcasters and commentators in non-participating countries
Country	Broadcaster(s)	Commentator(s)	Ref.
Germany	Kika	Constantin Zöller	

== See also ==
- Eurovision Song Contest 2022
- Eurovision Young Musicians 2022
