= Run My Way =

2026 single by December 10

Single by December 10

from the EP On Your Side
- Released: 30 January 2026
- Length: 2:44
- Label: Syco Records; EMI
- Songwriters: Savan Kotecha; Rami Yacoub; Carl Falk; Gabe Yaron
- Producers: Savan Kotecha; Rami Yacoub; Carl Falk; Gabe Yaron

December 10 singles chronology
"Run My Way" (2026)	"Angel" (2026)

Music video
- "Run My Way" on YouTube

"Run My Way" is the debut single by English–Irish boyband December 10. It was released on 30 January 2026, through Syco Records and EMI.

== Background ==
The boyband was formed in December 2025 through the Netflix series Simon Cowell: The Next Act. After the group released a cover of NSYNC's Bye Bye Bye, the group released a snippet of their debut single "Run My Way" on social media. The song also featured on Toyota Motor Europe's Aygo X advertising campaign, serving as the band's first brand partner. They released the song on 30 January 2026.

== Charts ==
Chart	Peak position
UK Singles (Official Charts)	68
Ireland (IRMA)	97
New Zealand (Recorded Music NZ)	25
