= Albania in the Junior Eurovision Song Contest 2022 =

- Junior Eurovision Song Contest 2022
- Country: Albania
- Selection process: Junior Fest 2022
- Selection date: 25 October 2022

Competing entry
- Song: "Pakëz diell"
- Artist: Kejtlin Gjata
- Songwriters: Kejtlin Gjata; Endri Muça

Placement
- Final result: 12th, 94 points

Participation chronology

Albania was represented at the Junior Eurovision Song Contest 2022, which was held on 11 December 2022 in Yerevan, Armenia. Kejtlin Gjata was selected to represent the country with the song "Pakëz diell" through the national selection competition Junior Fest 2022, organised on 25 October 2022 by Radio Televizioni Shqiptar (RTSH).

== Background ==
Prior to the 2022 contest, Albania had participated in the Junior Eurovision Song Contest seven times since its first entry in 2012, only opting not to participate at the 2013, 2014 and 2020 contests. Albania has never won the contest, with their best result being in 2015, with the song "Dambaje" by Mishela Rapo achieving fifth place with a score of 93 points. In 2021, Anna Gjebrea represented Albania in Paris, France with the song "Stand By You". The country ended in 14th place out of 19 countries, achieving 84 points.

== Before Junior Eurovision ==
=== Junior Fest 2022 ===
The Albanian broadcaster Radio Televizioni Shqiptar (RTSH) revealed in July 2022 that the Albanian representative would be chosen via the national selection competition Junior Fest 2022. Interested artists from Albania and Kosovo were able to send in their applications, starting from 20 July 2022 until 5 September 2022, with only final versions of their entries being accepted. The 20 participating acts for the final, which was broadcast on 25 October 2022 on 18:00 CET but filmed at an unknown time in the Gjon Simoni Hall in Tirana, were revealed on 28 September 2022. Three acts previously shortlisted did not appear during the final: Ajlis Disha with the song "Motrat shoqe", Sibora Teqja with the song "Ne jemi paqja që sundon në botë" and Viola Gjyzeli with the song "Afrika". Gjyzeli went on to represent Albania in the Junior Eurovision Song Contest 2023 with the song "Bota ime". The winner was selected solely by a jury panel consisting of Kejsi Tola (Albanian representative in the Eurovision Song Contest 2009), Efi Gjika (Albanian representative in the Junior Eurovision Song Contest 2018) and Anna Gjebrea (Albanian representative in the Junior Eurovision Song Contest 2021). Gjebrea also performed her new single "Throwback" as the interval act.

Final – 25 October 2022
Draw	Artist	Song	Songwriter(s)	Place
1	Armela Kosta	"Ndriço"	Edmond Rrapi, Sandër Mara	—
2	Armela Shane	"Shqipëria ime"	Miron Kotani, Isidor Koti	—
3	Ajshel Zykollari	"Syhëna rozali"	Diana Ziu, Mimoza Bici	—
4	Alesia Uruçi	"Qyteti im"	Flamur Shehu	—
5	Biornis Maxhallaku	"Emocione për dy zemra"	Ylli Kalaja, Aulon Kalaja	—
6	Dea Amoniku	"Nuk jemi lodër per asnjëri"	Edmond Zhulali, Zhuliana Jorganxhi	2
7	Eisi Mehmeti	"Dilemat"	Ergys Pinari, Eriona Rushiti	—
8	Ejza Hoxha	"Plot ëndrra jetën e dua"	Petrit Tërkuçi, Mimoza Tola	—
9	Erta Jonuzi	"Premtim"	Eriona Rushiti	3
10	Irsa Mashi	"Dua të besoj"	Roland Guli, Meri Guli	—
11	Kei Piqani	"Shoqja ime më e mirë"	Petro Piqani, Kei Piqani	—
12	Keit Hitaj	"Yjet e shpresës"	Aulon Naçi, Anila Toto	—
13	Kejtlin Gjata	"Pakëz diell"	Kejtlin Gjata, Endri Muça	1
14	Melodi Heta	"Balerinë do bëhem"	Petrit Sinamati	—
15	Noemi Pjetra	"Simfoni"	Stine Records, Anila Gavaçi	—
16	Sara Elshani	"Adoleshentët"	Jetmir Mehmedaj, Suela Takaj	—
17	Sindi Zeka	"Botë bardhezi"	Elvis Peçi	—
18	Viola Beshiri	"Qielli i moshës sime"	Ylli Ramzoti, Agim Bajrami	—

== At Junior Eurovision ==
After the opening ceremony, which took place on 5 December 2022, it was announced that Albania would perform seventh on 11 December 2022, following France and preceding Georgia.

=== Voting ===
The same voting system that was introduced in the 2017 edition was used, where the results were determined by 50% online voting and 50% jury voting. Every participating broadcaster assembled a national jury that consisted of three music industry professionals and two children aged between 10 and 15 who were citizens of the country they represented. The rankings of those jurors were combined to make an overall top ten.

The online voting consisted of two phases. The first phase of the online voting began on 9 December 2022 when a recap of all the rehearsal performances was shown on the contest's website Junioreurovision.tv before the viewers could vote. After this, voters also had the option to watch longer one-minute clips from each participant's rehearsal. This first round of voting ended on 11 December at 15:59 CET. The second phase of the online voting took place during the live show and began right after the last performance and was open for 15 minutes. International viewers were able to vote for three songs. They were also able to vote for their own country's song. These votes were then turned into points which were determined by the percentage of votes received. For example, if a song received 10% of the votes, it received 10% of the available points.

Points awarded to Albania
Score	Country
12 points	
10 points	
8 points	France
7 points	Ireland; Malta
6 points	Kazakhstan; Poland
5 points	Serbia
4 points	Georgia; United Kingdom
3 points	Italy
2 points	
1 point	Portugal
Albania received 43 points from the online vote.

Points awarded by Albania
Score	Country
12 points	Italy
10 points	France
8 points	Poland
7 points	Netherlands
6 points	United Kingdom
5 points	Armenia
4 points	Spain
3 points	Ukraine
2 points	Georgia
1 point	Malta

==== Detailed voting results ====
Detailed voting results from Albania
Draw	Country	Juror A	Juror B	Juror C	Juror D	Juror E	Rank	Points
01	Netherlands	13	11	1	12	2	4	7
02	Poland	14	12	2	7	1	3	8
03	Kazakhstan	12	8	13	15	5	13	
04	Malta	11	13	10	5	6	10	1
05	Italy	1	1	14	1	4	1	12
06	France	3	4	3	3	3	2	10
07	Albania							
08	Georgia	10	7	15	4	7	9	2
09	Ireland	7	9	5	13	13	11	
10	North Macedonia	8	14	7	10	15	15	
11	Spain	2	10	4	9	12	7	4
12	United Kingdom	6	5	9	2	14	5	6
13	Portugal	15	6	6	14	8	12	
14	Serbia	9	15	8	11	9	14	
15	Armenia	4	3	11	6	11	6	5
16	Ukraine	5	2	12	8	10	8	3
