= On Your Side (December 10 EP) =

2026 EP by December 10

EP by December 10
- Released: 10 July 2026
- Length: 25:06
- Labels: Syco; EMI
- Producers: Julian Bunetta; Rami Yacoub; Carl Falk; Gabe Yaron; Ido Zmishlany; Poo Bear; The Audibles; Steve Mac; GXL

Singles from On Your Side
- 1. "Run My Way" Released: 30 January 2026; 2. "Angel" Released: 6 March 2026; 3. "Infinity (123)" Released: 16 May 2026

On Your Side is the debut extended play by English–Irish boyband December 10. It was released on 10 July 2026, through Syco Music and EMI.

== Background and promotion ==
After the group was formed in December 2025, they released a string of singles; "Run My Way" on 30 January 2026; "Angel" on 6 March 2026; and Infinity (123) on 16 May 2026. During their "December 10: The Next Step" headlining tour, they announced their debut EP, On Your Side.

== Track listing ==
On Your Side track listing
No.	Title	Writer(s)	Producers	Length
1.	"Run My Way"	Savan Kotecha; Rami Yacoub; Carl Falk; Gabe Yaron	Kotecha; Yacoub; Falk; Yaron	2:44
2.	"Angel"	Julian Bunetta; Ido Zmishlany; Sophia Brenan; Jon Shave; Rory Adams; Kotecha	Bunetta	2:26
3.	"Infinity (123)"	Bunetta; Zmishlany; John Ryan; Ian Kirkpatrick; Alexander Izquierdo	Bunetta; Zmishlany	2:20
4.	"Us Against the World"	Falk; Kotecha; Yacoub; Nick Van Eede	Falk; Kotecha; Yacoub	2:43
5.	"On Your Side"	Zmishlany; Sarah Solovay	Zmishlany	3:07
6.	"What Are We Now"	Dominic Jordan; Jason Boyd; Jimmy Giannos; Nabeel Y.Zahid	Poo Bear; The Audibles	3:08
7.	"End of Beginning"	Joe Keery	Steve Mac	3:27
8.	"Angel - Stripped"	Bunetta; Zmishlany; Brenan; Shave; Adams; Kotecha	GXL	2:26
9.	"Run My Way - Stripped"	Kotecha; Yacoub; Yaron; Falk	GXL	2:45
Total length:				25:06

== Charts ==
Chart performance for On Your Side
Chart	Peak position
UK Albums (Official Charts)	5
Irish Albums (IRMA)	3
