= Armenia in the Junior Eurovision Song Contest 2022 =

- Junior Eurovision Song Contest 2022
- Country: Armenia
- Selection process: Internal selection
- Announcement date: Artist: 28 October 2022; Song: 12 November 2022

Competing entry
- Song: "Dance!"
- Artist: Nare
- Songwriters: Grigor Kyokchyan; Nick Egibyan

Placement
- Final result: 2nd, 180 points

Participation chronology

Armenia participated in and hosted the Junior Eurovision Song Contest 2022 in Yerevan, having internally selected its representative, Nare with the song "Dance!", written by Grigor Kyokchyan and Nick Egibyan.

Armenia was selected to perform fifteenth in the running order, following the entry from Serbia and preceding the entry from Ukraine. At the conclusion of voting, Armenia finished in second position with 180 points.

== Background ==
Prior to the 2022 contest, Armenia had participated in the Junior Eurovision Song Contest fourteen times since its first entry in 2007. Armenia achieved its best result in 2010, winning with the song "Mama", performed by Vladimir Arzumanyan. Armenia then hosted the Junior Eurovision Song Contest 2011 in Yerevan.

Despite being included on the final list of participating countries, Armenia withdrew from the 2020 contest in November 2020 due to the then-ongoing Nagorno-Karabakh war. It was later revealed that Maléna had been internally selected to represent Armenia with the song "Why". With the Nagorno-Karabakh war ending on 10 November, Armenia's head of delegation David Tserunyan wrote on Instagram that the country would "come back stronger than ever". Armenia again selected Maléna to represent the country with "Qami Qami", and ultimately won the contest with 224 points.

== Before Junior Eurovision ==
An audition round with 30 shortlisted artists out of over 100 applications was held in August 2022. The participants performed in front of a five-member jury consisting of David Tserunyan (Armenian Head of Delegation in the Junior Eurovision Song Contest), Anushik Ter-Ghukasyan (head of music department at AMPTV), Dalita (Armenian representative in the Junior Eurovision Song Contest 2011), Rosa Linn (Armenian representative in the Eurovision Song Contest 2022) and Lilith Navasardyan (songwriter for multiple Armenian Eurovision entries). On 28 October 2022, AMPTV revealed that Nare Ghazaryan would represent Armenia in the contest. Her entry, "Dance!", written by Grigor Kyokchyan and Nick Egibyan, was presented to the public on 12 November 2022, accompanied by an official music video which was directed by Aramayis Hayrapetyan and produced by Gravity Production.

== At Junior Eurovision ==
After the opening ceremony, which took place on 5 December 2022, it was announced that Armenia would perform fifteenth on 11 December 2022, following Serbia and preceding Ukraine.

=== Voting ===
The same voting system that was introduced in the 2017 edition was used, where the results were determined by 50% online voting and 50% jury voting. Every participating broadcaster assembled a national jury that consisted of three music industry professionals and two children aged between 10 and 15 who were citizens of the country they represented. The rankings of those jurors were combined to make an overall top ten.

The online voting consisted of two phases. The first phase of the online voting began on 9 December 2022 when a recap of all the rehearsal performances was shown on the contest's website Junioreurovision.tv before the viewers could vote. After this, voters also had the option to watch longer one-minute clips from each participant's rehearsal. This first round of voting ended on 11 December at 15:59 CET. The second phase of the online voting took place during the live show and began right after the last performance and was open for 15 minutes. International viewers were able to vote for three songs. They were also able to vote for their own country's song. These votes were then turned into points which were determined by the percentage of votes received. For example, if a song received 10% of the votes, it received 10% of the available points.

Points awarded to Armenia
Score	Country
12 points	France; Kazakhstan; North Macedonia; Spain
10 points	Ireland
8 points	Serbia; Ukraine; United Kingdom
7 points	Portugal
6 points	
5 points	Albania; Georgia; Netherlands
4 points	Malta
3 points	
2 points	Poland
1 point	
Armenia received 70 points from the online vote.

Points awarded by Armenia
Score	Country
12 points	Georgia
10 points	France
8 points	Spain
7 points	Poland
6 points	Netherlands
5 points	United Kingdom
4 points	Portugal
3 points	Malta
2 points	Ireland
1 point	Italy

==== Detailed voting results ====
The following members comprised the Armenian jury:

- David Badalyan (Tokionine)
- Maléna – winner of the Junior Eurovision Song Contest 2021
- Dalita – represented Armenia in the 2011 contest
- Brunette
- Nare Elizbaryan

Detailed voting results from Armenia
Draw	Country	Juror A	Juror B	Juror C	Juror D	Juror E	Rank	Points
01	Netherlands	7	2	3	7	7	5	6
02	Poland	4	5	4	4	5	4	7
03	Kazakhstan	12	9	11	12	13	11	
04	Malta	6	10	13	6	11	8	3
05	Italy	14	6	10	14	10	10	1
06	France	2	4	1	2	4	2	10
07	Albania	15	13	15	15	15	15	
08	Georgia	1	3	5	1	1	1	12
09	Ireland	9	11	8	9	9	9	2
10	North Macedonia	10	12	12	10	14	13	
11	Spain	5	1	2	5	2	3	8
12	United Kingdom	3	7	7	3	6	6	5
13	Portugal	8	8	6	8	3	7	4
14	Serbia	11	15	9	11	12	12	
15	Armenia							
16	Ukraine	13	14	14	13	8	14	
