= Ukraine in the Junior Eurovision Song Contest 2022 =

- Junior Eurovision Song Contest 2022
- Country: Ukraine
- Selection process: National final
- Selection date: 18 September 2022

Competing entry
- Song: "Nezlamna (Unbreakable)"
- Artist: Zlata Dziunka
- Songwriters: Zlata Dziunka; Kateryna Sereda

Placement
- Final result: 9th, 111 points

Participation chronology

Ukraine was represented at the Junior Eurovision Song Contest 2022 in Armenia, which was held on 11 December 2022 in Yerevan. The country was represented by Zlata Dziunka (born 1 December 2008) with the song "Nezlamna (Unbreakable)", who won the national selection organised by the Ukrainian broadcaster Suspilne.

== Background ==
Prior to the 2022 contest, Ukraine had participated in the Junior Eurovision Song Contest fifteen times since its debut in 2006. Ukraine never missed a contest since their debut appearance, and won the contest once in 2012 with the song "Nebo", performed by Anastasiya Petryk. The Ukrainian capital Kyiv has hosted the contest twice, at the Palace of Sports in 2009, and the Palace "Ukraine" in 2013. In the 2021 contest, Olena Usenko represented the country in Paris, France with the song the "Vazhil", placing 6th out of 19 entries with 125 points.

== Before Junior Eurovision ==
=== National final ===
The Ukrainian broadcaster announced on 1 August 2022 that they would be participating at the 2022 contest.

==== Format ====
The final, which took place on 18 September 2022, featured five acts vying to represent Ukraine in Yerevan. The winner was selected via the 50/50 combination of votes from an online vote and an expert jury, the members of which were chosen by the public. The online voting, taking place via Suspilne's official website junioreurovision.ua, was opened on 16 September and closed before the show, and was reopened for 15 minutes after all songs were performed. Both the public televote and the expert jury will assign scores ranging from 1 (lowest) to 5 (highest) and the entry that has the highest number of points following the combination of these scores is declared the winner. In the event of a tie, the jurors were to be tasked with assessing and individually voting for their favourite. The voting for the expert jury was organised via Suspilne's official website junioreurovision.ua. Ten candidates were presented to the public and a voting was open from 30 August to 6 September 2022, with the three candidates topping the online voting being invited to become jurors of the show. All candidates to become expert jurors were:

- Anzhelika Rudnytska – singer, television presenter, Merited Artist of Ukraine
- Darina Krasnovetska – Ukrainian representative in the Junior Eurovision Song Contest 2018
- Khrystyna Soloviy – folk singer-songwriter
- Krutь – singer, bandur player, composer, finalist of Vidbir 2020
- Mykhailo Klymenko – singer-songwriter
- Myroslava Saliy – co-founder of the children's folklore studio "Pravitsa"
- Serhiy Keyn – music journalist, publicist, artist, brand consultant
- Sophia Ivanko – Ukrainian representative in the Junior Eurovision Song Contest 2019
- Tonya Matvienko – singer, Merited Artist of Ukraine
- Vlad Darwin – singer-songwriter

The three selected jury members with the most votes were announced on 13 September 2022. Khrystyna Soloviy was chosen as the head juror, forming the jury panel together with Myroslava Saliy and Anzhelika Rudnytska.

==== Competing entries ====
The submissions for the national selection with original songs from Ukrainian citizens or Ukrainians living in other countries were accepted until 23 August 2022, with participants being required to submit a live performance of their entries recorded on a laptop or telephone without any alterations made to the recording. Five acts were selected from over 50 received submissions to proceed to the final, which were announced on 6 September 2022.

==== Final ====
The final took place on 18 September 2022, hosted by Timur Miroshnychenko in Kyiv and was broadcast on Suspilne Kultura as well as online via Suspilne's Facebook and YouTube channels. The results were determined by a combination of jury and online vote. Due to a tie in the final results, the jurors each voted individually for their winner, with Sofia Artemenko & DJ Polinka receiving 1 vote and Zlata Dziunka receiving 2 votes, therefore winning the final.

Final – 18 September 2022
Draw	Artist	Song	Jury	Online voting	Total	Place
1	Sofia Artemenko & DJ Polinka	"Zamovliannia" (Замовляння)	4	5	9	2
2	Zlata Dziunka	"Nezlamna" (Незламна)	5	4	9	1
3	Yelyzaveta Petruk	"Pisnia pro lelechat" (Пісня про лелечат)	1	2	3	5
4	Daria Rebrova	"Paporoti kvitka" (Папороті квітка)	3	3	6	3
5	Diana Stasiuk	"We Are the Future"	2	1	3	4

== At Junior Eurovision ==
After the opening ceremony, which took place on 5 December 2022, it was announced that Ukraine would perform sixteenth (last) on 11 December 2022, following Armenia.

=== Voting ===
The same voting system that was introduced in the 2017 edition was used, where the results were determined by 50% online voting and 50% jury voting. Every participating broadcaster assembled a national jury that consisted of three music industry professionals and two children aged between 10 and 15 who were citizens of the country they represented. The rankings of those jurors were combined to make an overall top ten.

The online voting consisted of two phases. The first phase of the online voting began on 9 December 2022 when a recap of all the rehearsal performances was shown on the contest's website Junioreurovision.tv before the viewers could vote. After this, voters also had the option to watch longer one-minute clips from each participant's rehearsal. This first round of voting ended on 11 December at 15:59 CET. The second phase of the online voting took place during the live show and began right after the last performance and was open for 15 minutes. International viewers were able to vote for three songs. They were also able to vote for their own country's song. These votes were then turned into points which were determined by the percentage of votes received. For example, if a song received 10% of the votes, it received 10% of the available points.

Points awarded to Ukraine
Score	Country
12 points	
10 points	Kazakhstan
8 points	Portugal
7 points	Poland
6 points	Georgia; Ireland
5 points	
4 points	
3 points	Albania; Malta
2 points	Serbia; United Kingdom
1 point	
Ukraine received 64 points from the online vote.

Points awarded by Ukraine
Score	Country
12 points	United Kingdom
10 points	Georgia
8 points	Armenia
7 points	Ireland
6 points	Poland
5 points	France
4 points	Spain
3 points	Netherlands
2 points	North Macedonia
1 point	Malta

=== Jury selection ===
The members of the Ukrainian jury panel will be selected via a public online vote. Ten candidates were announced on 28 October 2022 and the online vote took place until 2 November 2022 via Suspilne's official website junioreurovision.ua. Based on the results of the vote, the five potential jurors that receive the most votes will be asked to sign to be part of the jury. In the event that a juror is unable to sign the agreement to be on the jury, the juror with the next highest number of votes will be offered the place on the jury. The ultimately chosen jury members are in bold:

Adult jury

- Barleben
- **Khayat**
- MamaRika
- **Victor Bayda**
- **Maksym Nagornyak**
- Tatyana Piskaryova
- Sofia Rol
- Svetlana Tarabarova

Kids' jury

- DJ Polinka
- **Sofia Artemenko**
- Anastasia Doroshenko
- Yelyzaveta Petruk
- **Daria Rebrova**
- Diana Stasiuk

==== Detailed voting results ====
Detailed voting results from Ukraine
Draw	Country	Juror A	Juror B	Juror C	Juror D	Juror E	Rank	Points
01	Netherlands	6	9	6	7	12	8	3
02	Poland	3	8	1	9	5	5	6
03	Kazakhstan	15	15	13	12	15	15	
04	Malta	10	10	9	6	9	10	1
05	Italy	11	13	8	14	13	13	
06	France	7	6	7	8	1	6	5
07	Albania	13	14	11	10	8	12	
08	Georgia	2	1	5	2	7	2	10
09	Ireland	4	4	3	5	4	4	7
10	North Macedonia	12	7	4	13	10	9	2
11	Spain	5	11	10	3	6	7	4
12	United Kingdom	8	3	2	1	3	1	**12**
13	Portugal	9	5	14	15	14	11	
14	Serbia	14	12	15	11	11	14	
15	Armenia	1	2	12	4	2	3	8
16	Ukraine							
