= Kazakhstan in the Junior Eurovision Song Contest 2022 =

- Junior Eurovision Song Contest 2022
- Participating broadcaster: Khabar Agency (KA)
- Country: Kazakhstan
- Selection process: Artist: Baqytty Bala 2022; Song: Internal selection
- Selection date: Artist: 13 August 2022; Song: 6 November 2022

Competing entry
- Song: "Jer-Ana (Mother Earth)"
- Artist: David Charlin
- Songwriters: Khamit Shangaliyev; Serzhan Bakhitzhan; Jordan Arakelyan

Placement
- Final result: 15th, 47 points

Participation chronology

Kazakhstan was represented at the Junior Eurovision Song Contest 2022 with the song "Jer-Ana (Mother Earth)", written by Khamit Shangaliyev, Serzhan Bakhitzhan, and Jordan Arakelyan, and performed by David Charlin. The Kazakh participating broadcaster, Khabar Agency (KA), selected its representative via children's contest Baqytty Bala, and the song internally.

== Background ==
Prior to the 2022 contest, Kazakhstan's highest placing in the contest was in 2019 and 2020, with the song "Armanyńnan qalma" by Yerzhan Maxim and with the song "Forever" by Karakat Bashanova, both achieving second place.

As Khabar Agency (KA) is not an active member of the European Broadcasting Union (EBU), it requires a special invitation from the EBU to participate in Eurovision events. KA was first invited to participate in the Junior Eurovision Song Contest in 2018. Channel 31 had previously expressed their ambitions to debut in the 2018 contest, and had sent a delegation to the 2017 contest.

== Before Junior Eurovision ==
=== Baqytty Bala 2022 ===
Kazakhstan's participation in the 2022 contest was confirmed in August 2022, with KA having been invited to participate by the EBU. Together with the confirmation of participation, it was announced the competing artist would be selected during the international children's contest Baqytty Bala (Kazakh Cyrillic: «Бақытты-бала»; lit. 'Happy Child').

Over 200 artists from Russia, Uzbekistan, Turkey, Ukraine, Poland, Spain, Romania, Azerbaijan, Armenia, Bulgaria and all cities of Kazakhstan applied for the competition. Twenty-one artists from eight countries were selected to participate in the shows, but only Kazakh nationals between the ages of nine and fourteen were eligible for selection, so the nomination to represent Kazakhstan was not awarded automatically to one of the winners, but instead in a separate category, of which the results were determined by a jury consisting of Askhat Mayemirov (director), Marat Aitimov (music teacher), Qanat Aitbayev (founder of Baqytty Bala), Rukhiya Baydukenova (singer) and Yernar Nurtazin (pianist). During the final night held on 13 August 2022 in the Oner Ortalygy Concert Hall in Aktobe, David Charlin was ultimately chosen to represent the country.

=== Song selection ===
In a press conference held in early October vice-president of KA, Daniyar Menilbekov, revealed that the Kazakh entry had been internally selected, and confirmed that one of the composers of the song was Khamit Shangaliyev, who also took part in the creation of the Kazakh entries in 2019 and 2020. The Kazakh entry, "Jer-Ana (Mother Earth)", written by Shangaliyev, Serzhan Bakhitzhan and Jordan Arakelyan, was presented to the public on 6 November 2022, accompanied by an official music video.

== At Junior Eurovision ==
After the opening ceremony, which took place on 5 December 2022, it was announced that Kazakhstan would perform third on 11 December 2022, following Poland and preceding Malta.

At the end of the contest, David Charlin received 47 points, placing Kazakhstan 15th out 16 participating countries. This is the lowest result Kazakhstan had achieved since it first entered the contest.

=== Voting ===
The same voting system that was introduced in the 2017 edition was used, where the results were determined by 50% online voting and 50% jury voting. Every participating broadcaster assembled a national jury that consisted of three music industry professionals and two children aged between 10 and 15 who were citizens of the country they represented. The rankings of those jurors were combined to make an overall top ten.

The online voting consisted of two phases. The first phase of the online voting began on 9 December 2022 when a recap of all the rehearsal performances was shown on the contest's website Junioreurovision.tv before the viewers could vote. After this, voters also had the option to watch longer one-minute clips from each participant's rehearsal. This first round of voting ended on 11 December at 15:59 CET. The second phase of the online voting took place during the live show and began right after the last performance and was open for 15 minutes. International viewers were able to vote for three songs. They were also able to vote for their own country's song. These votes were then turned into points which were determined by the percentage of votes received. For example, if a song received 10% of the votes, it received 10% of the available points.

Points awarded to Kazakhstan
Score	Country
12 points	
10 points	
8 points	
7 points	
6 points	
5 points	
4 points	Italy
3 points	
2 points	
1 point	France
Kazakhstan received 42 points from the online vote.

Points awarded by Kazakhstan
Score	Country
12 points	Armenia
10 points	Ukraine
8 points	France
7 points	Georgia
6 points	Albania
5 points	Portugal
4 points	Italy
3 points	Netherlands
2 points	Spain
1 point	United Kingdom

==== Detailed voting results ====
Detailed voting results from Kazakhstan
Draw	Country	Juror A	Juror B	Juror C	Juror D	Juror E	Rank	Points
01	Netherlands	5	6	10	9	5	8	3
02	Poland	14	15	11	6	10	11	
03	Kazakhstan							
04	Malta	15	13	14	13	12	15	
05	Italy	4	5	6	11	8	7	4
06	France	1	4	7	4	6	3	8
07	Albania	3	2	2	12	11	5	6
08	Georgia	2	11	8	1	4	4	7
09	Ireland	12	12	9	15	7	12	
10	North Macedonia	9	10	15	14	13	13	
11	Spain	13	7	13	5	3	9	2
12	United Kingdom	10	8	4	8	14	10	1
13	Portugal	6	9	5	7	2	6	5
14	Serbia	11	14	12	10	15	14	
15	Armenia	8	1	3	2	1	1	12
16	Ukraine	7	3	1	3	9	2	10
