= Georgia in the Junior Eurovision Song Contest 2022 =

- Junior Eurovision Song Contest 2022
- Country: Georgia
- Selection process: Artist: Ranina 2022; Song: Internal selection
- Selection date: Artist: 18 June 2022; Song: 8 November 2022

Competing entry
- Song: "I Believe"
- Artist: Mariam Bigvava
- Songwriters: Giorgi Kukhianidze; Beni Kdagidze; Iru Khechanovi

Placement
- Final result: 3rd, 161 points

Participation chronology

Georgia was represented at the Junior Eurovision Song Contest 2022 in Armenia, which was held on 11 December 2022 in Yerevan. The children's talent show Ranina was used for the fifth year in a row to select Georgia's representative, Mariam Bigvava.

== Background ==
Prior to the 2022 contest, Georgia had participated in the Junior Eurovision Song Contest fourteen times since its debut in 2007, and since then they have never missed a single contest. Georgia is also the most successful country in the competition, with three victories in 2008, 2011 and 2016. In the 2021 contest, Niko Kajaia represented Georgia with the song "Lets Count The Smiles" following his victory in the fourth season of Ranina, achieving 4th place out of 19 with 163 points.

== Before Junior Eurovision ==
=== Ranina ===
For the fifth year in a row, Georgia used an original children's talent show format, Ranina (Georgian: რანინა), as the selection method for their artist. Georgian broadcaster GPB confirmed that Ranina would be used for the fifth time on 18 November 2021. The list of participants competing in the show was revealed on 3 April 2022, confirming that the show would once again have 10 competitors. On 5 April, GBP announced that Ranina will kick off on Saturday 16 April.

==== Round 1 ====
The shows of round 1 took place on 16 and 23 April 2022. The jurors for this round were Maka Aroshidze, Davit Evgenidze and Tamar Skvitaridze. All contestants except Kato Chkareuli, Oto Bazerashvili and Nini Gazdeliani performed with former Ranina participants, such as: Anastasia Garsevanishvili (2019); Nia Khinchikashvili, Sandra Gadelia, Lela Kveniashvili, Marita Khvedelidze and Rati Gelovani (2020); Barbare Makhatadze and Niko Kajaia (2021).

Show 1 – 16 April 2022
Draw	Artist	Song	Jury scores												Final score
Draw	Artist	Song	M. Aroshidze				D. Evgenidze				T. Skvitaridze				Final score
1	Vache Ghviniashvili	"K’anpet’ebis tovli" (კანფეტების თოვლი)	40				40				39				119
1	Vache Ghviniashvili	"K’anpet’ebis tovli" (კანფეტების თოვლი)	10	10	10	10	10	10	10	10	10	10	10	9	119
2	Kato Chkareuli	"Bavshvobis sizmari" (ბავშვობის სიზმარი)	40				39				39				118
2	Kato Chkareuli	"Bavshvobis sizmari" (ბავშვობის სიზმარი)	10	10	10	10	10	10	9	10	10	9	10	10	118
3	Oto Bazerashvili	"Gazapkhulda" (გაზაფხულდა)	40				40				39				119
3	Oto Bazerashvili	"Gazapkhulda" (გაზაფხულდა)	10	10	10	10	10	10	10	10	9	10	10	10	119
4	Nini Gazdeliani	"Ts’vims" (წვიმს)	40				40				39				119
4	Nini Gazdeliani	"Ts’vims" (წვიმს)	10	10	10	10	10	10	10	10	10	10	9	10	119
5	Alisa Parulava	"Iprinet, iprinet" (იფრინეთ, იფრინეთ)	40				40				40				120
5	Alisa Parulava	"Iprinet, iprinet" (იფრინეთ, იფრინეთ)	10	10	10	10	10	10	10	10	10	10	10	10	120

Show 2 – 23 April 2022
Draw	Artist	Song	Jury scores												Final score
Draw	Artist	Song	M. Aroshidze				D. Evgenidze				T. Skvitaridze				Final score
1	Barbare Kokashvili	"Varsk’vlavebs edzineba" (ვარსკვლავებს ეძინება)	40				40				38				118
1	Barbare Kokashvili	"Varsk’vlavebs edzineba" (ვარსკვლავებს ეძინება)	10	10	10	10	10	10	10	10	10	9	10	9	118
2	Nikoloz Kharati	"Q’va q’va q’vanchala" (ყვა ყვა ყვანჩალა)	40				40				40				120
2	Nikoloz Kharati	"Q’va q’va q’vanchala" (ყვა ყვა ყვანჩალა)	10	10	10	10	10	10	10	10	10	10	10	10	120
3	Mariam Bigvava	"Perebi" (ფერები)	40				40				40				120
3	Mariam Bigvava	"Perebi" (ფერები)	10	10	10	10	10	10	10	10	10	10	10	10	120
4	Ana Kereselidze	"Rvapekha" (რვაფეხა)	40				40				40				120
4	Ana Kereselidze	"Rvapekha" (რვაფეხა)	10	10	10	10	10	10	10	10	10	10	9	10	120
5	Sandro Kvachadze	"Varsk’vlavebit moch’edili tsa" (ვარსკვლავებით მოჭედილი ცა)	40				40				40				120
5	Sandro Kvachadze	"Varsk’vlavebit moch’edili tsa" (ვარსკვლავებით მოჭედილი ცა)	10	10	10	10	10	10	10	10	10	10	10	10	120

==== Round 2 ====
The shows of round 2 took place on 30 April and 7 May 2022. The jurors for this round were Maia Mikarebidze, Davit Evgenidze and Teona Tsiramua.

Show 3 – 30 April 2022
Draw	Artist	Song	Jury scores												Final score
Draw	Artist	Song	M. Mikarebidze				D. Evgenidze				T. Tsiramura				Final score
1	Kato Chkareuli	"T’urpav, T’urpav" (ტურფავ,ტურფავ)	40				40				40				120
1	Kato Chkareuli	"T’urpav, T’urpav" (ტურფავ,ტურფავ)	10	10	10	10	10	10	10	10	10	10	10	10	120
2	Alisa Parulava	"Megrul-apkhazuri suit’a" (მეგრულ-აფხაზური სუიტა)	40				40				40				120
2	Alisa Parulava	"Megrul-apkhazuri suit’a" (მეგრულ-აფხაზური სუიტა)	10	10	10	10	10	10	10	10	10	10	10	10	120
3	Vache Ghviniashvili	"Chum maghnarshi" (ჩუმ მაღნარში)	40				40				40				120
3	Vache Ghviniashvili	"Chum maghnarshi" (ჩუმ მაღნარში)	10	10	10	10	10	10	10	10	10	10	10	10	120
4	Nini Gazdeliani	"Kalakuri simgherebi ishkhnelebis rep’ert’uaridan" (ქალაქური სიმღერები იშხნელების რეპერტუარიდან)	40				40				40				120
4	Nini Gazdeliani	"Kalakuri simgherebi ishkhnelebis rep’ert’uaridan" (ქალაქური სიმღერები იშხნელების რეპერტუარიდან)	10	10	10	10	10	10	10	10	10	10	10	10	120
5	Oto Bazerashvili	"Zamtari" (ზამთარი)	40				40				40				120
5	Oto Bazerashvili	"Zamtari" (ზამთარი)	10	10	10	10	10	10	10	10	10	10	10	10	120

Show 4 – 7 May 2022
Draw	Artist	Song	Jury scores												Final score
Draw	Artist	Song	M. Mikarebidze				D. Evgenidze				T. Tsiramura				Final score
1	Nikoloz Kharati	"Imeruli sat’rpialo" (იმერული სატრფიალო)	40				40				40				120
1	Nikoloz Kharati	"Imeruli sat’rpialo" (იმერული სატრფიალო)	10	10	10	10	10	10	10	10	10	10	10	10	120
2	Ana Kereselidze	"Guruli nana" (გურული ნანა)	40				40				40				120
2	Ana Kereselidze	"Guruli nana" (გურული ნანა)	10	10	10	10	10	10	10	10	10	10	10	10	120
3	Sandro Kvachadze	"Svanuri nana" (სვანური ნანა)	40				40				40				120
3	Sandro Kvachadze	"Svanuri nana" (სვანური ნანა)	10	10	10	10	10	10	10	10	10	10	10	10	120
4	Barbare Kokashvili	"Kutaisuri serenada" (ქუთაისური სერენადა)	40				40				40				120
4	Barbare Kokashvili	"Kutaisuri serenada" (ქუთაისური სერენადა)	10	10	10	10	10	10	10	10	10	10	10	10	120
5	Mariam Bigvava	"Tushuri sat'rpialo suit'a" (თუშური სატრფიალო სუიტა)	40				40				40				120
5	Mariam Bigvava	"Tushuri sat'rpialo suit'a" (თუშური სატრფიალო სუიტა)	10	10	10	10	10	10	10	10	10	10	10	10	120

==== Round 3 ====
The shows of round 3 took place on 14 and 21 May 2022. The jurors for this round were Natalia Kutatelidze, Davit Evgenidze and Liza Bagrationi.

Show 5 – 14 May 2022
Draw	Artist	Song	Jury scores												Final score
Draw	Artist	Song	N. Kutatelidze				D. Evgenidze				L. Bagrationi				Final score
1	Nini Gazdeliani (with Maia Baratashvili )	"Cruella De Vil" (101 Dalmatians)	40				40				40				120
1	Nini Gazdeliani (with Maia Baratashvili )	"Cruella De Vil" (101 Dalmatians)	10	10	10	10	10	10	10	10	10	10	10	10	120
2	Alisa Parulava (with Anri Guchmanidze)	"Love Is an Open Door" (Frozen)	40				40				40				120
2	Alisa Parulava (with Anri Guchmanidze)	"Love Is an Open Door" (Frozen)	10	10	10	10	10	10	10	10	10	10	10	10	120
3	Oto Bazeraishvili (with Duta Skhirtladze)	"Remember Me" (Coco)	40				40				40				120
3	Oto Bazeraishvili (with Duta Skhirtladze)	"Remember Me" (Coco)	10	10	10	10	10	10	10	10	10	10	10	10	120
4	Vache Ghviniashvili (with Helen Kalandadze)	"When We’re Human" (The Princess and the Frog)	40				40				40				120
4	Vache Ghviniashvili (with Helen Kalandadze)	"When We’re Human" (The Princess and the Frog)	10	10	10	10	10	10	10	10	10	10	10	10	120
5	Kato Chkareuli (with Mariko Ebralidze)	"Prince Ali" (Aladdin)	40				40				40				120
5	Kato Chkareuli (with Mariko Ebralidze)	"Prince Ali" (Aladdin)	10	10	10	10	10	10	10	10	10	10	10	10	120

Show 6 – 21 May 2022
Draw	Artist	Song	Jury scores												Final score
Draw	Artist	Song	N. Kutatelidze				D. Evgenidze				L. Bagrationi				Final score
1	Sandro Kvachadze (with Oto Nemsadze )	"Go the Distance" (Hercules)	40				40				40				120
1	Sandro Kvachadze (with Oto Nemsadze )	"Go the Distance" (Hercules)	10	10	10	10	10	10	10	10	10	10	10	10	120
2	Ana Kereselidze (with Bibi Kvachadze)	"The Bare Necessities" (The Jungle Book)	40				40				40				120
2	Ana Kereselidze (with Bibi Kvachadze)	"The Bare Necessities" (The Jungle Book)	10	10	10	10	10	10	10	10	10	10	10	10	120
3	Barbare Kokashvili (with Nodiko Tatishvili)	"A Whole New World" (Aladdin)	40				40				40				120
3	Barbare Kokashvili (with Nodiko Tatishvili)	"A Whole New World" (Aladdin)	10	10	10	10	10	10	10	10	10	10	10	10	120
4	Nikoloz Kharati (with Nutsa Jghamadze)	"Jungle Rhythm" (The Jungle Book 2)	40				40				40				120
4	Nikoloz Kharati (with Nutsa Jghamadze)	"Jungle Rhythm" (The Jungle Book 2)	10	10	10	10	10	10	10	10	10	10	10	10	120
5	Mariam Bigvava (with Sopho Toroshelidze)	"Zero to Hero" (Hercules)	40				40				40				120
5	Mariam Bigvava (with Sopho Toroshelidze)	"Zero to Hero" (Hercules)	10	10	10	10	10	10	10	10	10	10	10	10	120

==== Round 4 ====
The shows of round 4 took place on 28 May and 4 June 2022. The jurors for this round were Buka Kartozia, Davit Evgenidze and Tika Rukhadze.

Show 7 – 28 May 2022
Draw	Artist	Song	Jury scores												Final score
Draw	Artist	Song	B. Kartozia				D. Evgenidze				T. Rukhadze				Final score
1	Nini Gazdeliani	"Le Jouet" (The Toy)	38				40				34				112
1	Nini Gazdeliani	"Le Jouet" (The Toy)	9	10	10	9	10	10	10	10	8	8	9	9	112
2	Kato Chkareuli	"Sakura" (Ikimonogakari)	40				40				37				117
2	Kato Chkareuli	"Sakura" (Ikimonogakari)	10	10	10	10	10	10	10	10	9	9	9	10	117
3	Vache Ghviniashvili	"Eu Sou A Marrom" (Alcione)	40				40				40				120
3	Vache Ghviniashvili	"Eu Sou A Marrom" (Alcione)	10	10	10	10	10	10	10	10	10	10	10	10	120
4	Alisa Parulava	"Eli Eli" (Schindler's List)	40				40				40				120
4	Alisa Parulava	"Eli Eli" (Schindler's List)	10	10	10	10	10	10	10	10	10	10	10	10	120
5	Oto Bazerashvili	"Aman aman ayriliq" (Polad Bulbuloglu)	40				40				40				120
5	Oto Bazerashvili	"Aman aman ayriliq" (Polad Bulbuloglu)	10	10	10	10	10	10	10	10	10	10	10	10	120

Show 8 – 4 June 2022
Draw	Artist	Song	Jury scores												Final score
Draw	Artist	Song	B. Kartozia				D. Evgenidze				T. Rukhadze				Final score
1	Sandro Kvachadze	"Стоїть явір над водою (Stoyitʹ yavir nad vodoyu)" (Ukrainian folk song)	40				40				40				120
1	Sandro Kvachadze	"Стоїть явір над водою (Stoyitʹ yavir nad vodoyu)" (Ukrainian folk song)	10	10	10	10	10	10	10	10	10	10	10	10	120
2	Mariam Bigvava	"Heart's Desire" (The Manhattan Transfer)	40				40				40				120
2	Mariam Bigvava	"Heart's Desire" (The Manhattan Transfer)	10	10	10	10	10	10	10	10	10	10	10	10	120
3	Barbare Kokashvili	"I Girasoli" (Love Theme from Sunflower)	37				40				37				114
3	Barbare Kokashvili	"I Girasoli" (Love Theme from Sunflower)	9	9	10	9	10	10	10	10	9	9	9	10	114
4	Ana Kereselidze	"Chanda Mama Door Ke" (Asha Bhosle)	38				40				39				117
4	Ana Kereselidze	"Chanda Mama Door Ke" (Asha Bhosle)	9	10	10	9	10	10	10	10	9	10	10	10	117
5	Nikoloz Kharati	"Kanach u karmir terevy, ninem ninem/Tonakan par" (Armenian folk music)	40				40				40				120
5	Nikoloz Kharati	"Kanach u karmir terevy, ninem ninem/Tonakan par" (Armenian folk music)	10	10	10	10	10	10	10	10	10	10	10	10	120

===== Semi-final qualification =====
At the end of Show 8, the semi-finalists were announced. The five participants who collected the most points throughout the four tours advanced to the next round. They are Alisa Parulava, Nikoloz Kharati, Mariam Bigvava, Sandro Kvachadze, Vache Ghviniashvili and Oto Bazerashvili. Vache Ghviniashvili and Oto Bazerashvili both took 5th place with the same score, so both of them qualified to the semi-final round.

Semi-final qualification
Artist	Round 1			Round 2			Round 3			Round 4			Total	Result
Alisa Parulava	120			120			120			120			480	Semi-finalist
Alisa Parulava	40	40	40	40	40	40	40	40	40	40	40	40	480	Semi-finalist
Ana Kereselidze	120			120			120			117			477	Eliminated
Ana Kereselidze	40	40	40	40	40	40	40	40	40	38	40	39	477	Eliminated
Barbare Kokashvili	118			120			120			114			472	Eliminated
Barbare Kokashvili	40	40	38	40	40	40	40	40	40	37	40	37	472	Eliminated
Vache Ghviniashvili	119			120			120			120			479	Semi-finalist
Vache Ghviniashvili	40	40	39	40	40	40	40	40	40	40	40	40	479	Semi-finalist
Kato Chkareuli	118			120			120			117			475	Eliminated
Kato Chkareuli	40	39	39	40	40	40	40	40	40	40	40	37	475	Eliminated
Mariam Bigvava	120			120			120			120			480	Semi-finalist
Mariam Bigvava	40	40	40	40	40	40	40	40	40	40	40	40	480	Semi-finalist
Nini Gazdeliani	119			120			120			112			471	Eliminated
Nini Gazdeliani	40	40	39	40	40	40	40	40	40	38	40	34	471	Eliminated
Oto Bazerashvili	119			120			120			120			479	Semi-finalist
Oto Bazerashvili	40	40	39	40	40	40	40	40	40	40	40	40	479	Semi-finalist
Sandro Kvachadze	120			120			120			120			480	Semi-finalist
Sandro Kvachadze	40	40	40	40	40	40	40	40	40	40	40	40	480	Semi-finalist
Nikoloz Kharati	120			120			120			120			480	Semi-finalist
Nikoloz Kharati	40	40	40	40	40	40	40	40	40	40	40	40	480	Semi-finalist

==== Semi-final ====
The semi-final took place on 11 June 2022. The jurors for this round were Dato Tsintsadze, Davit Evgenidze and Nato Metonidze. At the end of the semi-final, the finalists were announced. For the first time in the history of Ranina, four finalists were selected instead of the usual three.

Semi-final – 11 June 2022
Draw	Artist	Song	Result
1	Oto Bazerashvili (with Kai Ambavi)	"Ch’rel Baghdadze" (ჭრელ ბაღდადზე)	Finalist
2	Sandro Kvachadze (with Kai Ambavi)	"Ch’q’int’i Q’velis Ch’ama Miq’vars" (ჭყინტი ყველის ჭამა მიყვარს)	Eliminated
3	Alisa Parulava (with Kai Ambavi)	"Dila Aris Tsalazhvardi" (დილა არის ცალაჟვარდი)	Eliminated
4	Vache Ghviniashvili (with Kai Ambavi)	"Gogo Midis Mokhveulshi" (გოგო მიდის მოხვეულში)	Finalist
5	Mariam Bigvava (with Kai Ambavi)	"Apkhazuri Panki" (აფხაზური ფანქი)	Finalist
6	Nikoloz Kharati (with Kai Ambavi)	"Ach’aruli" (აჭარული)	Finalist

==== Final ====
The final took place on 18 June 2022. The jurors for the final were Beka Gochiashvili, Davit Evgenidze and Nato Metonidze.

Final – 18 June 2022
Draw	Artist	Song
1	Nikoloz Kharati	"Shenze pikrebs bedavs guli tavkhedi" (შენზე ფიქრებს ბედავს გული თავხედი)
2	Vache Ghviniashvili	"P’ank’esas simghera" (პანკესას სიმღერა)
3	Oto Bazerashvili	"P’avles simghera" (პავლეს სიმღერა)
4	Mariam Bigvava	"Asetia es tskhovreba" (ასეთია ეს ცხოვრება)

=== Preparation ===
On 29 October 2022, GPB reported from the filming of the music video for Mariam's song, featuring four dancers.

== At Junior Eurovision ==
After the opening ceremony, which took place on 5 December 2022, it was announced that Georgia would perform eighth on 11 December 2022, following Albania and preceding Ireland.

=== Voting ===
The same voting system that was introduced in the 2017 edition was used, where the results were determined by 50% online voting and 50% jury voting. Every participating broadcaster assembled a national jury that consisted of three music industry professionals and two children aged between 10 and 15 who were citizens of the country they represented. The rankings of those jurors were combined to make an overall top ten.

The online voting consisted of two phases. The first phase of the online voting began on 9 December 2022 when a recap of all the rehearsal performances was shown on the contest's website Junioreurovision.tv before the viewers could vote. After this, voters also had the option to watch longer one-minute clips from each participant's rehearsal. This first round of voting ended on 11 December at 15:59 CET. The second phase of the online voting took place during the live show and began right after the last performance and was open for 15 minutes. International viewers were able to vote for three songs. They were also able to vote for their own country's song. These votes were then turned into points which were determined by the percentage of votes received. For example, if a song received 10% of the votes, it received 10% of the available points.

Points awarded to Georgia
Score	Country
12 points	Armenia; Poland
10 points	Italy; Portugal; Spain; Ukraine
8 points	Netherlands; North Macedonia
7 points	Kazakhstan; Serbia
6 points	Malta
5 points	France; United Kingdom
4 points	
3 points	
2 points	Albania; Ireland
1 point	
Georgia received 47 points from the online vote.

Points awarded by Georgia
Score	Country
12 points	Italy
10 points	France
8 points	United Kingdom
7 points	Portugal
6 points	Ukraine
5 points	Armenia
4 points	Albania
3 points	Serbia
2 points	Ireland
1 point	Spain

==== Detailed voting results ====
Detailed voting results from Georgia
Draw	Country	Juror A	Juror B	Juror C	Juror D	Juror E	Rank	Points
01	Netherlands	9	15	13	15	12	15	
02	Poland	11	14	12	13	7	14	
03	Kazakhstan	15	6	10	14	13	12	
04	Malta	14	13	9	9	9	11	
05	Italy	1	1	1	1	6	1	12
06	France	2	2	5	2	2	2	10
07	Albania	13	9	6	8	8	7	4
08	Georgia							
09	Ireland	7	10	11	12	10	9	2
10	North Macedonia	10	11	8	11	15	13	
11	Spain	6	12	14	10	14	10	1
12	United Kingdom	4	3	2	4	1	3	8
13	Portugal	3	5	4	5	5	4	7
14	Serbia	12	7	15	7	11	8	3
15	Armenia	8	8	3	6	3	6	5
16	Ukraine	5	4	7	3	4	5	6
