= Spain in the Junior Eurovision Song Contest 2022 =

- Junior Eurovision Song Contest 2022
- Participating broadcaster: Radiotelevisión Española (RTVE)
- Country: Spain
- Selection process: Internal selection
- Announcement date: Artist: 3 October 2022; Song: 3 November 2022

Competing entry
- Song: "Señorita"
- Artist: Carlos Higes
- Songwriters: Carlos Higes; Will Taylor; Primož Poglajen; Michael James Down

Placement
- Final result: 6th, 137 points

Participation chronology

Spain was represented at the Junior Eurovision Song Contest 2022 with the song "Señorita", written by Carlos Higes, Will Taylor, Primož Poglajen, and Michael James Down, and performed by Higes himself. The Spanish participating broadcaster, Radiotelevisión Española (RTVE), internally selected its entry for the contest.

== Background ==
Prior to the 2022 contest, Televisión Española (TVE) until 2006, and Radiotelevisión Española (RTVE) since 2019, had participated in the Junior Eurovision Song Contest representing Spain seven times since TVE's debut in the inaugural edition. They won in 2004 with the song "Antes muerta que sencilla", performed by María Isabel. In 2021, "Reír" by Levi Díaz achieved 15th place out of 19 entries with 77 points.

== Before Junior Eurovision ==
For the first time since 2006, RTVE opted to use an open selection process to pick its representative. An assessment committee made up of RTVE professionals created a shortlist from the 95 submissions received between mid-August and September to perform in the second phase, a live casting held in Madrid. Carlos Higes was announced as the selected artist during the broadcast of MasterChef Celebrity on 3 October 2022.

== At Junior Eurovision ==
After the opening ceremony, which took place on 5 December 2022, it was announced that Spain would perform eleventh on 11 December 2022, following North Macedonia and preceding United Kingdom.

=== Voting ===
The same voting system that was introduced in the 2017 edition was used, where the results were determined by 50% online voting and 50% jury voting. Every participating broadcaster assembled a national jury that consisted of three music industry professionals and two children aged between 10 and 15 who were citizens of the country they represented. The rankings of those jurors were combined to make an overall top ten.

The online voting consisted of two phases. The first phase of the online voting began on 9 December 2022 when a recap of all the rehearsal performances was shown on the contest's website Junioreurovision.tv before the viewers could vote. After this, voters also had the option to watch longer one-minute clips from each participant's rehearsal. This first round of voting ended on 11 December at 15:59 CET. The second phase of the online voting took place during the live show and began right after the last performance and was open for 15 minutes. International viewers were able to vote for three songs. They were also able to vote for their own country's song. These votes were then turned into points which were determined by the percentage of votes received. For example, if a song received 10% of the votes, it received 10% of the available points.

At the end of the voting, Spain finished in sixth place, coming in sixth with 59 points in the jury vote (including a maximum twelve points from the United Kingdom; Spain was also one of only two countries, along with Georgia, that managed to earn points from every national jury other than their own) and second with 78 points in the online vote. Spain awarded their twelve points to the host country, Armenia.

Points awarded to Spain
Score	Country
12 points	United Kingdom
10 points	Malta
8 points	Armenia
7 points	
6 points	
5 points	North Macedonia
4 points	Albania; France; Ukraine
3 points	Netherlands
2 points	Kazakhstan; Portugal
1 point	Georgia; Ireland; Italy; Poland; Serbia
Spain received 78 points from the online vote.

Points awarded by Spain
Score	Country
12 points	Armenia
10 points	Georgia
8 points	Netherlands
7 points	Portugal
6 points	France
5 points	Malta
4 points	United Kingdom
3 points	Ireland
2 points	Poland
1 point	Serbia

==== Detailed voting results ====
Detailed voting results from Spain
Draw	Country	Juror A	Juror B	Juror C	Juror D	Juror E	Rank	Points
01	Netherlands	2	3	4	3	3	3	8
02	Poland	13	5	10	14	7	9	2
03	Kazakhstan	14	15	14	15	14	15	
04	Malta	9	6	5	4	8	6	5
05	Italy	8	14	9	9	13	12	
06	France	4	7	2	8	4	5	6
07	Albania	7	8	13	11	15	11	
08	Georgia	5	2	1	2	1	2	10
09	Ireland	11	13	8	5	9	8	3
10	North Macedonia	15	11	15	12	12	14	
11	Spain							
12	United Kingdom	6	12	7	13	6	7	4
13	Portugal	1	4	6	6	5	4	7
14	Serbia	10	9	12	7	11	10	1
15	Armenia	3	1	3	1	2	1	12
16	Ukraine	12	10	11	10	10	13	
