= Malta in the Junior Eurovision Song Contest 2022 =

- Junior Eurovision Song Contest 2022
- Participating broadcaster: Public Broadcasting Services (PBS)
- Country: Malta
- Selection process: Malta Junior Eurovision Song Contest 2022
- Selection date: 2 October 2022

Competing entry
- Song: "Diamonds in the Skies"
- Artist: Gaia Gambuzza
- Songwriter: Matthew James Borg

Placement
- Final result: 16th, 43 points

Participation chronology

Malta was represented at the Junior Eurovision Song Contest 2022 with the song "Diamonds in the Skies", written by Matthew James Borg and performed by Gaia Gambuzza. The Maltese participating broadcaster, Public Broadcasting Services (PBS), organised a national final to select its entry for the contest.

== Background ==
Prior to the 2022 contest, Malta had participated in the Junior Eurovision Song Contest sixteen times since their first participation in the inaugural 2003 contest. Malta participated in every contest, with the exception of the 2011 and 2012 contests. Malta has won the contest twice: in 2013 with "The Start" performed by Gaia Cauchi, and in 2015 with "Not My Soul" performed by Destiny Chukunyere. In the 2021 contest, Malta was represented by the song "My Home" performed by Ike and Kaya. The song placed 12th out of 19 entries with 97 points.

== Before Junior Eurovision ==
=== Malta Junior Eurovision Song Contest 2022 ===
Public Broadcasting Services (PBS) participation in the contest was confirmed in June 2022. PBS organised the national final Malta Junior Eurovision Song Contest 2022 to select the Maltese entry.

==== Competing entries ====
Artists and songwriters were able to submit their entries between 24 June 2022 and 15 August 2022. For the preliminary selection, PBS nominated a professional jury, which judged the studio versions of all submissions. While applicants can submit more than one song, only one submission per lead artist can make the final participant list, unlike the previous edition. The final list of participants was revealed on 1 September 2022.

Artist	Song	Songwriter(s)
Aaliyah Cassar	"Infinity"	Muxu, Cyprian Cassar
Andrea Camilleri	"Spark"	Philippa Naudi, Bettina Muchmore
Cassidy Gauci	"Light Up"	Emil Calleja Bayliss, Dario Bezzina
Cesca Galea	"See the Invisible"	Aldo Spiteri, Bradley Spiteri
Charelle Micallef	"The Extra Mile"	Emil Calleja Bayliss, Aldo Spiteri, Bradley Spiteri
Emma Kate Formosa	"Bounce"	Emil Calleja Bayliss, Philip Vella
Gaia Gambuzza	"Diamonds in the Skies"	Matthew James Borg
Geneve	"With You by My Side"	Genève Dimech, Maria Abdilla
Isis Jade Miller	"Unbreakable"	Christina Magrin
Kayleen	"Shooting Star"	Rita Pace, Aldo Spiteri, Bradley Spiteri
Kaylyn Mallia	"Here I Am"	Christina Magrin
Kensley Ciappara	"Tliet Xadini"	Emil Calleja Bayliss, Kaya
Ma Girlz	"Stereo"	Dana McKeon
Naomi Busuttil	"Little Cheeky"	Emil Calleja Bayliss, Kaya
Rih and Bri	"Karma"	Aidan Cassar, Cyprian Cassar
Shanzay Mangion	"Heartbeat"	Emil Calleja Bayliss, Elton Zarb

==== Final ====
The final took place on 2 October 2022 at the Rediffusion House in Gwardamanġa, hosted by Ryan and Josmar . The winner was selected by the votes of a jury panel (75%) and public televoting (25%). The jury consisted of singer Mary Rose Mallia, Maltese Eurovision Song Contest 1997 entrant Debbie Scerri, Maltese Eurovision Song Contest 2004 entrant Ludwig Galea and presenter Roderick Azzopardi Custo. The interval act featured performances by former Maltese Junior Eurovision entrants Eliana Gomez Blanco (2019), Gianluca Cilia (2017), and Ike and Kaya (2021). "Diamonds in the Skies" performed by Gaia Gambuzza was announced as the winner of the national final.

Final – 2 October 2022
R/O	Artist	Song	Place
1	Emma Kate Formosa	"Bounce"	3
2	Naomi Busuttil	"Little Cheeky"	—N/a
3	Cassidy Gauci	"Light Up"	—N/a
4	Kaylyn Mallia	"Here I Am"	—N/a
5	Aaliyah Cassar	"Infinity"	—N/a
6	Cesca Galea	"See the Invisible"	—N/a
7	Isis Jade Miller	"Unbreakable"	—N/a
8	Shanzay Mangion	"Heartbeat"	—N/a
9	Geneve	"With You by My Side"	—N/a
10	Ma Girlz	"Stereo"	—N/a
11	Kensley Ciappara	"Tliet Xadini"	—N/a
12	Charelle Micallef	"The Extra Mile"	—N/a
13	Andrea Camilleri	"Spark"	2
14	Rih and Bri	"Karma"	—N/a
15	Kayleen	"Shooting Star"	—N/a
16	Gaia Gambuzza	"Diamonds in the Skies"	1

== At Junior Eurovision ==
After the opening ceremony, which took place on 5 December 2022, it was announced that Malta would perform fourth on 11 December 2022, following Kazakhstan and preceding Italy.

=== Voting ===
The same voting system that was introduced in the 2017 edition was used, where the results were determined by 50% online voting and 50% jury voting. Every participating broadcaster assembled a national jury that consisted of three music industry professionals and two children aged between 10 and 15 who were citizens of the country they represented. The rankings of those jurors were combined to make an overall top ten.

The online voting consisted of two phases. The first phase of the online voting began on 9 December 2022 when a recap of all the rehearsal performances was shown on the contest's website Junioreurovision.tv before the viewers could vote. After this, voters also had the option to watch longer one-minute clips from each participant's rehearsal. This first round of voting ended on 11 December at 15:59 CET. The second phase of the online voting took place during the live show and began right after the last performance and was open for 15 minutes. International viewers were able to vote for three songs. They were also able to vote for their own country's song. These votes were then turned into points which were determined by the percentage of votes received. For example, if a song received 10% of the votes, it received 10% of the available points.

Points awarded to Malta
Score	Country
12 points	
10 points	
8 points	
7 points	
6 points	
5 points	Spain
4 points	
3 points	Armenia
2 points	
1 point	Albania; Ukraine
Malta received 33 points from the online vote.

Points awarded by Malta
Score	Country
12 points	Ireland
10 points	Spain
8 points	Netherlands
7 points	Albania
6 points	Georgia
5 points	Poland
4 points	Armenia
3 points	Ukraine
2 points	Italy
1 point	United Kingdom

==== Detailed voting results ====
Detailed voting results from Malta
Draw	Country	Juror A	Juror B	Juror C	Juror D	Juror E	Rank	Points
01	Netherlands	5	6	1	1	7	3	8
02	Poland	8	1	4	10	8	6	5
03	Kazakhstan	14	10	11	12	11	12	
04	Malta							
05	Italy	10	15	7	5	10	9	2
06	France	15	9	9	15	13	13	
07	Albania	4	8	8	2	4	4	7
08	Georgia	7	2	10	7	3	5	6
09	Ireland	2	3	2	3	2	1	12
10	North Macedonia	12	13	14	13	15	15	
11	Spain	1	7	3	6	1	2	10
12	United Kingdom	13	4	13	9	12	10	1
13	Portugal	11	14	12	14	14	14	
14	Serbia	9	12	15	11	9	11	
15	Armenia	6	5	5	4	6	7	4
16	Ukraine	3	11	6	8	5	8	3
