= Italy in the Junior Eurovision Song Contest 2022 =

- Junior Eurovision Song Contest 2022
- Country: Italy
- Selection process: Internal selection
- Announcement date: 3 November 2022

Competing entry
- Song: "Bla Bla Bla"
- Artist: Chanel Dilecta
- Songwriters: Carmine Spera; Fabrizio Palaferri; Angela Senatore; Marco Iardella

Placement
- Final result: 11th, 95 points

Participation chronology

Italy was represented at the Junior Eurovision Song Contest 2022 in Yerevan, Armenia. Italian broadcaster RAI is responsible for the country's participation in the contest. Chanel Dilecta represented Italy with the song "Bla Bla Bla".

== Background ==
Prior to the 2022 contest, Italy had participated in the Junior Eurovision Song Contest seven times since its debut in 2014, having won the contest on their first appearance with the song "Tu primo grande amore", performed by Vincenzo Cantiello. On the country's most recent appearance, in 2021, the Italian broadcaster internally selected Elisabetta Lizza to represent Italy at the contest with the song "Specchio (Mirror on the Wall)". She achieved tenth place with 107 points.

Italy withdrew from the 2020 contest due to the COVID-19 pandemic, and despite initially announcing that they would not return in 2021, they ultimately announced their participation in the 2021 contest in France.

== Before Junior Eurovision ==
On 3 November 2022, RAI announced that 13-year-old Chanel Dilecta will represent Italy with the song "Bla Bla Bla". The song and music video were released a week later.

== At Junior Eurovision ==
After the opening ceremony, which took place on 5 December 2022, it was announced that Italy would perform fifth on 11 December 2022, following Malta and preceding France.

=== Voting ===
The same voting system that was introduced in the 2017 edition was used, where the results were determined by 50% online voting and 50% jury voting. Every participating broadcaster assembled a national jury that consisted of three music industry professionals and two children aged between 10 and 15 who were citizens of the country they represented. The rankings of those jurors were combined to make an overall top ten.

The online voting consisted of two phases. The first phase of the online voting began on 9 December 2022 when a recap of all the rehearsal performances was shown on the contest's website Junioreurovision.tv before the viewers could vote. After this, voters also had the option to watch longer one-minute clips from each participant's rehearsal. This first round of voting ended on 11 December at 15:59 CET. The second phase of the online voting took place during the live show and began right after the last performance and was open for 15 minutes. International viewers were able to vote for three songs. They were also able to vote for their own country's song. These votes were then turned into points which were determined by the percentage of votes received. For example, if a song received 10% of the votes, it received 10% of the available points.

Points awarded to Italy
Score	Country
12 points	Albania; Georgia
10 points	
8 points	
7 points	
6 points	Portugal
5 points	
4 points	Kazakhstan
3 points	Serbia
2 points	France; Malta
1 point	Armenia
Italy received 53 points from the online vote.

Points awarded by Italy
Score	Country
12 points	France
10 points	Georgia
8 points	United Kingdom
7 points	Portugal
6 points	Ireland
5 points	Poland
4 points	Kazakhstan
3 points	Albania
2 points	Serbia
1 point	Spain

==== Detailed voting results ====
Detailed voting results from Italy
Draw	Country	Juror A	Juror B	Juror C	Juror D	Juror E	Rank	Points
01	Netherlands	6	12	9	11	9	11	
02	Poland	4	3	3	12	11	6	5
03	Kazakhstan	13	10	10	2	3	7	4
04	Malta	12	14	12	13	13	15	
05	Italy							
06	France	2	1	1	8	2	1	12
07	Albania	8	5	8	4	10	8	3
08	Georgia	1	2	2	6	8	2	10
09	Ireland	7	6	7	3	4	5	6
10	North Macedonia	15	15	6	9	7	12	
11	Spain	9	13	14	5	6	10	1
12	United Kingdom	3	4	4	7	5	3	8
13	Portugal	14	8	11	1	1	4	7
14	Serbia	5	7	5	15	12	9	2
15	Armenia	10	11	13	10	15	13	
16	Ukraine	11	9	15	14	14	14	
