= United Kingdom in the Junior Eurovision Song Contest 2022 =

- Junior Eurovision Song Contest 2022
- Participating broadcaster: British Broadcasting Corporation (BBC)
- Country: United Kingdom
- Selection process: Internal selection
- Announcement date: 3 November 2022

Competing entry
- Song: "Lose My Head"
- Artist: Freya Skye
- Songwriters: Deepend; Jack Hawitt; Amber van Day

Placement
- Final result: 5th, 146 points

Participation chronology

The United Kingdom was represented at the Junior Eurovision Song Contest 2022 with the song "Lose My Head", written by Deepend, Jack Hawitt, and Amber van Day, and performed by Freya Skye. The British participating broadcaster, the British Broadcasting Corporation (BBC), internally selected its entry for the contest. On 25 August 2022, the BBC announced that it would participate in the contest for the first time, after a sixteen-year absence of the United Kingdom, replacing ITV, who had previously participated representing the country between 2003 and 2005.

Skye performed twelfth in the running order, following the entry from Spain and preceding the entry from Portugal. The United Kingdom placed fifth with 146 points, winning the online vote with 80 points.

== Background ==
Prior to the 2022 contest, ITV had participated in the Junior Eurovision Song Contest representing the United Kingdom three times since its first entry in the inaugural contest in 2003, with its best result being in 2004 when it finished in second position with the song "The Best is Yet to Come", performed by Cory Spedding. ITV was due to host the event in Manchester in 2004, but pulled out due to financial and scheduling issues. In the 2005 contest, Joni Fuller represented the country with the song "How Does It Feel?". The song ended 14th out of 16 entries with 28 points.

ITV withdrew from the Junior Eurovision Song Contest in 2006, after poor viewing figures in 2004 and 2005. Sianel Pedwar Cymru (S4C) took part representing Wales independently in the 2018 and 2019 contests. Until 2020, neither ITV nor the British Broadcasting Corporation (BBC) expressed any interest in returning to the contest, until the BBC expressed an interest in returning for the 2020 contest. The UK did not appear on the official list of participants as released by the European Broadcasting Union (EBU) on 8 September 2020. At a Junior Eurovision press event in May 2021, the EBU stated that they were working to bring the UK back to the contest, possibly for the 2021 edition. However, once again the UK did not appear on the final list of participants for the contest. On 17 December 2021, at a press conference between France Télévisions and the executive supervisor of the Junior Eurovision Song Contest Martin Österdahl, Österdahl stated that he was positive about talks between the EBU and the BBC about a potential UK return. On 25 August 2022, it was confirmed that the UK would return for the 2022 contest in Yerevan, with the BBC replacing ITV as the British participating broadcaster.

== Before Junior Eurovision ==
Upon the broadcaster's announcement that they would participate in the Junior Eurovision Song Contest 2022, Patricia Hidalgo Reina, director of BBC Children's and Education, stated:

"We are beyond excited to bring the Junior Eurovision Song Contest to the BBC for the first time, and to showcase the diverse young musical talent from across Europe for children and their families to discover and enjoy together. This junior version of Eurovision will undoubtedly encapsulate the same spirit of unity that the adult contest brings, reflecting the heart of what CBBC is all about, an inclusive channel that celebrates the diversity and creativity in all children. I can’t wait to unveil our own musical talent who will proudly represent the UK."

— Patricia Hidalgo Reina

The song representing the United Kingdom had been chosen by the British head of delegation, Lee Smithurst, out of a pool of shortlisted songs, and CBBC, together with BBC Studios Entertainment and Music, who were tasked with selecting a singer in co-operation with the British commercial talent agency Buzz Kids. In order to select the British artist to the 2022 contest in Yerevan, a two-stage audition process was held, which commenced in September 2022 and forty artists were invited to attend. The first stage involved all artists singing a cover song of their choice and an original song, of which eight were selected to progress to the second stage. The second stage involved the remaining eight artists performing the selected entry "Lose My Head". A jury panel consisting of music professionals determined the winner of the auditions and, hence who would represent the United Kingdom at the Junior Eurovision Song Contest 2022.

On 3 November 2022, it was officially revealed to the public that Freya Skye would represent the country with the song "Lose My Head", written by Deepend, Jack Hawitt and Amber van Day. Skye went to the Apollo Victoria Theatre in London under the pretext of a final audition, only to be surprised by West End Theatre performer and the UK's 2017 Eurovision entrant Lucie Jones, who broke the news to Skye that she had been selected to represent the UK in Armenia.

=== Preparation and promotion ===
Dan Shipton, who had designed several previous Eurovision stagings, including for Sam Ryder, the British runner-up for the United Kingdom in the Eurovision Song Contest 2022, was again the creative director, while Jay Revell was the lead choreographer and Jorge Antonio was the assistant choreographer and costume designer for the performance. Annabel Williams was Skye’s lead vocal coach, having previously coached Sam Ryder and James Newman for the UK at the Eurovision Song Contest and having experience as the lead vocal coach on The X Factor UK and Britain’s Got Talent. Williams has also worked alongside the likes of Amy Winehouse and Jennifer Hudson.

Following the reveal of the UK entry, Skye embarked on several promotional activities, appearing on BBC Breakfast and The Zoe Ball Breakfast Show on BBC Radio 2 on 3 November. Skye also appeared on CBBC’s Newsround, BBC Radio 5 Live and Fun Kids. On 18 November, Skye gave her first live TV performance of "Lose My Head" on the BBC's annual charity appeal show Children in Need. On 26 November, Skye performed live on CBBC's Saturday Mash-Up! and three days later on BBC Two's Strictly Come Dancing: It Takes Two. On 8 December, CBBC broadcast a 30-minute documentary Freya's Journey, which followed her journey to the contest.

== At Junior Eurovision ==
The Junior Eurovision Song Contest 2022 took place at the Karen Demirchyan Sports and Concerts Complex in Yerevan, Armenia on 11 December 2022, at 15:00 GMT. The event was broadcast live on CBBC, BBC One and on the BBC iPlayer. On 21 November, it was announced that children's TV presenter Lauren Layfield and singer Hrvy would commentate the BBC's coverage of the contest from MediaCity in Salford. The spokesperson, who revealed the top twelve-point score of the British jury, was Tabitha Joy.

Skye and the UK delegation also participated in the Opening Ceremony for the contest, which was held in Republic Square in Yerevan on 5 December, during which the running order was also determined. The United Kingdom was drawn by the show producers to perform in 12th position, following the entry from Spain and preceding the entry from Portugal.

Just over 700,000 watched Junior Eurovision in the UK, an audience size similar to when ITV last participated in 2005. 5,200,000 viewers watched live on the BBC for at least one minute.

=== Rehearsals ===
Due to Freya falling ill during the week, she was unable to sing live during her second rehearsal, using playback instead, and pulled out of the jury show on 10 December, as doctors had advised her to rest her voice.

=== Performance ===
The live performance for the UK entry in Yerevan featured similarities to the music video for the song, with Freya joined by four backing dancers, all of whom wore red dresses. A large custom-made throne, along with Alice in Wonderland-inspired LEDs, red lighting, and pyrotechnics made up the staging.

Dan Shipton, who had designed several previous Eurovision stagings, including for Sam Ryder, the British runner-up for the United Kingdom in the Eurovision Song Contest 2022, was again the creative director, while Jay Revell was the lead choreographer and Jorge Antonio was the assistant choreographer and costume designer for the performance. Annabel Williams was Skye’s lead vocal coach, having previously coached Sam Ryder and James Newman for the UK at the Eurovision Song Contest and having experience as the lead vocal coach on The X Factor UK and Britain’s Got Talent. Williams has also worked alongside the likes of Amy Winehouse and Jennifer Hudson.

=== Voting ===
The same voting system that was introduced in the 2017 edition was used, where the results were determined by 50% online voting and 50% jury voting. Every participating broadcaster assembled a national jury that consisted of three music industry professionals and two children aged between 10 and 15 who were citizens of the country they represented. The rankings of those jurors were combined to make an overall top ten.

The online voting consisted of two phases. The first phase of the online voting began on 9 December 2022 when a recap of all the rehearsal performances was shown on the contest's website Junioreurovision.tv before the viewers could vote. After this, voters also had the option to watch longer one-minute clips from each participant's rehearsal. This first round of voting ended on 11 December at 15:59 CET. The second phase of the online voting took place during the live show and began right after the last performance and was open for 15 minutes. International viewers were able to vote for three songs. They were also able to vote for their own country's song. These votes were then turned into points which were determined by the percentage of votes received. For example, if a song received 10% of the votes, it received 10% of the available points.

The United Kingdom received 66 points from the professional juries, placing in fifth position. The country placed first in the online vote, with 80 points. Overall, the United Kingdom placed in fifth place with 146 points, receiving maximum twelve points from Ukraine in the jury vote.

Points awarded to the United Kingdom
Score	Country
12 points	Ukraine
10 points	
8 points	Georgia; Italy
7 points	France
6 points	Albania; Netherlands
5 points	Armenia
4 points	Spain
3 points	Poland; Portugal
2 points	North Macedonia
1 point	Kazakhstan; Malta
The United Kingdom received 80 points from the online vote.

Points awarded by the United Kingdom
Score	Country
12 points	Spain
10 points	France
8 points	Armenia
7 points	Netherlands
6 points	Ireland
5 points	Georgia
4 points	Albania
3 points	Serbia
2 points	Ukraine
1 point	Portugal

==== Detailed voting results ====
Each nation's jury consisted of five members: three adult music industry professionals and two children, who are citizens of the country they represent. This jury judged each entry based on: vocal capacity; the stage performance; the song's composition and originality; and the overall impression by the act. In addition, no member of a national jury was permitted to be related in any way to any of the competing acts in such a way that they cannot vote impartially and independently. The individual rankings of each jury member were released shortly after the contest.

Detailed voting results from the United Kingdom
Draw	Country	Juror A	Juror B	Juror C	Juror D	Juror E	Rank	Points
01	Netherlands	5	11	3	4	2	4	7
02	Poland	7	9	15	3	9	11	
03	Kazakhstan	15	12	14	14	12	14	
04	Malta	13	10	9	11	11	12	
05	Italy	14	14	13	13	15	15	
06	France	1	4	12	8	1	2	10
07	Albania	11	5	1	9	10	7	4
08	Georgia	3	8	11	1	14	6	5
09	Ireland	8	1	8	5	6	5	6
10	North Macedonia	12	13	6	15	13	13	
11	Spain	4	2	10	2	4	1	12
12	United Kingdom							
13	Portugal	6	15	5	12	5	10	1
14	Serbia	10	6	2	10	7	8	3
15	Armenia	2	7	4	6	3	3	8
16	Ukraine	9	3	7	7	8	9	2
