= Ireland in the Junior Eurovision Song Contest 2022 =

- Junior Eurovision Song Contest 2022
- Country: Ireland
- Selection process: Artist: Junior Eurovision Éire 2022; Song: Internal selection
- Selection date: Heats; 18 September 2022; 25 September 2022; 2 October 2022; 9 October 2022; Semi-Final; 16 October 2022; Final; 23 October 2022; Song; 8 November 2022

Competing entry
- Song: "Solas"
- Artist: Sophie Lennon
- Songwriters: Jonas Gladnikoff; Matthew Ker; Hannah Featherstone; Ken McHugh; Niall Mooney

Placement
- Final result: 4th, 150 points

Participation chronology

Ireland was represented at the Junior Eurovision Song Contest 2022, which was held on 11 December 2022 in Yerevan, Armenia. Irish broadcaster TG4 selected Sophie Lennon to represent the country through the televised national final Junior Eurovision Éire, with the competing song "Solas" being internally selected. Being from County Down, Lennon was the first singer from Northern Ireland to compete at Junior Eurovision.

== Background ==
Prior to the 2022 contest, Ireland had participated in the Junior Eurovision Song Contest six times since its debut in 2015. In 2019, Anna Kearney represented the country with the song "Banshee", finishing 12th out of 19 entries with 73 points. Despite having initially confirmed their participation in the 2020 contest in Warsaw, Poland in January 2020, TG4 announced in August 2020 that they would not participate in the contest due to the COVID-19 pandemic. In the 2021 contest, Maiú Levi Lawlor represented country in Paris, France with the song "Saor (Disappear)". He ended 18th out of 19 entries with 44 points.

== Before Junior Eurovision ==
=== Junior Eurovision Éire 2022 ===
Irish broadcaster TG4 once again used the national selection format Junior Eurovision Éire to select its representative. The details of the competition were revealed on 22 August 2022, during the TG4 autumn schedule launch. Louise Cantillon returned to host the show for the second year in a row, with Darragh Ó Caoimh serving as a co-host. This was the first edition of Junior Eurovision Éire to have two main presenters. As in previous editions, an in-studio jury decided the results in the four heats and semi-final. As with the past two editions of the contest, the participants in Junior Eurovision Éire performed Irish-language cover versions of famous songs during the competition.

==== Jury members ====
As in previous editions, the results of the four heats and semi-final were decided by an in-studio jury of two permanent members and revolving guest judges. The two permanent judges are:

- Niamh Ní Chróinín – Radio presenter, manager of Irish-language youth radio station Raidió Rí-Rá
- Chris Greene – RTÉ 2fm presenter

Guest judges
Artist	ESC Year(s)	Song(s)	Place (SF)	Points (SF)	Place (Final)	Points (Final)
Linda Martin	1984	"Terminal 3"	No semi-finals		2	137
Linda Martin	1992	"Why Me?"	No semi-finals		1	155
Niamh Kavanagh	1993	"In Your Eyes"	No semi-finals		1	187
Niamh Kavanagh	2010	"It's for You"	9	67	23	25
Paul Harrington	1994	"Rock 'n' Roll Kids" (with Charlie McGettigan)	No semi-finals		1	226
Brian Kennedy	2006	"Every Song Is a Cry for Love"	9	79	10	93
Ryan O'Shaughnessy	2018	"Together"	6	179	16	136
Brooke Scullion	2022	"That's Rich"	15	47	Failed to qualify	

==== Heat 1 ====
The first heat was broadcast on 18 September 2022, with Niamh Kavanagh as the guest judge. Lara Gleeson received the highest number of stars and advanced directly to the semi-final, while Calre Keeley and Ella Kelly advanced to the sing-off stage and performed their covers a second time. After their second performances, the jury members selected Clare as the winner, granting her a spot in the semi-final.

Heat 1 – 18 September 2022
Draw	Artist	Song (Original artists)	Juror 1	Juror 2	Juror 3	Stars	Result
1	Holly Mountstephens	"Nervous" (Gavin James)	6	6	7	20	Eliminated
2	Clare Keeley	"I Will Always Love You" (Whitney Houston)	8	8	7	23	Sing-off
3	Harry Moriarty	"This Is Me" (Keala Settle)	8	7	6	21	Eliminated
4	Lara Gleeson	"When the Party's Over" (Billie Eilish)	8	9	9	26	Semi-final
5	Ella Kelly	"Ghost" (Luane Parle)	7	8	7	22	Sing-off
6	Grace Whelan	"Linger" (The Cranberries)	6	7	8	21	Eliminated

Sing-off – 18 September 2022
Draw	Artist	Song (Original artists)	Votes	Result
1	Clare Keeley	"I Will Always Love You" (Whitney Houston)	2	Semi-final
2	Ella Kelly	"Ghost" (Luan Parle)	1	Eliminated

==== Heat 2 ====
The second heat was broadcast on 25 September 2022, with Ryan O'Shaughnessy as the guest judge. Amber Dawes received the highest number of stars and advanced directly to the semi-final, while Marley-Peig Leonard and Éinín Duggun advanced to the sing-off stage and performed their covers a second time. After their second performances, the jury members selected Marley-Peig as the winner, granting a spot in the semi-final.

Heat 2 – 25 September 2022
Draw	Artist	Song (Original artists)	Juror 1	Juror 2	Juror 3	Stars	Result
1	Marley-Peig Leonard	"Skinny Love" (Bon Iver)	8	9	8	25	Sing-off
2	Callum Scanlan	"The Man Who Can't Be Moved" (The Script)	7	7	8	22	Eliminated
3	Amber Dawes	"Lost Without You" (Freya Ridings)	9	9	9	27	Semi-final
4	Éinín Duggun	"Grace" (Lewis Capaldi)	8	8	7	23	Sing-off
5	Lara Cimic	"Dancing with a Stranger" (Sam Smith and Normani)	6	7	7	20	Eliminated
6	Evan Coogan	"Take My Hand" (Picture This)	6	7	6	19	Eliminated

Sing-off – 25 September 2022
Draw	Artist	Song (Original artists)	Votes	Result
1	Marley-Peig Leonard	"Skinny Love" (Bon Iver)	2	Semi-final
2	Éinín Duggun	"Grace" (Lewis Capaldi)	1	Eliminated

==== Heat 3 ====
The third heat was broadcast on 2 October 2022, with Paul Harrington as the guest judge. Niamh Noade received the highest number of stars and advanced directly to the semi-final, while Caillín Joe McDonald and Teagan Nolan advanced to the sing-off stage and performed their covers a second time. After their second performances, the jury members selected Caillín Joe as the winner, granting a spot in the semi-final.

Heat 3 – 2 October 2022
Draw	Artist	Song (Original artists)	Juror 1	Juror 2	Juror 3	Stars	Result
1	Caillín Joe McDonald	"Shotgun" (George Ezra)	8	8	10	26	Sing-off
2	Teagan Nolan	"Someone You Loved" (Lewis Capaldi)	7	8	9	24	Sing-off
3	Niamh Noade	"Lonely World" (Luane Parle)	9	10	9	28	Semi-final
4	Savannah Phoenix Munroe	"Good as Hell" (Lizzo)	6	7	10	23	Eliminated
5	Eva O'Farrell	"Castles" (Freya Ridings)	8	7	7	22	Eliminated
6	Lucy Heffernan	"Follow Your Fire" (Kodaline)	7	7	8	22	Eliminated

Sing-off – 2 October 2022
Draw	Artist	Song (Original artists)	Votes	Result
1	Caillín Joe McDonald	"Shotgun" (George Ezra)	2	Semi-final
2	Teagan Nolan	"Someone You Loved" (Lewis Capaldi)	1	Eliminated

==== Heat 4 ====
The third heat was broadcast on 9 October 2022, with Linda Martin as the guest judge. Sophie Lennon received the highest number of stars and advanced directly to the semi-final, while Phoebe McIvor and Lauren Wallace advanced to the sing-off stage and performed their covers a second time. After their second performances, the jury members selected Phoebe as the winner, granting a spot in the semi-final.

Heat 4 – 9 October 2022
Draw	Artist	Song (Original artists)	Juror 1	Juror 2	Juror 3	Stars	Result
1	Phoebe McIvor	"Hold Me While You Wait" (Lewis Capaldi)	8	8	10	26	Sing-off
2	Sophie Lennon	"New York" (Paloma Faith)	10	10	10	30	Semi-final
3	Holly-May Vaughan	"Stay with Me" (Sam Smith)	7	7	9	23	Eliminated
4	Lauren Wallace	"Always" (Gavin James)	8	9	8	25	Sing-off
5	Gillian Brennan	"Take Me to Church" (Hozier)	7	9	8	24	Eliminated
6	Gavin Gilligan	"Bruises" (Lewis Capaldi)	7	8	7	22	Eliminated

Sing-off – 9 October 2022
Draw	Artist	Song (Original artists)	Votes	Result
1	Phoebe McIvor	"Hold Me While You Wait" (Lewis Capaldi)	2	Semi-final
2	Lauren Wallace	"Always" (Gavin James)	1	Eliminated

==== Semi-final ====
The third heat was broadcast on 16 October 2022, with Brooke Scullion as the guest judge. Sophie Lennon and Niamh Noade were both chosen by the jury to advance directly to the final. Clare Keeley and Lara Gleeson were both chosen to go through to the sing-off stage and performed their covers a second time. After their second performances, the jury members selected Clare as the winner, granting a spot in the final.

Semi-final – 16 October 2022
Draw	Artist	Song (Original artists)	Result
1	Clare Keeley	"Halo" (Beyoncé)	Sing-off
2	Sophie Lennon	"Symphony" (Clean Bandit and Zara Larsson)	Finalist
3	Marley-Peig Leonard	"A Million Goodbyes" (Lea Heart)	Eliminated
4	Caillín Joe McDonald	"Hold Back the River" (James Bay)	Eliminated
5	Niamh Noade	"Catch and Release" (Matt Simons)	Finalist
6	Lara Gleeson	"Brave" (Ella Henderson)	Sing-off
7	Phoebe McIvor	"Cold Heart (Pnau remix)" (Elton John & Dua Lipa)	Eliminated
8	Amber Dawes	"Falling Slowly" (Glen Handsard & Markéta Irglová)	Eliminated

Sing-off – 16 October 2022
Draw	Artist	Song (Original artists)	Votes	Result
1	Clare Keeley	"Halo" (Beyoncé)	2	Finalist
2	Lara Gleeson	"Brave" (Ella Henderson)	1	Eliminated

==== Final ====
The final took place on 23 October 2022, with Brian Kennedy as the guest judge. The jury of two permanent members and one rotating member was present once again to give feedback to the contestants, but did not have any voting power. For the first time ever, the winner was selected exclusively by public online vote that ran on the TG4 Junior Eurovision website from 17 October until the end of a 15-minute voting period during the broadcast.

Final – 23 October 2022
Artist	Draw	Song (Original artists)	Draw	ESC Winning Song (Original artists)
Clare Keeley	1	"Circle of Life" (Elton John)	4	"Hold Me Now" (Johnny Logan)
Sophie Lennon	2	"Leave a Light On" (Tom Walker)	5	"Why Me?" (Linda Martin)
Niamh Noade	3	"Pompeii" (Bastille)	6	"Rock 'n' Roll Kids" (Paul Harrington & Charlie McGettigan)

== At Junior Eurovision ==
After the opening ceremony, which took place on 5 December 2022, it was announced that Ireland would perform ninth on 11 December 2022, following Georgia and preceding North Macedonia.

In the final, Ireland finished the competition in fourth place with 150 points, including 12 points from both the Maltese and Serbian juries. This marked the best result for Ireland in Junior Eurovision to date.

=== Voting ===
The same voting system that was introduced in the 2017 edition was used, where the results were determined by 50% online voting and 50% jury voting. Every participating broadcaster assembled a national jury that consisted of three music industry professionals and two children aged between 10 and 15 who were citizens of the country they represented. The rankings of those jurors were combined to make an overall top ten.

The online voting consisted of two phases. The first phase of the online voting began on 9 December 2022 when a recap of all the rehearsal performances was shown on the contest's website Junioreurovision.tv before the viewers could vote. After this, voters also had the option to watch longer one-minute clips from each participant's rehearsal. This first round of voting ended on 11 December at 15:59 CET. The second phase of the online voting took place during the live show and began right after the last performance and was open for 15 minutes. International viewers were able to vote for three songs. They were also able to vote for their own country's song. These votes were then turned into points which were determined by the percentage of votes received. For example, if a song received 10% of the votes, it received 10% of the available points.

Points awarded to Ireland
Score	Country
12 points	Malta; Serbia
10 points	France; Poland
8 points	
7 points	Netherlands; North Macedonia; Ukraine
6 points	Italy; United Kingdom
5 points	
4 points	Portugal
3 points	Spain
2 points	Armenia; Georgia
1 point	
Ireland received 62 points from the online vote.

Points awarded by Ireland
Score	Country
12 points	France
10 points	Armenia
8 points	Serbia
7 points	Albania
6 points	Ukraine
5 points	North Macedonia
4 points	Netherlands
3 points	Poland
2 points	Georgia
1 point	Spain

==== Detailed voting results ====
Detailed voting results from Ireland
Draw	Country	Juror A	Juror B	Juror C	Juror D	Juror E	Rank	Points
01	Netherlands	5	11	5	3	6	7	4
02	Poland	14	4	8	4	5	8	3
03	Kazakhstan	11	10	15	15	15	15	
04	Malta	13	12	10	5	12	13	
05	Italy	9	14	9	11	10	14	
06	France	1	3	3	1	14	1	12
07	Albania	10	1	7	8	4	4	7
08	Georgia	12	8	12	10	1	9	2
09	Ireland							
10	North Macedonia	2	15	1	14	7	6	5
11	Spain	6	7	11	13	9	10	1
12	United Kingdom	15	9	6	7	13	11	
13	Portugal	4	13	13	12	11	12	
14	Serbia	3	6	4	9	3	3	8
15	Armenia	8	5	2	6	2	2	10
16	Ukraine	7	2	14	2	8	5	6
