= Serbia in the Junior Eurovision Song Contest 2022 =

- Junior Eurovision Song Contest 2022
- Country: Serbia
- Selection process: Internal selection
- Announcement date: Artist: 10 October 2022; Song: 6 November 2022

Competing entry
- Song: "Svet bez granica"
- Artist: Katarina Savić
- Songwriters: Ivana Dragićević

Placement
- Final result: 13th, 92 points

Participation chronology

Serbia was represented at the Junior Eurovision Song Contest 2022 in Yerevan, Armenia.

== Background ==
Prior to the 2022 contest, Serbia had participated in the Junior Eurovision Song Contest thirteen times since its debut in 2006, and once as Serbia and Montenegro in 2005, prior to the Montenegrin independence referendum in 2006 which culminated into the dissolution of Serbia and Montenegro, As of 2021, Serbia's best results are two third places, achieved in 2007 and 2010. In the 2021 contest, Serbia placed 13th with Jovana and Dunja and the song "Oči deteta (Children's Eyes)".

== Before Junior Eurovision ==
On 10 October 2022, RTS announced that Katarina Savić would represent Serbia in the contest with the song "World Without Borders". The song "Svet bez granica" ("Свет без граница") was later released on 6 November 2022 with the title in Serbian rather than English.

== At Junior Eurovision ==
After the opening ceremony, which took place on 5 December 2022, it was announced that Serbia would perform fourteenth on 11 December 2022, following Portugal and preceding Armenia.

On the day of the final, it was announced that Katarina would not be able to perform live due to medical issues. The footage from her jury show performance, recorded on 10 December, was used instead.

At the end of the contest, Serbia received 92 points, placing 13th out of 16 participating countries.

=== Voting ===
The same voting system that was introduced in the 2017 edition was used, where the results were determined by 50% online voting and 50% jury voting. Every participating broadcaster assembled a national jury that consisted of three music industry professionals and two children aged between 10 and 15 who were citizens of the country they represented. The rankings of those jurors were combined to make an overall top ten.

The online voting consisted of two phases. The first phase of the online voting began on 9 December 2022 when a recap of all the rehearsal performances was shown on the contest's website Junioreurovision.tv before the viewers could vote. After this, voters also had the option to watch longer one-minute clips from each participant's rehearsal. This first round of voting ended on 11 December at 15:59 CET. The second phase of the online voting took place during the live show and began right after the last performance and was open for 15 minutes. International viewers were able to vote for three songs. They were also able to vote for their own country's song. These votes were then turned into points which were determined by the percentage of votes received. For example, if a song received 10% of the votes, it received 10% of the available points.

Points awarded to Serbia
Score	Country
12 points	
10 points	Netherlands
8 points	Ireland; Poland
7 points	
6 points	
5 points	Portugal
4 points	
3 points	Georgia; United Kingdom
2 points	Italy
1 point	North Macedonia; Spain
Serbia received 51 points from the online vote.

Points awarded by Serbia
Score	Country
12 points	Ireland
10 points	France
8 points	Armenia
7 points	Georgia
6 points	Netherlands
5 points	Albania
4 points	North Macedonia
3 points	Italy
2 points	Ukraine
1 point	Spain

==== Detailed voting results ====
Detailed voting results from Serbia
Draw	Country	Juror A	Juror B	Juror C	Juror D	Juror E	Rank	Points
01	Netherlands	6	3	5	4	8	5	6
02	Poland	14	4	7	8	14	11	
03	Kazakhstan	15	13	15	15	2	13	
04	Malta	11	7	9	11	5	12	
05	Italy	2	11	12	14	7	8	3
06	France	3	5	3	3	9	2	10
07	Albania	4	10	4	6	12	6	5
08	Georgia	8	2	6	2	11	4	7
09	Ireland	5	1	1	1	13	1	12
10	North Macedonia	12	8	14	13	1	7	4
11	Spain	13	9	13	9	3	10	1
12	United Kingdom	9	14	8	10	10	15	
13	Portugal	10	15	11	12	4	14	
14	Serbia							
15	Armenia	1	6	2	7	15	3	8
16	Ukraine	7	12	10	5	6	9	2
