= Netherlands in the Junior Eurovision Song Contest 2022 =

2022 Junior Eurovision participation

- Junior Eurovision Song Contest 2022
- Country: Netherlands
- Selection process: Junior Songfestival 2022
- Selection date: 24 September 2022

Competing entry
- Song: "La festa"
- Artist: Luna
- Songwriters: Robert Dorn

Placement
- Final result: 7th, 128 points

Participation chronology

The Netherlands was represented at the Junior Eurovision Song Contest 2022 in Yerevan, Armenia. National broadcaster AVROTROS was responsible for the participation and selected the nation's entrant, Luna with the song "La festa", via national final Junior Songfestival 2022.

== Background ==
The Netherlands is the only country to have participated in every edition of the Junior Eurovision Song Contest since the inaugural 2003 edition. The Netherlands have won the contest on one occasion: in 2009 with the song "Click Clack", performed by Ralf Mackenbach. In the 2021 contest in Paris, France, Ayana represented the Netherlands with the song "Mata Sugu Aō Ne", containing lyrics in Dutch, English and Japanese. She finished in 19th place with 43 points; the first last place result for the Netherlands.

== Before Junior Eurovision ==
=== Junior Songfestival 2022 ===
AVROTROS selected the Dutch representative through the televised national final Junior Songfestival, on 24 September 2022 at the RTM Stage in Rotterdam, a part of the Ahoy venue complex.

==== Competing entries ====
Following the 2021 edition of the competition, the submissions process was opened for singers who want to represent the Netherlands at the 2022 contest. Following a call for participants which closed in February, NPO Zapp revealed the list of singers who made it through to the auditions round in March 2022. The finalists were revealed on 10 and 17 June 2022, during two episodes published on the official Junior Songfestival YouTube channel. Twenty three acts past the audition stage and fourteen of them were selected to be the finalists of Junior Songfestival 2022. The four acts that will compete in the final of Junior Songfestival 2022 were revealed on 24 June 2022. The line-up consists of three groups: a girl group, a boyband, a mixed group and a soloist, being the first line-up in over a decade in which this mix of performers has competed.

Artist	Song	Songwriter(s)	Language(s)
High5	"Because I Know"	Julian Vahle; Maxine van Breukelen	Dutch, English
Infinity	"Never Ever"	Jermain van der Bogt; Willem Laseroms	Dutch, English
Luna	"La festa"	Robert Dorn	Dutch, English (Note: Contains three repeated words in Italian.)
Mixed Up	"It Doesn't Matter"	Jermain van der Bogt; Willem Laseroms	Dutch, English

==== Final ====
The final took place on 24 September 2022, hosted by Matheu Hinzen and Stefania. During the online voting window, the finalists performed a common theme song titled "Living in the Moment". The winner was determined through points given by a kids jury, a professional jury and public voting, each having equal weight. The kids jury consisted of Junior Songfestival 2021 winner Ayana and finalists Shine and Priscilla, and the professional jury consisted of Chantal Janzen, Flemming and Glen Faria. Overall, the show had an average of 187,000 viewers with a share of 5.2%. The average number of viewers increased by 45,000 viewers compared to 2021 and the market share increased by 1.3%.

Junior Songfestival – 24 September 2022
Draw	Artist	Song	Points				Place
Draw	Artist	Song	Kids jury	Prof. jury	Online vote	Total	Place
1	Infinity	"Never Ever"	8	8	8	24	4
2	Mixed Up	"It Doesn't Matter"	10	10	10	30	2
3	High5	"Because I Know"	9	9	9	27	3
4	Luna	"La festa"	12	12	12	36	1

== At Junior Eurovision ==
After the opening ceremony, which took place on 5 December 2022, it was announced that the Netherlands would perform first on 11 December 2022 preceding Poland.

=== Voting ===
The same voting system that was introduced in the 2017 edition was used, where the results were determined by 50% online voting and 50% jury voting. Every participating broadcaster assembled a national jury that consisted of three music industry professionals and two children aged between 10 and 15 who were citizens of the country they represented. The rankings of those jurors were combined to make an overall top ten.

The online voting consisted of two phases. The first phase of the online voting began on 9 December 2022 when a recap of all the rehearsal performances was shown on the contest's website Junioreurovision.tv before the viewers could vote. After this, voters also had the option to watch longer one-minute clips from each participant's rehearsal. This first round of voting ended on 11 December at 15:59 CET. The second phase of the online voting took place during the live show and began right after the last performance and was open for 15 minutes. International viewers were able to vote for three songs. They were also able to vote for their own country's song. These votes were then turned into points which were determined by the percentage of votes received. For example, if a song received 10% of the votes, it received 10% of the available points.

Points awarded to the Netherlands
Score	Country
12 points	
10 points	
8 points	Malta; Spain
7 points	Albania; United Kingdom
6 points	Armenia; Serbia
5 points	
4 points	Ireland
3 points	France; Kazakhstan; North Macedonia; Ukraine
2 points	
1 point	
The Netherlands received 70 points from the online vote.

Points awarded by the Netherlands
Score	Country
12 points	France
10 points	Serbia
8 points	Georgia
7 points	Ireland
6 points	United Kingdom
5 points	Armenia
4 points	Portugal
3 points	Spain
2 points	Poland
1 point	North Macedonia

==== Detailed voting results ====
Detailed voting results from the Netherlands
Draw	Country	Juror A	Juror B	Juror C	Juror D	Juror E	Rank	Points
01	Netherlands							
02	Poland	11	5	8	11	5	9	2
03	Kazakhstan	15	10	14	15	15	14	
04	Malta	14	14	15	13	14	15	
05	Italy	12	9	13	5	12	11	
06	France	5	2	5	2	1	1	12
07	Albania	10	7	10	14	10	12	
08	Georgia	2	4	2	7	6	3	8
09	Ireland	4	8	1	9	8	4	7
10	North Macedonia	3	6	12	10	13	10	1
11	Spain	13	15	6	3	3	8	3
12	United Kingdom	7	13	4	1	7	5	6
13	Portugal	9	3	7	4	9	7	4
14	Serbia	1	1	11	8	2	2	10
15	Armenia	6	12	3	6	4	6	5
16	Ukraine	8	11	9	12	11	13	
