= Poland in the Junior Eurovision Song Contest 2022 =

- Junior Eurovision Song Contest 2022
- Country: Poland
- Selection process: Szansa na sukces. Eurowizja Junior 2022
- Selection date: Heats; 4 September 2022; 11 September 2022; 18 September 2022; Final; 25 September 2022

Competing entry
- Song: "To the Moon"
- Artist: Laura
- Songwriters: Monika "Mimi" Wydrzyńska; Jakub Sebastian Krupski

Placement
- Final result: 10th, 95 points

Participation chronology

Poland was represented at the Junior Eurovision Song Contest 2022, which was held on 11 December 2022 in Yerevan, Armenia. Polish broadcaster Telewizja Polska (TVP) is responsible for the country's participation in the contest, and chose the Polish artist and song through the national selection Szansa na Sukces.

== Background ==
Prior to the 2021 contest, Poland had participated in the contest seven times: In 2003 and 2004, Poland finished in last place, and they decided not to participate from 2005 to 2015. The country returned in 2016. Olivia Wieczorek was selected to represent the nation that year with the song "Nie zapomnij". Olivia finished in 11th place out of 17 entries with 60 points. In 2017, Alicja Rega was selected to represent Poland with the song "Mój dom". She finished 8th out of 16 entries with 138 points. In both 2018 and 2019, Poland won the Junior Eurovision Song Contest with Roksana Węgiel and Viki Gabor respectively, becoming the first country to win the contest two years in a row. In 2021, Sara James competed for Poland with the song "Somebody" which ended up in 2nd place out of 19 entries with 218 points, being 6 points short of winning the competition.

== Before Junior Eurovision ==
=== Szansa na sukces ===
Polish broadcaster TVP once again selected the Polish representative through a special edition of the television programme Szansa na sukces (transl. A Chance of Success) under the name Szansa na sukces. Eurowizja Junior 2022. The same procedure was also used for the Junior Eurovision Song Contest from 2019 to 2021, and in 2020 for the Eurovision Song Contest. All shows were hosted by Aleksander Sikora, who also hosted the Junior Eurovision Song Contest 2019, and broadcast on TVP2. Szansa na sukces once again consisted of four shows: three Heats broadcast on 4 September, 11 September and 18 September, and a final on 25 September. Seven singers, as determined after the auditions held 14 and 15 May in Warsaw, performed songs that were drawn randomly in each Heat, with one (traditionally, another finalist might be picked as a wildcard with the Golden Ticket) qualifying for the final as determined by a jury of artists.

==== Shows ====
===== Heat 1 =====
The first Heat was broadcast on 4 September 2022. The topic of the episode was "international hits". A honourable mention and the winner were determined by a jury panel consisting of: Cleo (singer, Polish representative in the Eurovision Song Contest 2014), Sara James (singer, runner-up in the Junior Eurovision Song Contest 2021) and Marek Sierocki (Polish commentator of the Junior Eurovision Song Contest). For the first time in the history of the show, the ability to pick a Golden Ticket finalist was used to select Laura Bączkiewicz as the second finalist of the episode.

Key: Jury finalist Wildcard finalist Honourable mention

Heat 1 – 4 September 2022
| Draw | Artist | Song | Result |
|---|---|---|---|
| 1 | Laura Bączkiewicz | "Run" | Advanced |
| 2 | Zofia Tofiluk | "Hold My Hand" | Eliminated |
| 3 | Natalia Smaś | "Easy On Me" | Advanced |
| 4 | Helena Włodarczyk | "Diamonds" | Eliminated |
| 5 | Iga Kaczyńska | "Dynamite" | Eliminated |
| 6 | Anastazja Broniszewska | "Wonder" | Eliminated |
| 7 | Elena Popowicz | "Rain On Me" | Eliminated |

===== Heat 2 =====
The second Heat was broadcast on 11 September 2022. The topic of the episode was "the Polish Junior Eurovision". Two honourable mentions and the winner were determined by a jury panel consisting of: Lanberry (singer-songwriter, composer of the Polish songs in the Junior Eurovision Song Contest 2018 and 2019), Viki Gabor (winner of the Junior Eurovision Song Contest 2019) and Marek Sierocki (Polish commentator of the Junior Eurovision Song Contest).

Key: Jury finalist Wildcard finalist Honourable mention

Heat 2 – 11 September 2022
| Draw | Artist | Song | Result |
|---|---|---|---|
| 1 | Kornelia Sadowska | "Superhero" | Eliminated |
| 2 | Amelia Borkowska | "I'll Be Standing" | Eliminated |
| 3 | Zosia Szuca | "Somebody" | Eliminated |
| 4 | Aleksander Maląg | "Mój dom" | Advanced |
| 5 | Julia Kostyła | "Anyone I Want to Be" | Eliminated |
| 6 | Lena Wójcicka | "Share the Joy" | Eliminated |
| 7 | Victoria Konys | "#MoveTheWorld" | Eliminated |

===== Heat 3 =====
The third Heat was broadcast on 18 September 2022. The topic of the episode was "the huge hits of the Eurovision Song Contest". The winner was determined by a jury panel consisting of: Ala Tracz (Polish representative in the Junior Eurovision Song Contest 2020), Michał Wiśniewski (Polish representative in the Eurovision Song Contest 2003 and 2006, as part of Ich Troje), Ida Nowakowska (co-host of the Junior Eurovision Song Contest 2019 and 2020) and Marek Sierocki (Polish commentator of the Junior Eurovision Song Contest).

Key: Jury finalist Wildcard finalist Honourable mention

Heat 3 – 18 September 2022
| Draw | Artist | Song | Result |
|---|---|---|---|
| 1 | Kinga Kipigroch | "Euphoria" | Eliminated |
| 2 | Julia Kowalska | "Arcade" | Eliminated |
| 3 | Ida Wargskog | "If I Were Sorry" | Advanced |
| 4 | Beniamin Nowacki | "Fairytale" | Eliminated |
| 5 | Aleksander Szwarnowiecki | "Waterloo" | Eliminated |
| 6 | Antonina Kraszewska | "Save Your Kisses for Me" | Eliminated |
| 7 | Alicja Smyk | "Light Me Up" | Eliminated |

===== Final =====
The final took place on 25 September 2022. In the first round, all contestants performed songs from the Heat they took part in. Two artists qualified to the second round based on a 50/50 combination of votes from a jury and public vote. In the second round, the artists performed original songs and the winner was selected by a jury consisting of three members: Konrad Smuga (director of Polish performances at Junior Eurovision), Grzegorz Urban (music director of Szansa na Sukces), and Anna Cyzowska-Andura (director of the TVP Entertainment Agency). (Note: Officially, the winner was determined by a 50/50 combination of jury and public votes cast through SMS – each awarding sets of 8 and 10 points – with the former taking precedence in the event of a tie. However, this effectively made it impossible for the public vote to affect the result. Both parties eventually awarded their 10 points to Laura Bączkiewicz.) Another panel consisting of Rafał Brzozowski (co-host of the Junior Eurovision Song Contest 2020, Polish representative in the Eurovision Song Contest 2021), Viki Gabor (winner of the Junior Eurovision Song Contest 2019) and Marek Sierocki (Polish commentator of the Junior Eurovision Song Contest) provided feedback in regards to the songs during the show, but had no voting power. In addition to the performances of the competing entries, Viki Gabor performed her new single "Barbie" as the interval act.

First Round – 25 September 2022
| Draw | Artist | Song | Result |
|---|---|---|---|
| 1 | Natalia Smaś | "Rain On Me" | Eliminated |
| 2 | Ida Wargskog | "Arcade" | Eliminated |
| 3 | Aleksander Maląg | "Somebody" | Advanced |
| 4 | Laura Bączkiewicz | "Hold My Hand" | Advanced |

Second Round – 25 September 2022
| Draw | Artist | Song | Songwriter(s) |
|---|---|---|---|
| 1 | Laura Bączkiewicz | "To the Moon" | Monika "Mimi" Wydrzyńska, Jakub Sebastian Krupski |
| 2 | Aleksander Maląg | "On My Way" | Gromee, Sara Chmiel-Gromala, Marta Gałuszewska |

==== Ratings ====
Viewing figures
| Show | Date | Viewing figures | | Ref. |
| Show | Date | Nominal | Share | Ref. |
|---|---|---|---|---|
| Heat 1 | 4 September 2022 | 1,702,554 | 11,23% | |
| Heat 2 | 11 September 2022 | 1,830,927 | 10,36% | |
| Heat 3 | 18 September 2022 | 2,374,570 | 12,22% | |
| Final | 25 September 2022 | 2,043,538 | 13,39% | |

== At Junior Eurovision ==
After the opening ceremony, which took place on 5 December 2022, it was announced that Poland would perform second on 11 December 2022, following the Netherlands and preceding Kazakhstan.

=== Voting ===
The same voting system that was introduced in the 2017 edition was used, where the results were determined by 50% online voting and 50% jury voting. Every participating broadcaster assembled a national jury that consisted of three music industry professionals and two children aged between 10 and 15 who were citizens of the country they represented. The rankings of those jurors were combined to make an overall top ten.

The online voting consisted of two phases. The first phase of the online voting began on 9 December 2022 when a recap of all the rehearsal performances was shown on the contest's website Junioreurovision.tv before the viewers could vote. After this, voters also had the option to watch longer one-minute clips from each participant's rehearsal. This first round of voting ended on 11 December at 15:59 CET. The second phase of the online voting took place during the live show and began right after the last performance and was open for 15 minutes. International viewers were able to vote for three songs. They were also able to vote for their own country's song. These votes were then turned into points which were determined by the percentage of votes received. For example, if a song received 10% of the votes, it received 10% of the available points.

Points awarded to Poland
| Score | Country |
|---|---|
| 12 points | |
| 10 points | |
| 8 points | Albania |
| 7 points | Armenia |
| 6 points | Ukraine |
| 5 points | Italy; Malta |
| 4 points | North Macedonia |
| 3 points | Ireland |
| 2 points | Netherlands; Spain |
| 1 point | |
Poland received 53 points from the online vote.

Points awarded by Poland
| Score | Country |
|---|---|
| 12 points | Georgia |
| 10 points | Ireland |
| 8 points | Serbia |
| 7 points | Ukraine |
| 6 points | Albania |
| 5 points | France |
| 4 points | Portugal |
| 3 points | United Kingdom |
| 2 points | Armenia |
| 1 point | Spain |

==== Detailed voting results ====
Detailed voting results from Poland
| Draw | Country | Juror A | Juror B | Juror C | Juror D | Juror E | Rank | Points |
|---|---|---|---|---|---|---|---|---|
| 01 | Netherlands | 7 | 15 | 7 | 6 | 13 | 11 | |
| 02 | Poland | | | | | | | |
| 03 | Kazakhstan | 15 | 14 | 15 | 14 | 11 | 15 | |
| 04 | Malta | 8 | 11 | 12 | 12 | 15 | 13 | |
| 05 | Italy | 13 | 12 | 10 | 15 | 7 | 12 | |
| 06 | France | 3 | 9 | 5 | 13 | 2 | 6 | 5 |
| 07 | Albania | 4 | 10 | 2 | 8 | 5 | 5 | 6 |
| 08 | Georgia | 1 | 1 | 1 | 1 | 1 | 1 | 12 |
| 09 | Ireland | 5 | 6 | 3 | 4 | 4 | 2 | 10 |
| 10 | North Macedonia | 11 | 13 | 14 | 10 | 14 | 14 | |
| 11 | Spain | 12 | 5 | 4 | 9 | 10 | 10 | 1 |
| 12 | United Kingdom | 14 | 7 | 8 | 3 | 8 | 8 | 3 |
| 13 | Portugal | 6 | 2 | 13 | 11 | 9 | 7 | 4 |
| 14 | Serbia | 2 | 3 | 11 | 7 | 6 | 3 | 8 |
| 15 | Armenia | 9 | 4 | 9 | 5 | 12 | 9 | 2 |
| 16 | Ukraine | 10 | 8 | 6 | 2 | 3 | 4 | 7 |
