= North Macedonia in the Junior Eurovision Song Contest 2022 =

- Junior Eurovision Song Contest 2022
- Country: North Macedonia
- Selection process: Internal selection
- Announcement date: 2 November 2022

Competing entry
- Song: "Životot e pred mene"
- Artist: Lara feat. Jovan and Irina
- Songwriters: Lara Trpčeska; Simon Trpčeski; Jovan Trpčeski; Darko Dimitrov

Placement
- Final result: 14th, 54 points

Participation chronology

North Macedonia was represented at the Junior Eurovision Song Contest 2022 in Armenia, which was held on 11 December 2022 in Yerevan. Macedonian broadcaster Macedonian Radio Television (MRT) is responsible for the country's participation in the contest, and selected Lara, Jovan and Irina as the Macedonian entrants.

== Background ==
Prior to the 2022 contest, North Macedonia had participated in the Junior Eurovision Song Contest fifteen times, under the provisional reference of "Former Yugoslav Republic of Macedonia", since its debut at the inaugural contest in 2003. North Macedonia were absent twice from the Junior Eurovision Song Contest in 2012 and 2014. They have never won the contest, with their best results being at the 2007 and 2008, represented by the duo Rosica Kulakova and Dimitar Stojmenovski, and Bobi Andonov respectively, achieving fifth place. North Macedonia continued to participate in the contest, but the country withdrew in 2020 due to the COVID-19 pandemic. In the 2021 contest, Dajte Muzika represented the country with the song "Green Forces" and placed 9th with a total of 114 points, being the country's first second Top 10 placement in a row since 2008.

== Before Junior Eurovision ==
An audition round was held on 23 June 2022 at the MRT Studios in Skopje. The selection criteria were vocal, artistic and scenic quality. On 29 June 2022, it was revealed that Lara Trpčeska and Irina Dazidovska had been selected as Macedonian entrants by the committee. Although originally not part of the act, Jovan Jakimovski was later added after Lara and Irina were selected, and on 2 November it was revealed Lara feat. Jovan and Irina will represent the country with the song "Životot e pred mene", written by Lara Trpčeska, Lara's wealthy and successful musician father Simon Trpčeski, Jovan Jakimovski and Darko Dimitrov. The song premiered on 3 November 2022 during the MRT programme Dnevnik 2.

== At Junior Eurovision ==
After the opening ceremony, which took place on 5 December 2022, it was announced that North Macedonia would perform tenth on 11 December 2022, following Ireland and preceding Spain.

=== Voting ===
The same voting system that was introduced in the 2017 edition was used, where the results were determined by 50% online voting and 50% jury voting. Every participating broadcaster assembled a national jury that consisted of three music industry professionals and two children aged between 10 and 15 who were citizens of the country they represented. The rankings of those jurors were combined to make an overall top ten.

The online voting consisted of two phases. The first phase of the online voting began on 9 December 2022 when a recap of all the rehearsal performances was shown on the contest's website Junioreurovision.tv before the viewers could vote. After this, voters also had the option to watch longer one-minute clips from each participant's rehearsal. This first round of voting ended on 11 December at 15:59 CET. The second phase of the online voting took place during the live show and began right after the last performance and was open for 15 minutes. International viewers were able to vote for three songs. They were also able to vote for their own country's song. These votes were then turned into points which were determined by the percentage of votes received. For example, if a song received 10% of the votes, it received 10% of the available points.

Points awarded to North Macedonia
Score	Country
12 points	
10 points	
8 points	
7 points	
6 points	
5 points	Ireland
4 points	Serbia
3 points	
2 points	Ukraine
1 point	Netherlands
North Macedonia received 42 points from the online vote.

Points awarded by North Macedonia
Score	Country
12 points	Armenia
10 points	France
8 points	Georgia
7 points	Ireland
6 points	Portugal
5 points	Spain
4 points	Poland
3 points	Netherlands
2 points	United Kingdom
1 point	Serbia

==== Detailed voting results ====
Detailed voting results from North Macedonia
Draw	Country	Juror A	Juror B	Juror C	Juror D	Juror E	Rank	Points
01	Netherlands	10	5	15	4	7	8	3
02	Poland	14	13	8	3	3	7	4
03	Kazakhstan	15	9	11	12	11	14	
04	Malta	13	15	14	11	10	15	
05	Italy	3	11	13	14	14	12	
06	France	4	8	2	2	2	2	10
07	Albania	5	14	10	9	9	11	
08	Georgia	7	1	1	8	8	3	8
09	Ireland	11	6	5	5	4	4	7
10	North Macedonia							
11	Spain	9	4	9	6	5	6	5
12	United Kingdom	12	7	7	7	6	9	2
13	Portugal	2	3	12	10	15	5	6
14	Serbia	6	12	3	15	12	10	1
15	Armenia	1	2	4	1	1	1	12
16	Ukraine	8	10	6	13	13	13	
