= December 10 (group) =

English–Irish boy band

- Origin: London, England
- Genres: Pop; pop rock
- Years active: 2025–present
- Labels: Syco; EMI; Republic
- Members: Cruz Lee-Ojo; Hendrik Christoffersen; John Fadare; Josh Olliver; Nicolas Alves; Sean Hayden; Danny Bretherton
- Website: december10.com

December 10 is a English–Irish boy band formed in 2025. Formed on the Netflix series Simon Cowell: The Next Act, the group consists of Cruz Lee-Ojo, Hendrik Christoffersen, John Fadare, Josh Olliver, Nicolas Alves, Sean Hayden, and Danny Bretherton. Their debut EP, On Your Side, charted at the UK Albums Chart at number 5.

== History ==
In June 2024, record executive Simon Cowell announced he would be searching for a new boyband to emulate the success of his previous boyband, One Direction. He said that the process would be filmed for a potential future documentary series. He later signed a deal with Netflix for a series aimed to discover the boyband.

On 10 December 2025, Netflix released the program, titled Simon Cowell: The Next Act, as a six-episode documentary series following the audition process and the formation of the then-unnamed band. Cowell had initially planned to select only five of the contestants for the band, but ended up keeping all seven finalists, saying "seven people just popped". Five days later, the group released their first song on YouTube, a cover of NSYNC's "Bye Bye Bye".

On 30 January 2026, the band released their first single, "Run My Way", which charted at No. 68 on the UK singles chart. On 6 March, they released their second single, "Angel". The group released their third single, "Infinity (123)", on 16 May 2026.

The group performed at the Capital Summertime Ball 2026 in London on 6 June 2026, singing their singles "Run My Way" and "Infinity (123)" as well as a cover of "End of Beginning" by Djo. Their debut EP, On Your Side, was released on 10 July 2026 and reached No. 5 on the UK Albums Chart.

== Members ==
Adapted from a profile by Tudum/Netflix:

- Cruz Lee-Ojo
- Danny Bretherton
- Hendrik Christoffersen
- John Fadare
- Josh Olliver
- Nicolas Alves
- Seán Hayden

== Discography ==
=== Extended plays ===
Title	Details	Peak chart positions	
Title	Details	UK	IRE
On Your Side	Released: 10 July 2026; Label: Syco, EMI, Republic; Format: CD, LP, digital download, cassette, streaming	5	3

=== Singles ===
Title	Year	Peak chart positions				Album
Title	Year	UK	IRE	LTU Air.	NZ Hot	Album
"Run My Way"	2026	68	97	—	25	On Your Side
"Angel"	2026	—	—	—	—	On Your Side
"Infinity (123)"	2026	—	—	77	—	On Your Side
"Everybody's Leaving"	2026	—	—	—	—	TBA
"—" denotes items which were not released in that country or failed to chart.

=== Other charted songs ===
Title	Year	Peak chart positions									Album
Title	Year	BLR Air.	CIS Air.	EST Air.	JPN Over.	KAZ Air.	LTU Air.	MDA Air.	RUS Air.	SWE Air.	Album
"Us Against the World"	2026	11	21	36	10	6	33	37	20	8	On Your Side

=== Music videos ===
Title	Year	Director(s)	Ref.
"Bye Bye Bye"	2025	Warren Smith	
"Run My Way"	2026	KC Locke	
"Angel"	2026	Laurence Warder	
"Infinity (123)"	2026	Saorla Houston	

== Tours ==
Headlining

- The Introduction Tour (2026)
- The Next Step Tour (2026)
