= Agir (singer) =

Portuguese singer and composer

- Born: 18 March 1988 (age 38); Lisbon, Portugal
- Genres: Dancehall; Pop; Hip hop; Soul; R&B; Adult contemporary
- Occupations: Singer; composer
- Instruments: Vocals; piano
- Years active: 2000s–present
- Label: Vidisco
- Website: agirofficial.pt

Bernardo Correia Ribeiro de Carvalho Costa (born 18 March 1988), popularly known as Agir, is a Portuguese singer, composer and producer. He was born in Lisbon.

== Nominations and awards ==
Year	Award	Category	Work	Result
2015	MTV Europe Music Award	Best Portuguese Act		Won
2016	José da Ponte Award	—		Won
2016	Golden Globes (Portugal)	Best Individual Musical Performer		Won
2016	Golden Globes (Portugal)	Best Song	"Tempo É Dinheiro"	Nominated
2018	Golden Globes (Portugal)	Best Song		
2018	Golden Globes (Portugal)	Best Song	"Manto de Água" (feat. Ana Moura)	Nominated

== Discography ==
=== Studio albums ===
Title	Details	Peak chart positions
Title	Details	POR
Agir	Released: 29 July 2010 (POR)	—
Leva-me a Sério	Released: 4 May 2015 (POR); Labels: Valentim de Carvalho	1
No Fame	Released: 4 May 2018 (POR); Labels: We Are Music, Universal Music	3

=== Singles ===
List of singles, with selected details and chart positions
Title	Year	Peak chart positions	Album
Title	Year	POR	Album
"Tempo é Dinheiro"	2016	86	Leva-me a Sério
"Parte-Me O Pescoço"	2016	38	Leva-me a Sério
"Como Ela é Bela"	2016	13	Leva-me a Sério
"Makeup"	2017	20	Non-album single(s)
"Manto de Água (ft. Ana Moura)"	2017	88	Non-album single(s)
"Queres ou Não Queres"	2017	—	Non-album single(s)
"Pensa em Nós"	2017	—	Non-album single(s)
"—" denotes a recording that did not chart or was not released in that territory.

== Family ==
Agir is the son of singer Paulo de Carvalho and actress Helena Isabel. Both of them are famous in Portugal. Agir married Catarina Gama in 2017.
