= Junior Eurovision Song Contest =

Annual international children's song competition

- Logo since 2025
- Genre: Music competition
- Created by: Bjørn Erichsen
- Based on: MGP Nordic by DR
- Presented by: Various presenters
- Countries of origin: Various participating countries
- Original languages: English and French
- No. of episodes: 24 contests

Production
- Production locations: Various host cities
- Running time: 105–160 minutes
- Production companies: European Broadcasting Union; Various national broadcasters

Original release
- Release: 15 November 2003 – present

Related
- Eurovision Song Contest

The Junior Eurovision Song Contest, often known simply as Junior Eurovision, is an international children's song competition organised annually by the European Broadcasting Union (EBU) among its members since 2003. Each participating broadcaster submits an original song representing its country, to be performed by children of its choice aged 9 to 14, lasting three minutes at most, and broadcast live to all of them via the Eurovision and Euroradio networks, and then casts votes for the participating countries' songs to determine a winner. It is a spin-off of the Eurovision Song Contest with which it has many similarities.

Since 2017, viewers worldwide can vote for their favourite entries through online voting, and a national jury assembled by each participating broadcaster also vote for their favourites. The overall winner of the contest is the entry that receives the most points after the scores from every country have been collected and totalled. The main differences with the Eurovision Song Contest are that in the junior version, the song must be predominantly in the language of the country it represents, and viewers can vote for their own country. The most recent winning song is "Boo!" performed by Naré representing Armenia, who won the 2026 contest in Ta’Qali, Malta.

In addition to the participating countries, the contest has also been broadcast in Finland in 2003 and Bosnia and Herzegovina in 2004 and from 2006 to 2011, Andorra in 2006, Iceland in 2021 and Luxembourg in 2024, although these countries have not yet taken part in the contest. Since 2006, the contest has been streamed live on the Internet through the official website of the contest. Australia was invited to participate in the 2015 contest, while Kazakhstan was invited in the 2018 contest, making it the only major Eurovision event to feature multiple EBU associate member broadcasters.

== Origins and history ==
The origins of the contest date back to 2000 when Danmarks Radio (DR) held a song contest for Danish children that year and the following year. The idea was extended to a Scandinavian song festival in 2002, MGP Nordic, with Denmark, Norway, and Sweden as participants. In 2001 and 2002, Polish broadcaster Telewizja Polska (TVP) hosted two pilot editions of an international song contest for children in Konin with the name Eurokonkurs (English: Eurocontest) in 2001 and Światowy Konkurs Piosenki (English: World Song Contest) in 2002 but the whole project was called Eurokonkurs. TVP went on to hold further editions in Konin between 2003 and 2006, some time of which after Poland's initial withdrawal from Junior Eurovision Song Contest. In 2006, Eurokonkurs returned as Światowe Talenty (English: World Talents) and was hosted by Dominika Rydz and Weronika Bochat, who represented Poland in 2004 as part of girl group KWADro.

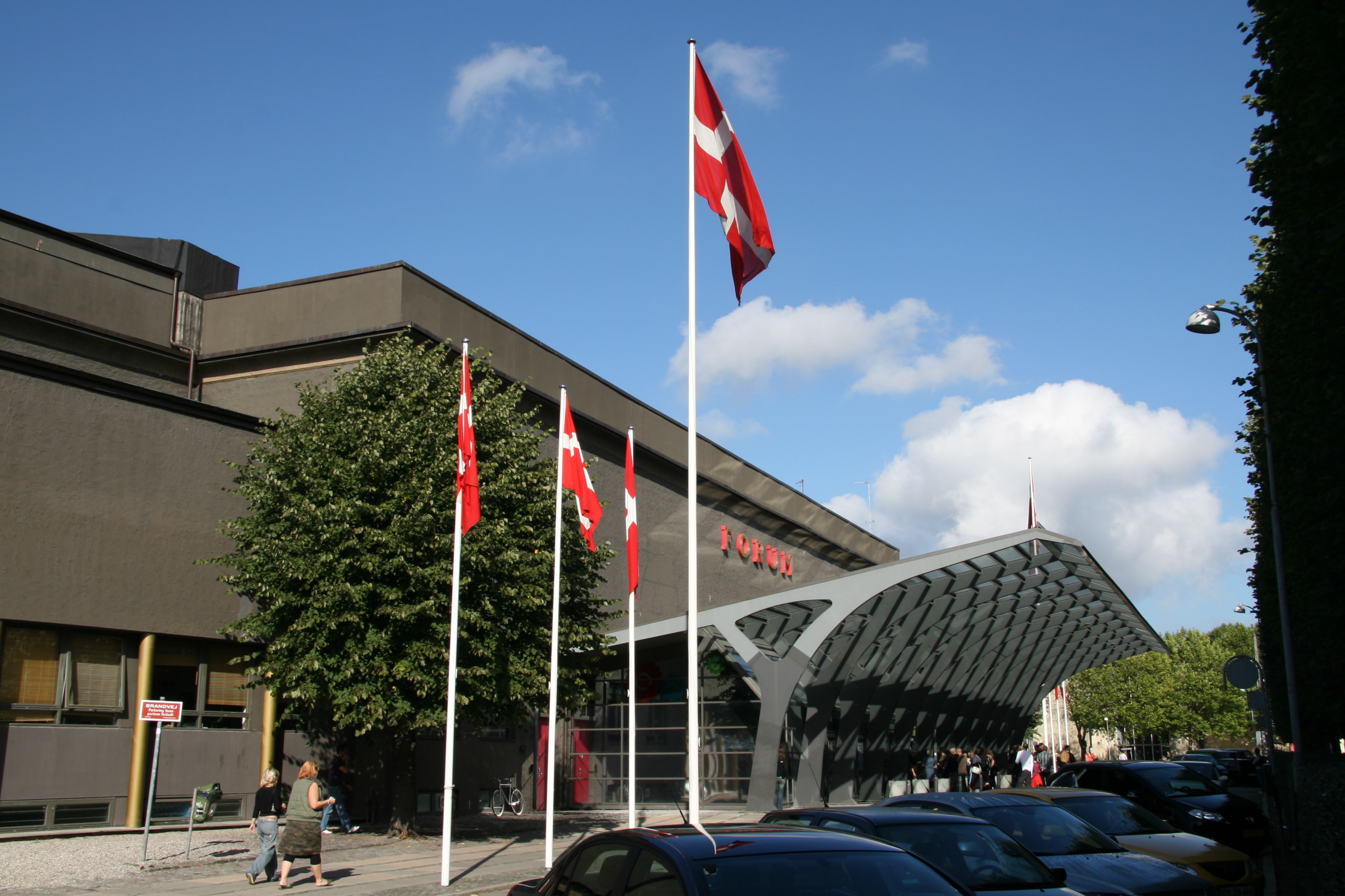
Forum in Copenhagen, Denmark hosted the inaugural edition of the contest in 2003.

In November 2002, the European Broadcasting Union (EBU) picked up the idea for a song contest featuring children and opened the competition to all member broadcasters making it a pan-European event. The working title of the programme was "Eurovision Song Contest for Children", branded with the name of the EBU's long-running and already popular song competition, the Eurovision Song Contest. DR was asked to host the first edition after its experience with MGP Nordic.

After a successful first contest in Copenhagen, the second faced several location problems. The event originally should have been organised by British broadcaster ITV in Manchester. ITV then announced that due to financial and scheduling reasons, it would not host the event. It is also thought that another factor to their decision was the previous year's audience ratings for ITV which were below the expected amount. The EBU approached Croatian broadcaster Hrvatska radiotelevizija (HRT), who had won the previous contest, to stage the event in Zagreb, though it later emerged that HRT had 'forgotten' to book the venue in which the contest would have taken place. It was at this point, with five months remaining until the event would be held, that Norwegian broadcaster Norsk rikskringkasting (NRK) stepped in to host the contest in Lillehammer.

Broadcasters have had to bid for the rights to host the contest since 2004 to avoid such problems from happening again. The broadcasters from Belgium were therefore the first to successfully bid for the rights to host the contest in 2005.

All contests have been broadcast in 16:9 widescreen and in high definition. All have also had a CD produced with the songs from the show. Between 2003 and 2006, DVDs of the contest were also produced though this ended due to lack of interest.

As of 2008, the winner of the contest is decided by 50% televote and 50% national jury vote. The winners of all previous contests had been decided exclusively by televoting. Between 2003 and 2005 viewers had around 10 minutes to vote after all the songs had been performed. Between 2006 and 2010 the televoting lines were open throughout the programme. Since 2011 viewers vote after all the songs had been performed. Profits made from the televoting during the 2007 and 2008 contests were donated to UNICEF.

Prior to 2007, a participating broadcaster's failure in not broadcasting the contest live would incur a fine. Now broadcasters are no longer required to broadcast the contest live, but may transmit it with some delay at a time that is more appropriate for children's television broadcast.

The 2007 contest was the subject of the 2008 documentary Sounds Like Teen Spirit: A Popumentary. The film followed several contestants as they made their way through the national finals and onto the show itself. It was shown at the Toronto International Film Festival 2008 and was premiered in Ghent, Belgium and also in Limassol, Cyprus, where the 2008 contest was held.

== Format ==
The format of the contest has remained relatively unchanged over the course of its history in that the format consists of successive live musical performances by the artists entered by the participating broadcasters. The EBU claims that the aim of the programme is "to promote young talent in the field of popular music, by encouraging competition among the [...] performers".

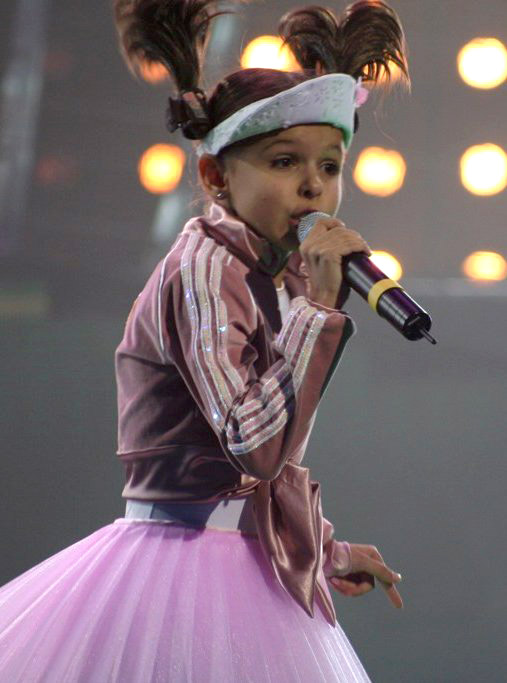
Ksenia Sitnik claimed Belarus' first win in 2005 with "My vmeste". Her country's next victory was two years later with Alexey Zhigalkovich

The programme is usually on a Saturday night in November or December and lasts approximately two hours and fifteen minutes. Between 2016 and 2023, the contest was screened on Sunday afternoon instead.

Traditionally the contest will consist of an opening ceremony in which the performers are welcomed to the event, the performances of the entries, a recap of the songs to help televoting viewers decide which entries to vote for, an interval act usually performed after the televoting has closed, the results of the televoting or back-up jury voting which is then followed by the declaration of the winning song and its reprise. At various points throughout the show, networks may opt out for a few minutes to screen a commercial break.

Since 2008 the winning entry of each contest has been decided by a mixture of televoting and national juries, each counting for fifty per cent of the points awarded by each country. The winners of all previous contests had been decided exclusively by televoting. The ten entries that have received the most votes in each country are awarded points ranging from one to eight, then ten and twelve. These points are then announced live during the programme by a spokesperson appointed by the corresponding participating broadcaster (who, like the performers, is aged between ten and fifteen). Once all participating countries have announced their results, the song that has received the most points is declared the winner of that year's contest.

Until 2013 the winners receive a trophy and a certificate. Between 2013 and 2016 contest the winner, runner-up and third place all won trophies and certificates.

Originally, unlike its adult version, the winning broadcaster did not receive the rights to host the next contest. From 2014 until 2017, the winning broadcaster had first refusal on hosting the following contest. Italy's Radiotelevisione italiana (RAI) used this clause in 2015 to decline hosting the contest that year after its victory in 2014. On 15 October 2017, the EBU announced a return to the original system in 2018, claiming that it would help provide broadcasters with a greater amount of time to prepare, ensuring the continuation of the contest into the future. However, from 2019, all contests have been hosted by the previous year's winning broadcaster, with the exception of the 2024 contest being hosted by the runner-up of the 2023 contest, Spain's Radiotelevisión Española (RTVE), after the 2023 winner, France's France Télévisions, declined to host again after hosting in 2021 and 2023.

The contest usually features two presenters, one man and one woman, who regularly appear on stage and with the contestants in the green room. The presenters are also responsible for repeating the results immediately after the spokesperson of each participating broadcaster to confirm which country the points are being given to. Between 2003 and 2012, the spokespersons gave out the points in the same format as the adult contest, in front of a backdrop of a major city of that country in the broadcaster's television studio. From 2013 to 2023, the spokespersons gave the points from their country on the arena stage, as opposed to the adult contest where spokespersons are broadcast live from their respective country (with the exception of 2020, due to travel restrictions related to the COVID-19 pandemic). From 2024 onwards, the previous format made a return where the spokespersons give out the points in front of a backdrop.

Despite the Junior Eurovision Song Contest being modelled on the format of the Eurovision Song Contest, there are many distinctive differences that are unique to the children's contest. From 2005 to 2015 every contestant was automatically awarded 12 points to prevent the contestants scoring zero points, although ending with 12 points total was in essence the same as receiving zero, however, no entry has ever received nul points in total scoring.

== Entry restrictions ==
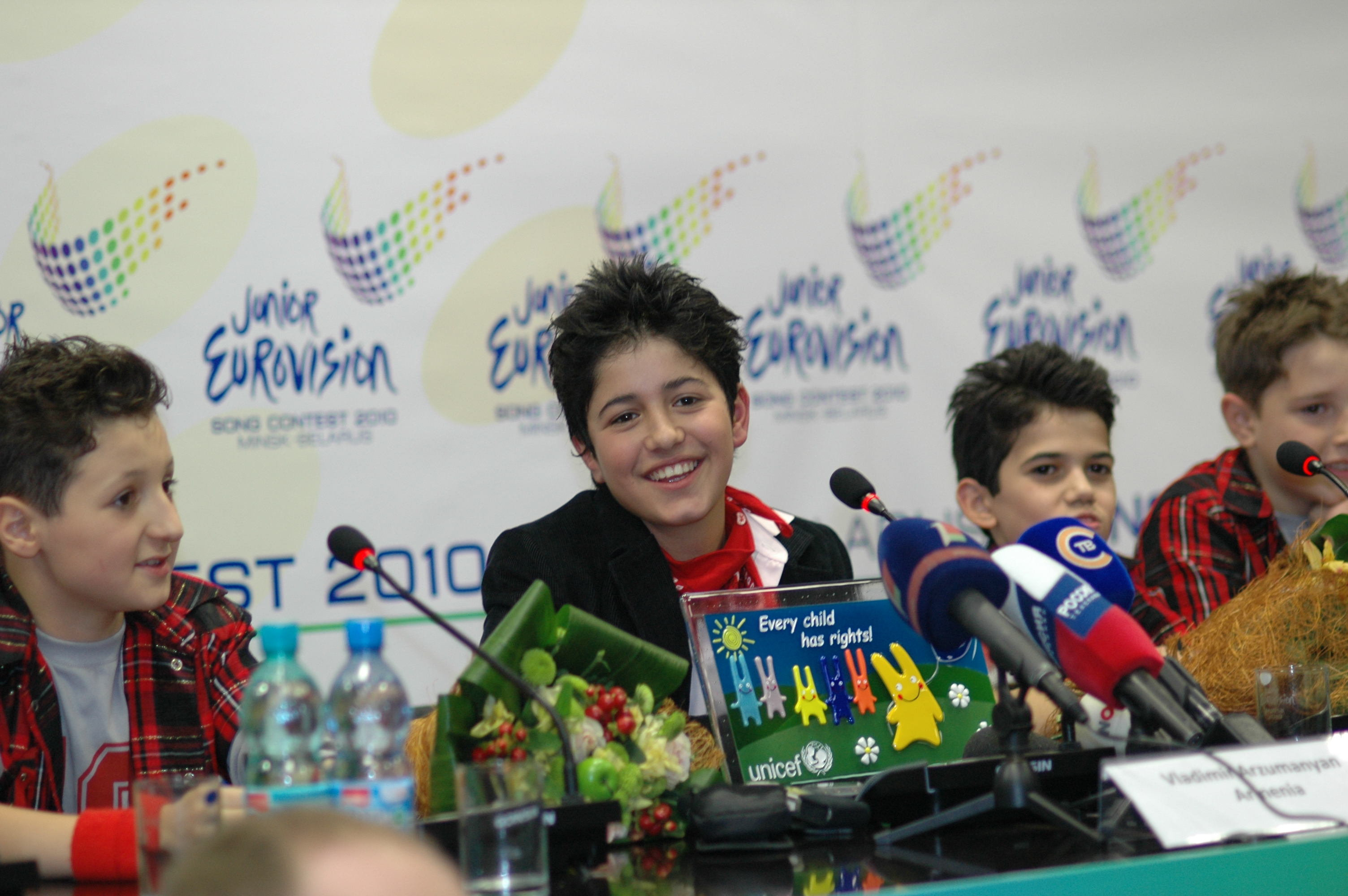
Vladimir Arzumanyan representing Armenia, who won the 2010 contest with the song "Mama"

The song must be written and sung in the national language (or one of the national languages) of the country being represented. However, they can also have a few lines in a different language. The same rule was in the adults' contest from 1966 to 1972 and again from 1977 to 1998. This rule was later changed in 2009 so that up to 25% of a song could be in a different language, usually English. This rule was changed again in 2017, now allowing up to 40% to be in a different language.

Originally the competition was open to children between the ages of 8 and 15, however in 2007 the age range was narrowed so that only children aged 10 to 15 on the day of the contest were allowed to enter. In 2016 the age range was changed again. From now on children aged 9 to 14 on the day of the contest are allowed to enter.

The song submitted into the contest cannot have previously been released commercially and must last 3 minutes at most. The rule stating that performers also must not have previously released music commercially was active from 2003 to 2006. This rule was dropped in 2007 thus allowing already experienced singers and bands in the competition. As a result, NRK chose to withdraw from the contest.

Since 2008, adults have been allowed to assist in the writing of entries. Previously, all writers had to be aged 10 to 15.

== Organisation ==
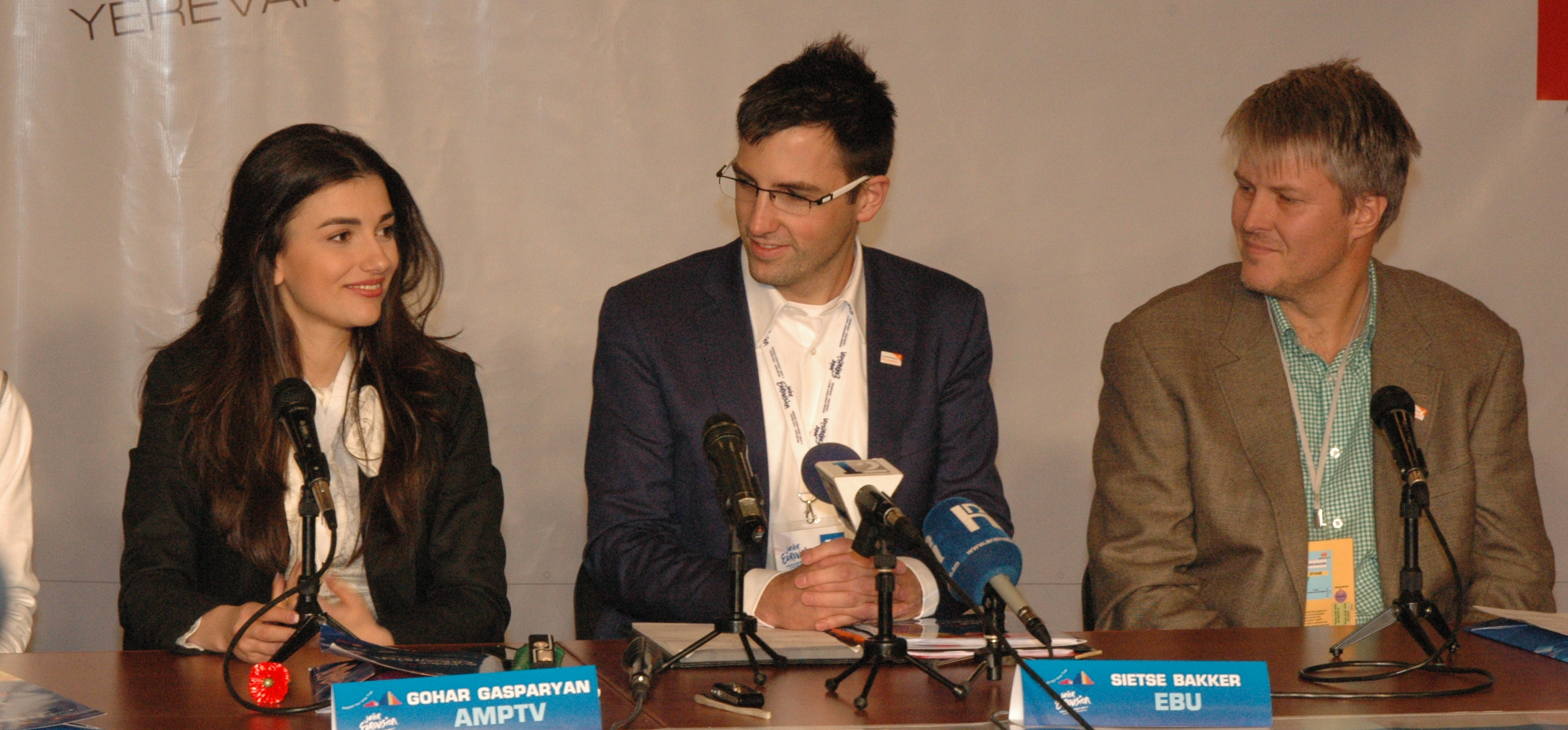
Sietse Bakker (center), executive supervisor from 2011 to 2012

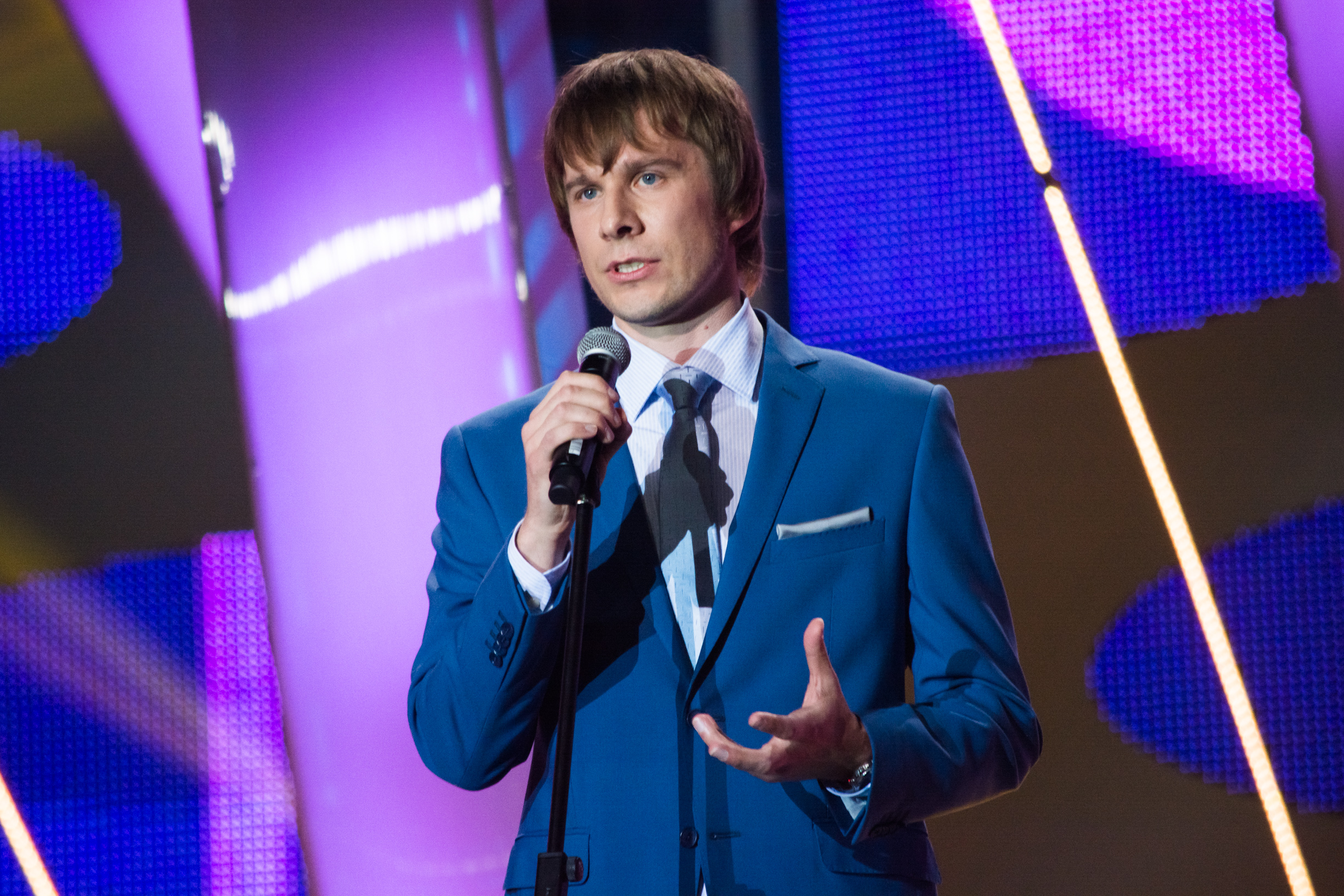
Vladislav Yakovlev, executive supervisor from 2013 to 2015

The contest is organised annually by the European Broadcasting Union (EBU), together with the host broadcaster in co-production with all the participating broadcasters. The first executive supervisor of the contest was Svante Stockselius, who also headed the Steering Group that decides on the rules of the contest, which broadcaster hosts the next contest and oversees the entire production of each programme. In 2011, he was succeeded by Sietse Bakker. In 2013, Vladislav Yakovlev took over the position. Yakovlev was dismissed without a clear reason after three contests, and was replaced by Jon Ola Sand, who had been Executive Supervisor for the Eurovision Song Contest since 2011. On 30 September 2019, Sand announced his intention to step down as Executive Supervisor and Head of Live Events after the Eurovision Song Contest 2020, which was later cancelled due to the COVID-19 pandemic. Martin Österdahl was named his successor, starting with the 2020 contest.

Steering Group meetings tend to include the Heads of Delegation whose principal job is to liaise between the EBU and the broadcaster they represent. It is also their duty to make sure that the performers are never left alone without an adult and to "create a team atmosphere amongst the [performers] and to develop their experience and a sense of community."

The table below lists all Executive Supervisors of the Junior Eurovision Song Contest since the first edition (2003):

Country	Name	Years
Sweden	Svante Stockselius	2003–2010
Netherlands	Sietse Bakker	2011–2012
Russia	Vladislav Yakovlev	2013–2015
Norway	Jon Ola Sand	2016–2019
Sweden	Martin Österdahl	2020–2024
Estonia	Gert Kark	2025–present

=== Junior Eurovision logo and theme ===
The 'singing girl' who formed part of the contest logo between 2003 and 2007

Logo used from 2008 to 2014

Logo used from 2015 to 2022

Logo used in 2023 and 2024

The former generic logo was introduced for the 2008 contest in Limassol, to create a consistent visual identity. Each year of the contest, the host broadcaster creates a sub-theme which is usually accompanied and expressed with a sub-logo and slogan.

The generic logo was revamped in March 2015, seven years after the first generic logo was created. The logo was used for the first time in the 2015 contest in Sofia. The "heart flag" symbol of the adult Eurovision Song Contest was added to the logo in 2023. Another revamp came in 2025.

=== Slogans ===
Each contest from 2005 to 2024 had a slogan, chosen by the host broadcaster. Based on the slogan, a theme and visual design are developed, as well as a common song to be performed by all participants during the show. From 2025 onwards, "United by Music" is the permanent slogan.

Year	Host country	Host city	Slogan	Common song
2005	Belgium	Hasselt	Let's Get Loud	—N/a
2006	Romania	Bucharest	Let the Music Play	—N/a
2007	Netherlands	Rotterdam	Make a Big Splash	"One World"
2008	Cyprus	Limassol	Fun in the Sun	"Hand in Hand"
2009	Ukraine	Kyiv	For the Joy of People	—N/a
2010	Belarus	Minsk	Feel the Magic	"A Day Without War" (Note: Performed together with Dmitry Koldun)
2011	Armenia	Yerevan	Reach for the Top!	—N/a
2012	Netherlands	Amsterdam	Break the Ice	"We Can Be Heroes"
2013	Ukraine	Kyiv	Be Creative	"Be Creative"
2014	Malta	Marsa	#Together	"Together"
2015	Bulgaria	Sofia	#Discover	"Discover"
2016	Malta	Valletta	Embrace	"We Are" (Note: Not to be confused with the competing Australian entry)
2017	Georgia	Tbilisi	Shine Bright	"Shine Bright" (Note: Performed as part of the flag parade)
2018	Belarus	Minsk	#LightUp	"#LightUp"
2019	Poland	Gliwice	Share the Joy	"Share the Joy"
2020	Poland	Warsaw	#MoveTheWorld	"Move the World"
2021	France	Paris	Imagine	"Imagine"
2022	Armenia	Yerevan	Spin the Magic	"Spin the Magic"
2023	France	Nice	Heroes	"Heroes"
2024	Spain	Madrid	Let’s Bloom	"Let's Bloom" (Note: Performed as part of the flag parade and alongside Zoé Clauzure, María Isabel and Sandra Valero)
2025	Georgia	Tbilisi	United by Music	"We're Rising High" (Note: Performed alongside Andria Putkaradze)
2026	Malta	Ta' Qali	Join the Festa (Note: While "United by Music" has been the permanent slogan of the contest since 2025, the Maltese host broadcaster PBS adopted "Join the Festa" as its motto for the 2026 edition specifically.)	"Join the Festa"

== Participation ==
Participation since 2003: Entered at least once Never entered, although eligible to do so Entry intended, but later withdrew Competed as a part of another country, but never as a sovereignty (Note: Kosovo has never participated in the contest. However, in the competition period 2005–2007, Kosovo was a province of Serbia, which itself was a constituent republic of participating country Serbia and Montenegro at the time of the Junior Eurovision Song Contest 2005.)

Participants in the Junior Eurovision Song Contest, coloured by decade of debut

All active member broadcasters of the EBU are permitted to take part in the contest, though the contest has been broadcast in several non-participating countries. Associate member broadcasters of the EBU may be eligible to compete, dependent on approval by the contest's steering group.

Participation in the contest tends to change dramatically each year. The original Scandinavian broadcasters left the contest in 2006 because they found the treatment of the contestants unethical, and revived the MGP Nordic competition, which had not been produced since the Junior Eurovision Song Contest began. The Netherlands is the only country to have taken part every year since the first contest in 2003. Kazakhstan and Wales are notable as the countries which have taken part in the Junior Eurovision but never in its adult counterpart (Wales being represented by the United Kingdom in the Eurovision Song Contest).

Broadcasters from 41 countries have competed at least once. Listed are all the countries that have taken part in the competition, alongside the year in which they made their debut:

Year	Country making its debut entry
2003	Belarus
2003	Belgium
2003	Croatia
2003	Cyprus
2003	Denmark
2003	Greece
2003	Latvia
2003	Malta
2003	Netherlands
2003	North Macedonia (Note: Before the Prespa agreement in 2018 presented as Former Yugoslav Republic of Macedonia.)
2003	Norway
2003	Poland
2003	Romania
2003	Spain
2003	Sweden
2003	United Kingdom

Year	Country making its debut entry
2004	France
2004	Switzerland
2005	Russia
2005	Serbia and Montenegro (Note: Serbia and Montenegro only participated once in 2005 and in the following year, the federation between the two countries was dissolved. Thus, Serbia continued to participate independently from 2006 and Montenegro was given the option to participate that year, which did not happen. Montenegro participated for the first time in 2014.)
2006	Portugal
2006	Serbia (Note: Participated as part of Serbia and Montenegro in 2005.)
2006	Ukraine
2007	Armenia
2007	Bulgaria
2007	Georgia
2007	Lithuania
2010	Moldova
2012	Albania
2012	Azerbaijan
2012	Israel
2013	San Marino

Year	Country making its debut entry
2014	Italy
2014	Montenegro
2014	Slovenia
2015	Australia (Note: Represented by an associate member broadcaster of the EBU that participates by special invitation.)
2015	Ireland
2018	Kazakhstan
2018	Wales (Note: Participated as part of the United Kingdom between 2003 and 2005 and in 2022 & 2023.)
2020	Germany
2023	Estonia

== Winning entries ==
Overall, songs from twelve countries have won the contest since the inaugural edition in 2003. Five countries have won the contest once: Croatia, Italy, Spain, Ukraine, and the Netherlands. Four have won the contest twice: Belarus, Malta, Poland and Russia. Armenia has won three times. France and Georgia have won the most editions, each winning four times. Both Croatia and Italy achieved their wins on their debut participation in the contest.

Year	Date	Host city	Entries	Country	Artist	Song	Points	Margin
2003	15 November	Copenhagen	16	Croatia	Dino Jelusić	"Ti si moja prva ljubav"	134	9
2004	20 November	Lillehammer	18	Spain	María Isabel	"Antes muerta que sencilla"	171	31
2005	26 November	Hasselt	16	Belarus	Ksenia Sitnik	"My vmeste" (Мы вместе)	149	3
2006	2 December	Bucharest	15	Russia	Tolmachevy Sisters	"Vesenniy jazz" (Весенний джаз)	154	25
2007	8 December	Rotterdam	17	Belarus	Alexey Zhigalkovich	"S druz'yami" (С друзьями)	137	1
2008	22 November	Limassol	15	Georgia	Bzikebi	"Bzz.."	154	19
2009	21 November	Kyiv	13	Netherlands	Ralf Mackenbach	"Click Clack"	121	5
2010	20 November	Minsk	14	Armenia	Vladimir Arzumanyan	"Mama" (Մամա)	120	1
2011	3 December	Yerevan	13	Georgia	Candy	"Candy Music"	108	5
2012	1 December	Amsterdam	12	Ukraine	Anastasiya Petryk	"Nebo" (Небо)	138	35
2013	30 November	Kyiv	12	Malta	Gaia Cauchi	"The Start"	130	9
2014	15 November	Marsa	16	Italy	Vincenzo Cantiello	"Tu primo grande amore"	159	12
2015	21 November	Sofia	17	Malta	Destiny Chukunyere	"Not My Soul"	185	9
2016	20 November	Valletta	17	Georgia	Mariam Mamadashvili	"Mzeo" (მზეო)	239	7
2017	26 November	Tbilisi	16	Russia	Polina Bogusevich	"Wings"	188	3
2018	25 November	Minsk	20	Poland	Roksana Węgiel	"Anyone I Want to Be"	215	12
2019	24 November	Gliwice	19	Poland	Viki Gabor	"Superhero"	278	51
2020	29 November	Warsaw	12	France	Valentina	"J'imagine"	200	48
2021	19 December	Paris	19	Armenia	Maléna	"Qami Qami" (Քամի Քամի)	224	6
2022	11 December	Yerevan	16	France	Lissandro	"Oh Maman!"	203	23
2023	26 November	Nice	16	France	Zoé Clauzure	"Cœur"	228	27
2024	16 November	Madrid	17	Georgia	Andria Putkaradze	"To My Mom"	239	26
2025	13 December	Tbilisi	18	France	Lou Deleuze	"Ce monde"	248	71
2026	24 October	Ta' Qali	16	Armenia	Naré	"Boo!"	202	18

== Interval acts and guest appearances ==
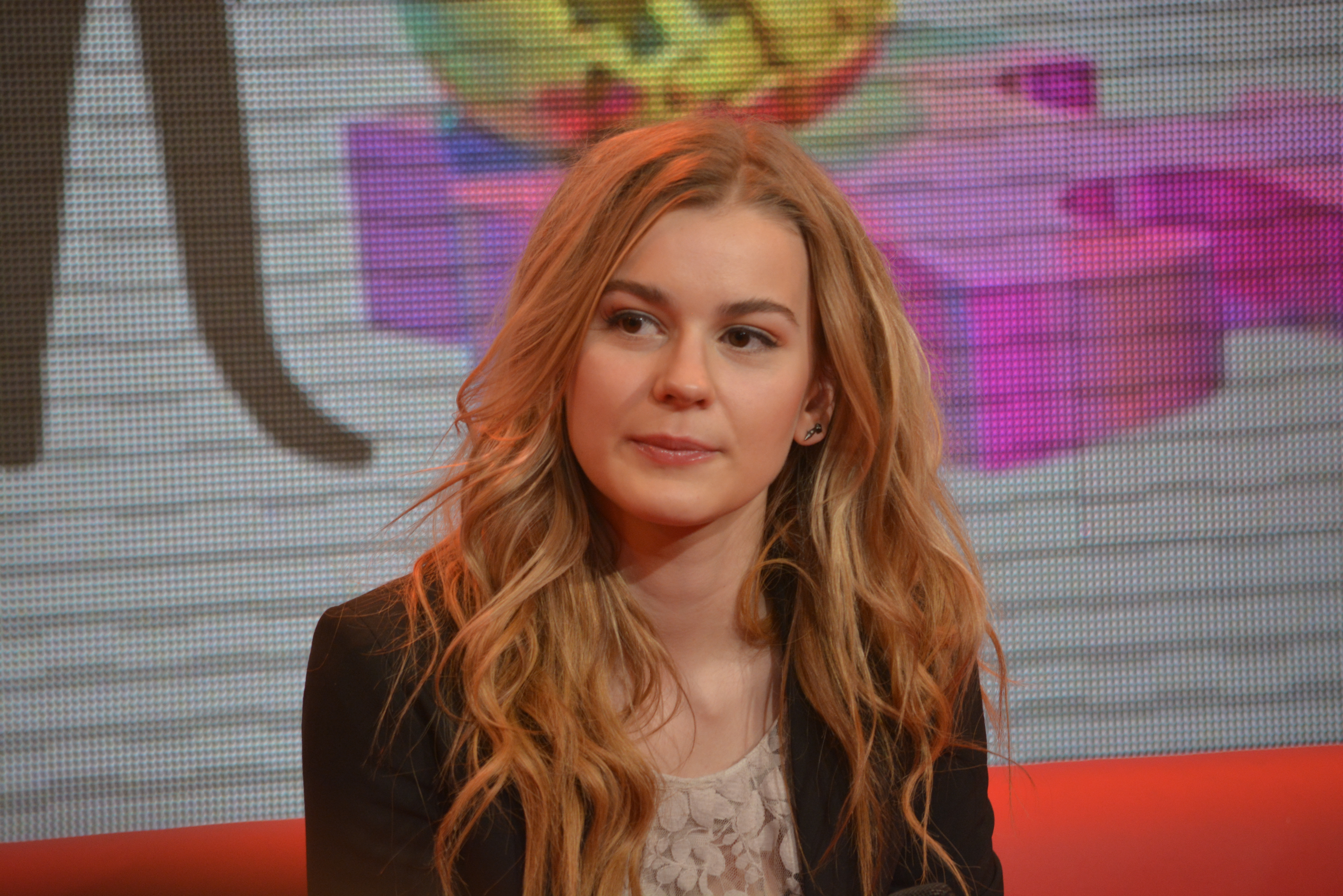
Emmelie de Forest at a JESC press conference in Kyiv, Ukraine (2013)

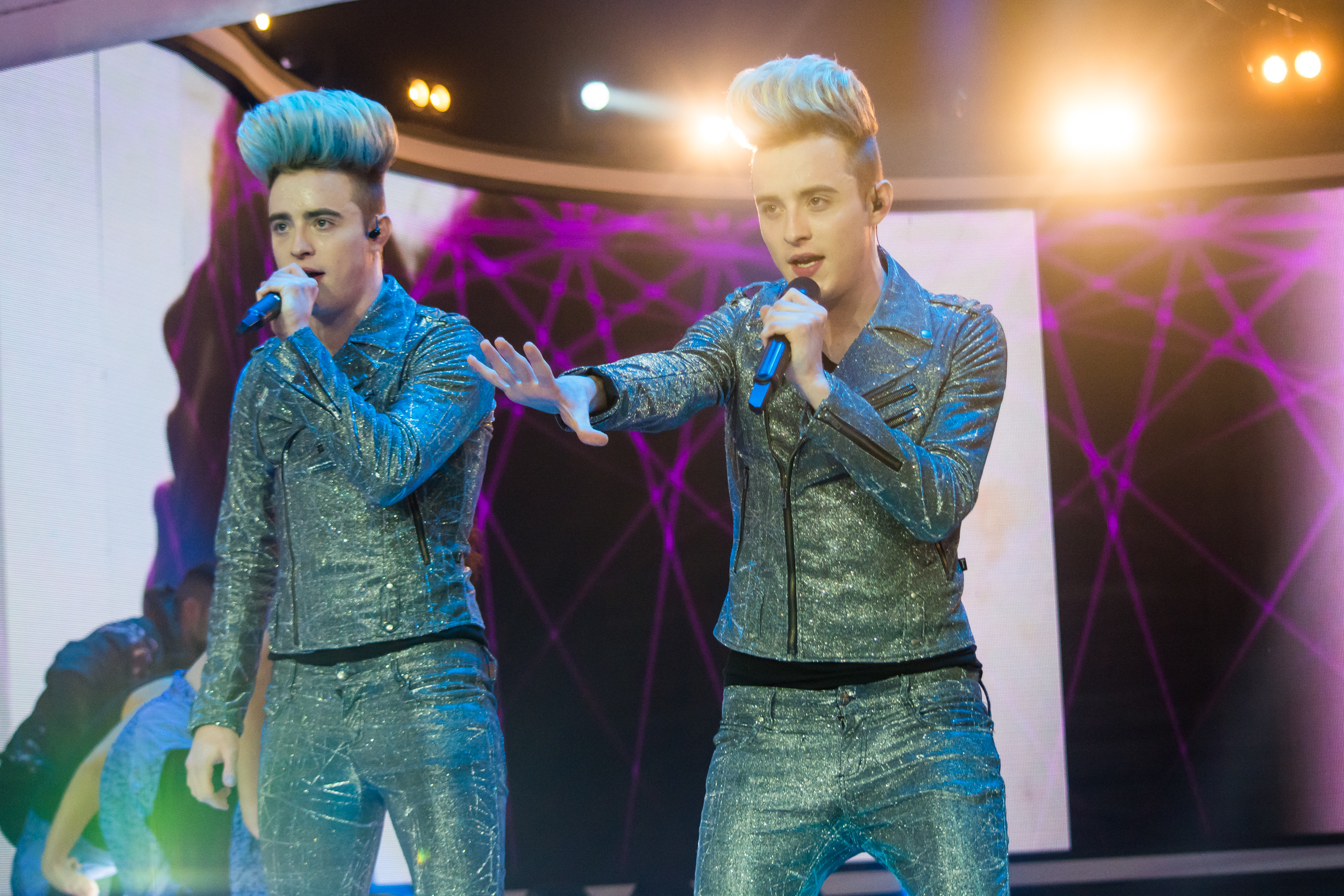
Jedward on stage performing "Hologram" during the interval in 2016

The tradition of interval acts between the songs in the competition programme and the announcement of the voting has been established since the inaugural contest in 2003. Interval entertainment has included such acts as girl group Sugababes and rock band Busted (2003), Westlife in 2004, juggler Vladik Myagkostupov from the world-renowned Cirque du Soleil (2005) and singer Katie Melua in 2007.

Former Eurovision Song Contest participants and winners have also performed as interval acts, such as Dima Bilan and Evridiki in 2008, Ani Lorak (2009), Alexander Rybak in 2010 and Sirusho (2011). Emmelie de Forest and the co-host that year, Zlata Ognevich, performed in 2013. 2015 host Poli Genova and Jedward were two of the interval acts in 2016. 2019 winner Duncan Laurence and the intended 2020 Polish entrant Alicja Szemplińska performed as interval acts in the 2020 contest, with the former having his appearance inserted via chroma keying. 2021 French entrant Barbara Pravi, 2022 Armenian entrant Rosa Linn and 2016 French entrant Amir did the same in the 2021, 2022 and 2023 editions respectively.

The winners of Junior Eurovision from 2003 to 2009 performed a medley of their entries together on stage during the 2010 interval. As part of the 2022 interval, 11 previous winners performed in a medley of all the winning songs to date, for the occasion of the 20th edition of the event; the other eight winning songs were performed by the Tavush Diocese Children's Choir.

The previous winner has performed on a number of occasions since 2005, and from 2013 all participants have performed a "common song" together on stage during the interval. Similar performances took place in 2007 and 2010 with the specially-commissioned UNICEF songs "One World" and "A Day Without War" respectively, the latter with Dmitry Koldun. The official charity song for the 2012 contest was "We Can Be Heroes", the money from the sales of which went to the Dutch children's charity KidsRights Foundation.

The 2008 event in Limassol, Cyprus finished with the presenters inviting everyone on stage to sing "Hand in Hand", which was written especially for UNICEF and the Junior Eurovision Song Contest that year.

Ruslana was invited to perform at the 2013 contest, which took place in her country's capital Kyiv. However, on the day of the contest she withdrew from the show, in protest against disproportionate violence used against protesters during the Euromaidan.

Since 2004, the opening of the show has included a "Parade of Nations" or the "Flag Parade", similar to the Olympic Games opening ceremony. The parade was featured in some previous editions of the adult Eurovision Song Contest until its official adoption in 2013.

== Eurovision Song Contest ==
Below is a list of former participants of the Junior Eurovision Song Contest who have gone on to compete in the Eurovision Song Contest. The adult contest, from 2014 to 2023 and again in 2026, also invited the previous year's Junior Eurovision winner as a featured guest.

Country	JESC year	Participant	ESC year	Notes
Armenia	2008	Monica Manucharova	2018	Backing vocalist for Sevak Khanagyan
Georgia	2011	Iru Khechanovi (Note: As a member of Candy)	2023	Competed with "Echo" which placed twelfth in the second semi-final
Georgia	2008	Bzikebi	2026	Competed with "On Replay" which placed fifteenth (last) in the first semi-final
Lithuania	2007	Ieva Zasimauskaitė (Note: As a backing vocalist for Lina Joy)	2018	Competed with "When We're Old" which placed twelfth in the final
Malta	2015	Destiny Chukunyere	2019	Backing vocalist for Michela
Malta	2015	Destiny Chukunyere	2020	Was due to compete with "All of My Love" before the contest's cancellation
Malta	2015	Destiny Chukunyere	2021	Competed with "Je me casse" which placed seventh in the final
Netherlands	2007	OG3NE (Note: As Lisa, Amy and Shelley)	2017	Competed with "Lights and Shadows" which placed eleventh in the final
Netherlands	2016	Stefania Liberakakis (Note: As a member of Kisses)	2020	Was due to represent Greece with "Supergirl" before the contest's cancellation
Netherlands	2016	Stefania Liberakakis	2021	Represented Greece with "Last Dance" which placed tenth in the final
Poland	2004	Weronika Bochat (Note: As a member of KWADro)	2010	Backing vocalist for Marcin Mroziński
Russia	2006	Tolmachevy Sisters	2014	Competed with "Shine" which placed seventh in the final
San Marino	2013	Michele Perniola	2015	Competed as a duet performing "Chain of Lights" which placed sixteenth in the second semi-final
San Marino	2014	Anita Simoncini (Note: As a member of The Peppermints)	2015	Competed as a duet performing "Chain of Lights" which placed sixteenth in the second semi-final
Serbia	2007	Nevena Božović	2013	Competed as a member of Moje 3 with "Ljubav je svuda" which placed eleventh in the first semi-final
Serbia	2007	Nevena Božović	2019	Competed with "Kruna" which placed eighteenth in the final
