= List of Junior Eurovision Song Contest host cities =

Host cities of the Junior Eurovision Song Contest: A single contest / Multiple contests

20 venues in 15 countries have hosted the Junior Eurovision Song Contest, an annual song competition for children, at least once since its creation in 2003. The first edition took place in Copenhagen, Denmark. Following the hosting problems for the 2004 edition, the location of the subsequent contests were appointed by the European Broadcasting Union (EBU), following a bidding process among the participating broadcasters. The broadcasters from Belgium were therefore the first to successfully bid for the rights to host the contest in 2005. Poland became the first country to host two contests in a row (in 2019 and in 2020, respectively).

Originally, unlike its adult version, the winning broadcaster does not receive the rights to host the next contest. However from 2014 to 2021 (excluding 2018), the winning broadcaster had first refusal on hosting the next competition. Radiotelevisione italiana (RAI) used this clause in 2015 to decline hosting the contest that year after their victory for Italy in 2014.

The cities that have hosted multiple times are Kyiv (2009 and 2013), Minsk (2010 and 2018), Yerevan (2011 and 2022) and Tbilisi (2017 and 2025)

== Contests ==
Future contests are shown in italics.

Contests	Country	City	Venue	Years	Ref(s)
3	Malta	Marsa	Malta Shipbuilding	2014	
3	Malta	Valletta	Mediterranean Conference Centre	2016	
3	Malta	Ta'Qali	Malta Fairs & Conventions Centre	2026	
2	Netherlands	Rotterdam	Ahoy	2007	
2	Netherlands	Amsterdam	Heineken Music Hall	2012	
2	Ukraine	Kyiv	Palace of Sports	2009	
2	Ukraine	Kyiv	Palace "Ukraine"	2013	
2	Belarus	Minsk	Minsk Arena	2010	
2	Belarus	Minsk	Minsk Arena	2018	
2	Poland	Gliwice	Gliwice Arena	2019	
2	Poland	Warsaw	Studio 5, TVP Headquarters	2020	
2	Armenia	Yerevan	Karen Demirchyan Complex	2011	
2	Armenia	Yerevan	Karen Demirchyan Complex	2022	
2	France	Paris	La Seine Musicale	2021	
2	France	Nice	Palais Nikaïa	2023	
2	Georgia	Tbilisi	Olympic Palace	2017	
2	Georgia	Tbilisi	Gymnastic Hall of Olympic City	2025	
1	Denmark	Copenhagen	Forum Copenhagen	2003	
1	Norway	Lillehammer	Håkons Hall	2004	
1	Belgium	Hasselt	Ethias Arena	2005	
1	Romania	Bucharest	Sala Polivalentă	2006	
1	Cyprus	Limassol	Spyros Kyprianou Athletic Center	2008	
1	Bulgaria	Sofia	Arena Sofia	2015	
1	Spain	Madrid	Caja Mágica	2024	

== Opening ceremony venue ==
Year	Venue	Ref.
2014	Verdala Palace	
2015	National Palace of Culture	
2016	Manoel Theatre	
2017	National Parliamentary Library of Georgia	
2018	BelExpo Exhibition Centre	
2019	Silesian Theatre	
2020	Studio 5, TVP Headquarters	
2021	Studio Gabriel	
2022	Republic Square, Yerevan	
2023	Hotel Negresco	

== Bids ==
=== 2000s ===
Year	Bid party		Result
Year	City	Country	Result
2003	Copenhagen	Denmark	Awarded to host the 2003 contest (sole bid)
2004	~~Manchester~~	~~United Kingdom~~	Originally awarded to host the 2004 contest, but pulled out due to finance and scheduling problems
2004	~~Zagreb~~	~~Croatia~~	Originally awarded to replace Manchester in hosting the 2004 contest, but broadcaster HRT reportedly forgot that the prospective venue for the event was already booked for the period the contest was to take place
2004	Lillehammer	Norway	Inherently awarded to host the 2004 contest
2005	Hasselt	Belgium	Awarded to host the 2005 contest
2005	Amsterdam	Netherlands	Not selected to host the contest
2005	Zagreb	Croatia	Not selected to host the contest
2005	Two unknown applicants		Not selected to host the contest
2006	Bucharest	Romania	Awarded to host the 2006 contest
2006	Amsterdam	Netherlands	Not selected to host the contest
2006	Zagreb	Croatia	Not selected to host the contest
2007	Rotterdam	Netherlands	Awarded to host the 2007 contest
2007	Limassol	Cyprus	Not selected to host the contest
2007	Zagreb	Croatia	Not selected to host the contest
2008	Limassol	Cyprus	Awarded to host the 2008 contest
2008	Kyiv	Ukraine	Not selected to host the contest
2008	Stockholm	Sweden	Not selected to host the contest
2008	Lisbon	Portugal	Withdrew their bid to host the contest
2009	Kyiv	Ukraine	Awarded to host the 2009 contest
2009	Belgrade	Serbia	Not selected to host the contest
2009	Gurzuf	Ukraine	Not selected to host the contest
2009	Minsk	Belarus	Not selected to host the contest
2009	Stockholm	Sweden	Withdrew their bid to host the contest

=== 2010s ===
Year	Bid party		Result
Year	City	Country	Result
2010	Minsk	Belarus	Awarded to host the 2010 contest
2010	Moscow	Russia	Not selected to host the contest
2010	Valletta	Malta	Not selected to host the contest
2011	Yerevan	Armenia	Awarded to host the 2011 contest
2011	Stockholm	Sweden	Not selected to host the contest
2011	Unconfirmed applicants		Not selected to host the contest
2012	Amsterdam	Netherlands	Awarded to host the 2012 contest
2013	Kyiv	Ukraine	Awarded to host the 2013 contest
2014	Malta (Note: Although the venue itself is located in the Maltese town Marsa, the Junior Eurovision Executive Supervisor, Vladislav Yakovlev, stated on 18 December 2013 that there would be "no host city - but a host island".)	Malta	Awarded to host the 2014 contest (sole bid)
2015	Sofia	Bulgaria	Awarded to host the 2015 contest
2015	Valletta	Malta	Not selected to host the contest
2016	Valletta	Malta	Awarded to host the 2016 contest (sole bid)
2017	Tbilisi	Georgia	Awarded to host the 2017 contest (sole bid)
2018	Minsk	Belarus	Awarded to host the 2018 contest (sole bid)
2019	Gliwice	Poland	Awarded to host the 2019 contest
2019	Szczecin	Poland	Shortlisted
2019	Toruń	Poland	Shortlisted
2019	Astana	Kazakhstan	Not selected to host the contest
2019	Gdańsk	Poland	Not selected to host the contest
2019	Katowice	Poland	Not selected to host the contest
2019	Kraków	Poland	Not selected to host the contest
2019	Łódź	Poland	Not selected to host the contest
2019	Yerevan	Armenia	Not selected to host the contest

=== 2020s ===
Year	Bid party		Result
Year	City	Country	Result
2020	Warsaw	Poland	Awarded to host the 2020 contest
2020	Kraków	Poland	Not selected to host the contest
2021	Paris	France	Awarded to host the 2021 contest (sole bid)
2022	Yerevan	Armenia	Awarded to host the 2022 contest (sole bid)
2023	Nice	France	Awarded to host the 2023 contest (sole bid)
2024	Madrid	Spain	Awarded to host the 2024 contest
2024	Granada	Spain	Not selected to host the contest
2024	Málaga	Spain	Not selected to host the contest
2024	Valencia	Spain	Not selected to host the contest
2024	Barcelona	Spain	Withdrew their bid to host the contest
2024	Zaragoza	Spain	Withdrew their bid to host the contest
2025	Tbilisi	Georgia	Awarded to host the 2025 contest (sole bid)
2026	Attard	Malta	Awarded to host the 2026 contest
2026	Skopje	North Macedonia	Not selected to host
2026	Unknown	San Marino	Not selected to host

== Gallery ==
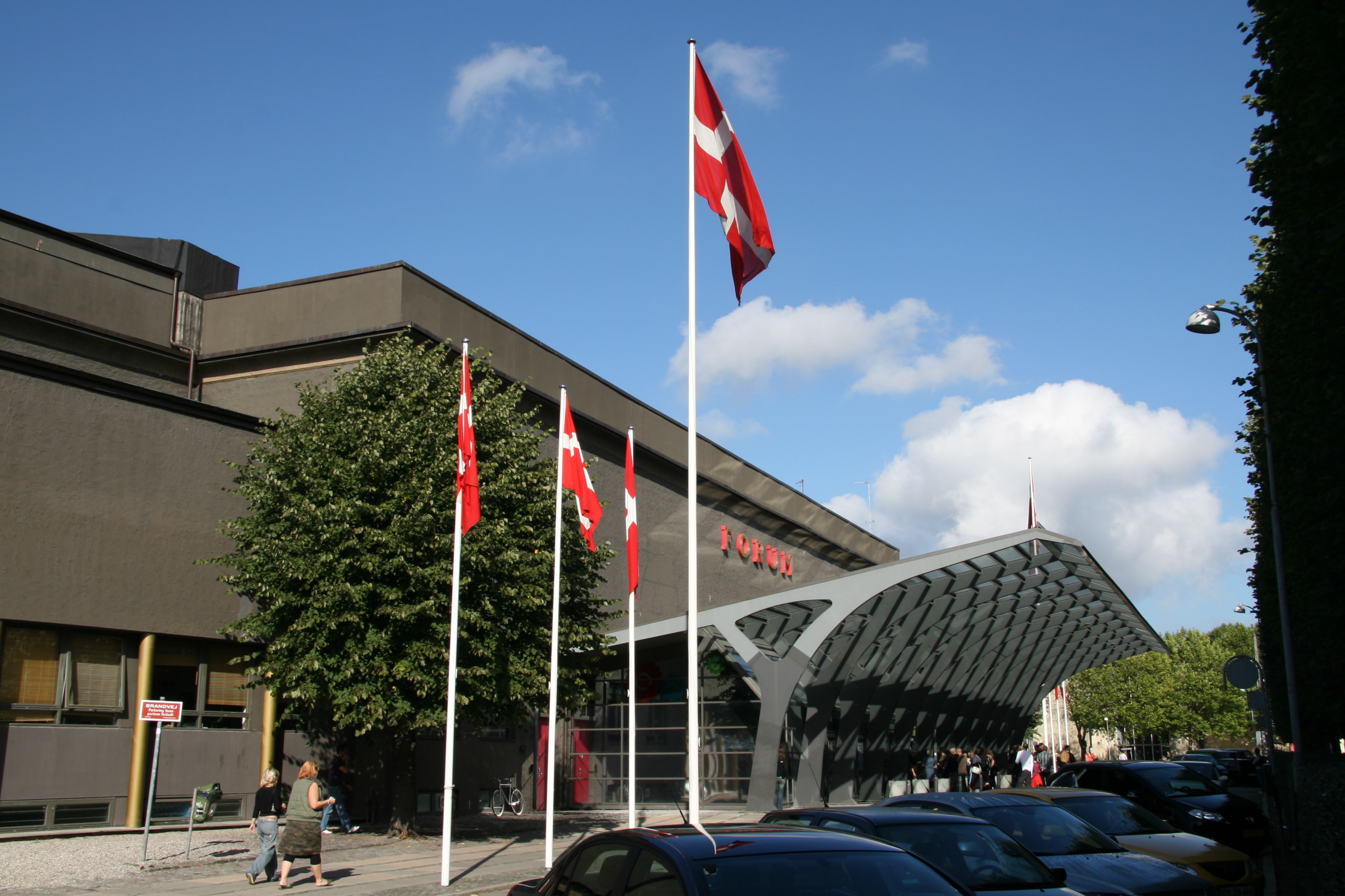
Forum Copenhagen in Copenhagen, Denmark hosted the 2003 Contest.

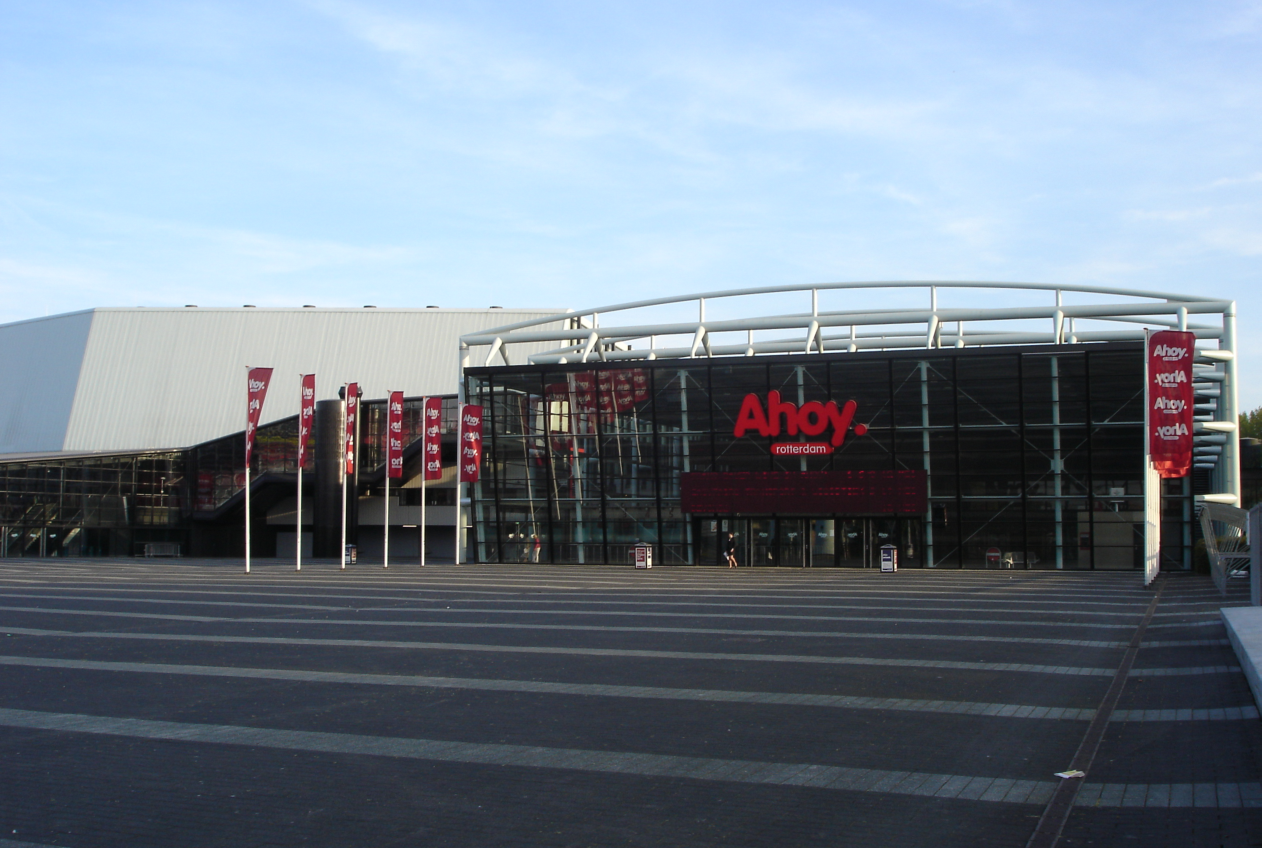
Ahoy in Rotterdam, Netherlands hosted the 2007 Contest.

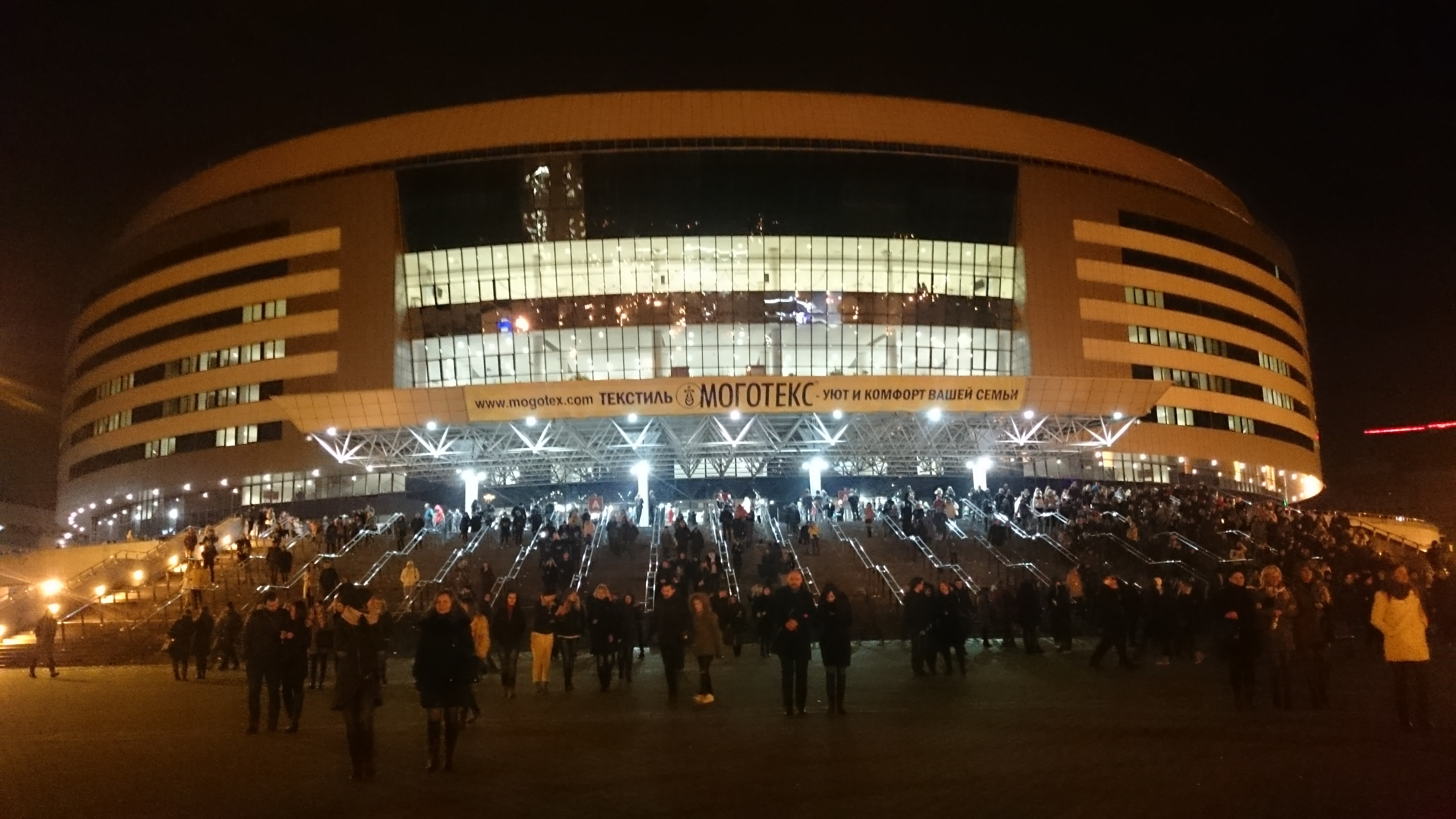
Minsk Arena in Minsk, Belarus hosted the contest in 2010 and 2018.

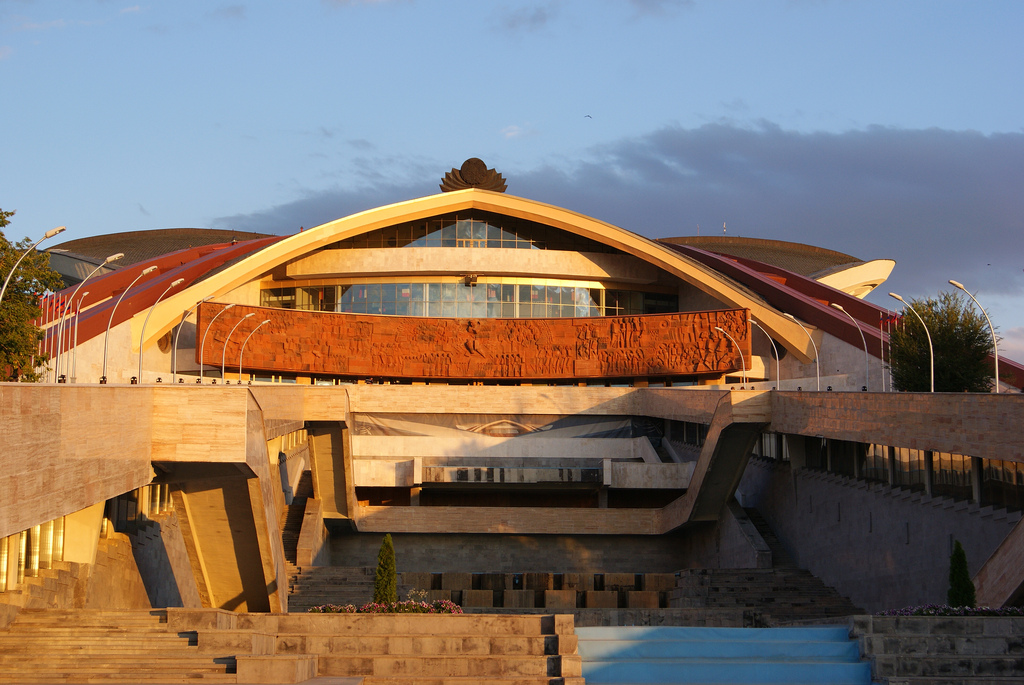
Karen Demirchyan Sports and Concerts Complex in Yerevan, Armenia hosted the contest in 2011 and 2022.

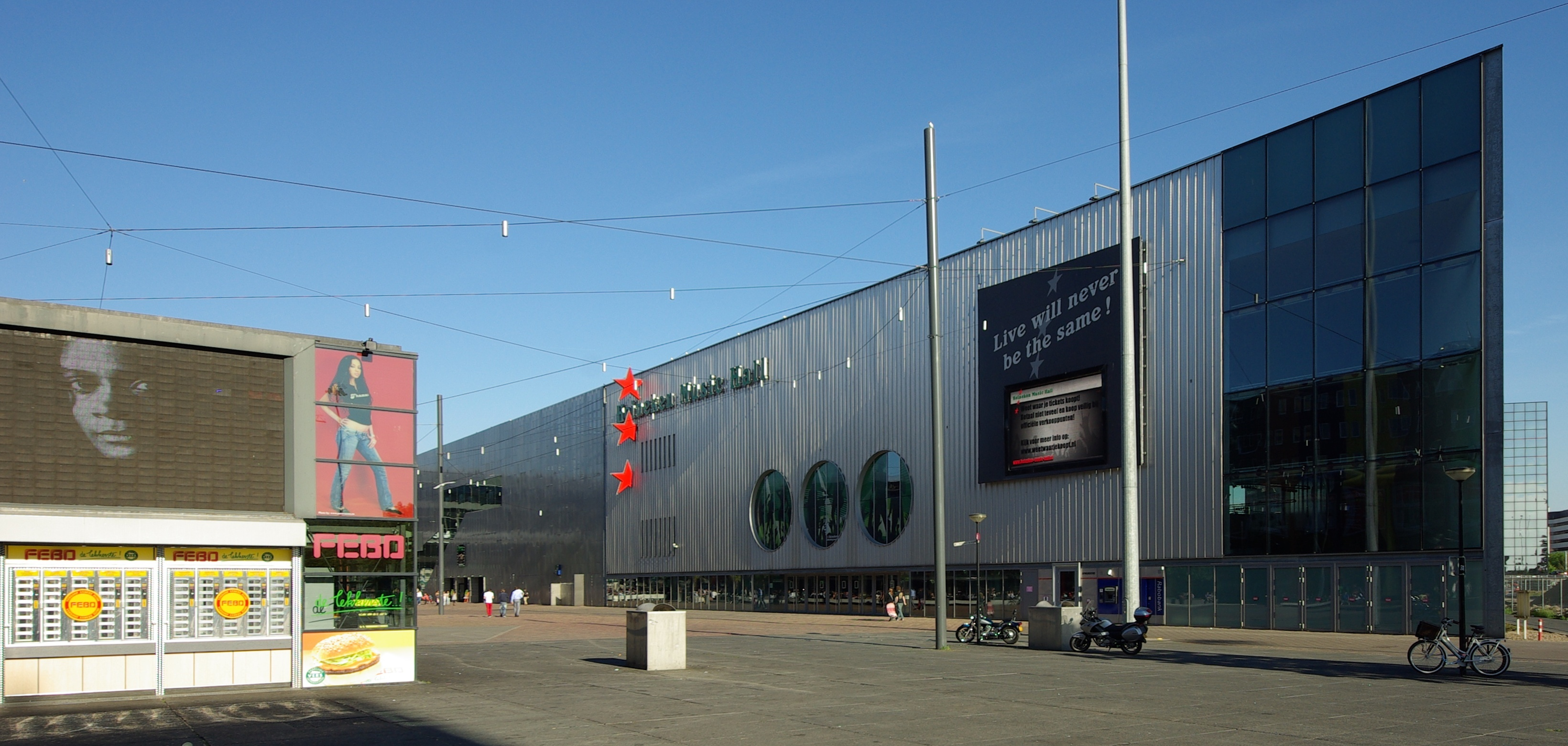
Heineken Music Hall in Amsterdam, Netherlands hosted the 2012 Contest.

Arena Armeec in Sofia, Bulgaria hosted the 2015 Contest.

== See also ==
- List of ABU Song Festivals host cities
- List of Eurovision Song Contest host cities
