= Zoé Clauzure =

French child singer and actress (born 2010)

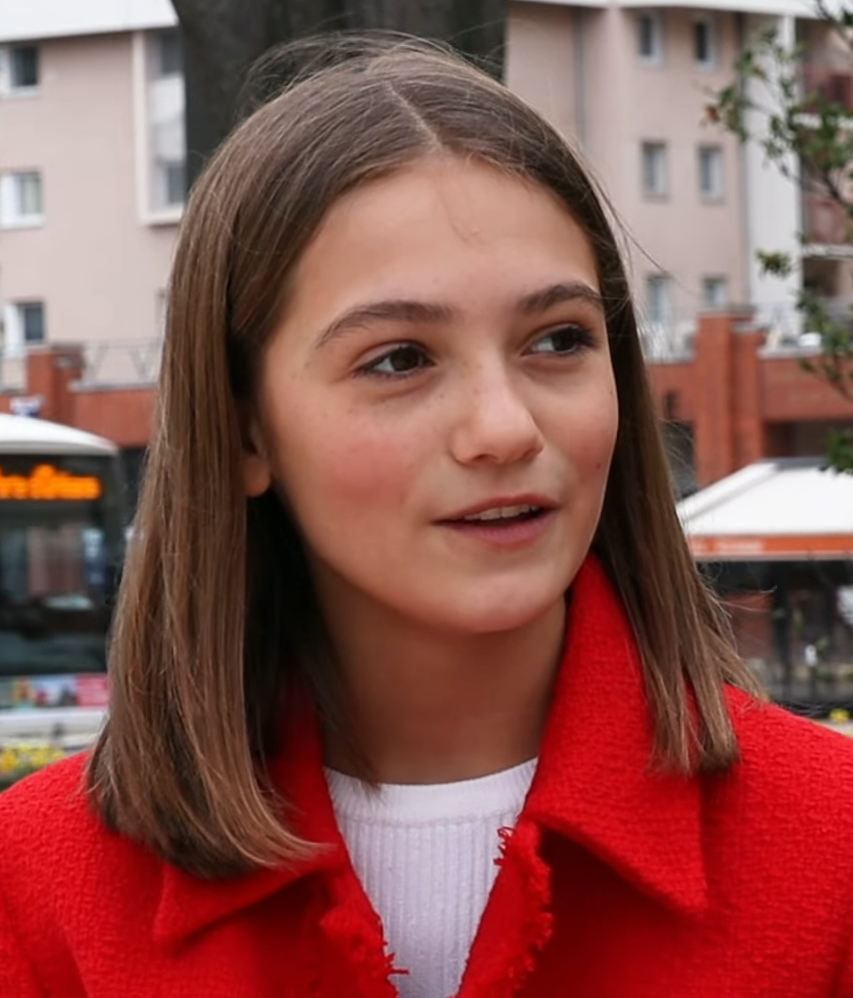
- Clauzure in 2024

Background information
- Born: 12 February 2010 (age 16); Montrouge, France
- Origin: France
- Genres: Chanson; French pop
- Occupations: Singer; musician; actress
- Instruments: Vocals; piano
- Years active: 2019–present
- Labels: Warner Music France; Parlophone France
- Website: www.zoeclauzure.com www.zoeclauzure-musique.com

YouTube information
- Channel: zoe_clauzure
- Years active: 2020–present
- Genre: Music
- Subscribers: 124 thousand
- Views: 86.2 million
- Last updated: 28 February 2026

Zoé Clauzure (French pronunciation: [zɔe klozyʁ]; born 12 February 2010) is a French child singer and actress best known for winning the Junior Eurovision Song Contest 2023 with the song "Cœur". Previously, in 2020, she had reached the semi-finals of the seventh season of the French version of The Voice Kids.

== Career ==
Clauzure was discovered in 2019 during the seventh season of The Voice Kids France (broadcast in 2020). In the blind auditions, she sang "Homeless" by Marina Kaye. Of the four judges, only Soprano turned his seat for her and took her in his team, bringing her all the way to the semi-finals. "You have a Vanessa Paradis charisma, you are already a star," he said when choosing Zoé for the semis, where she sang "Je sais pas" by Céline Dion and wasn't chosen by him to advance.

In November, she released a single titled "Ma place", for which she wrote the lyrics together with Bernard Clapot.

In October 2021, she released an album Les Fables de La Fontaine en chansons en chansons (meaning "La Fontaine's Fables in song form") as part of the singing group We Are World Citizens, composed of children from past seasons of The Voice Kids.

In 2022, she released a solo single titled "Dans les nuages". The single and the accompanying music video were a prize for winning the Billieblush Academy, a singing contest for girls below the age of 13, organized by the clothes mark Billieblush.

In 2025, she was named as one of the Girls of the Year by Time magazine.

=== Junior Eurovision Song Contest 2023 ===
On 27 September 2023, France Télévisions announced having selected Zoé with a song titled "Cœur" to represent France at the Junior Eurovision Song Contest 2023 that would be held in Nice, France on 26 November. On the same day, the song was released as a single.

The song is about school bullying. The lyrics encourage the listeners to "move forward towards victory", even if there were people wanting to see you fail.

On 26 November, Zoé won the Junior Eurovision with a total of 228 points, 27 points ahead of second-placed Spain. This was France's second consecutive and third overall victory at the contest. The result also made France the second country to win on home soil and two consecutive contests, following Poland in 2019.

== Discography ==
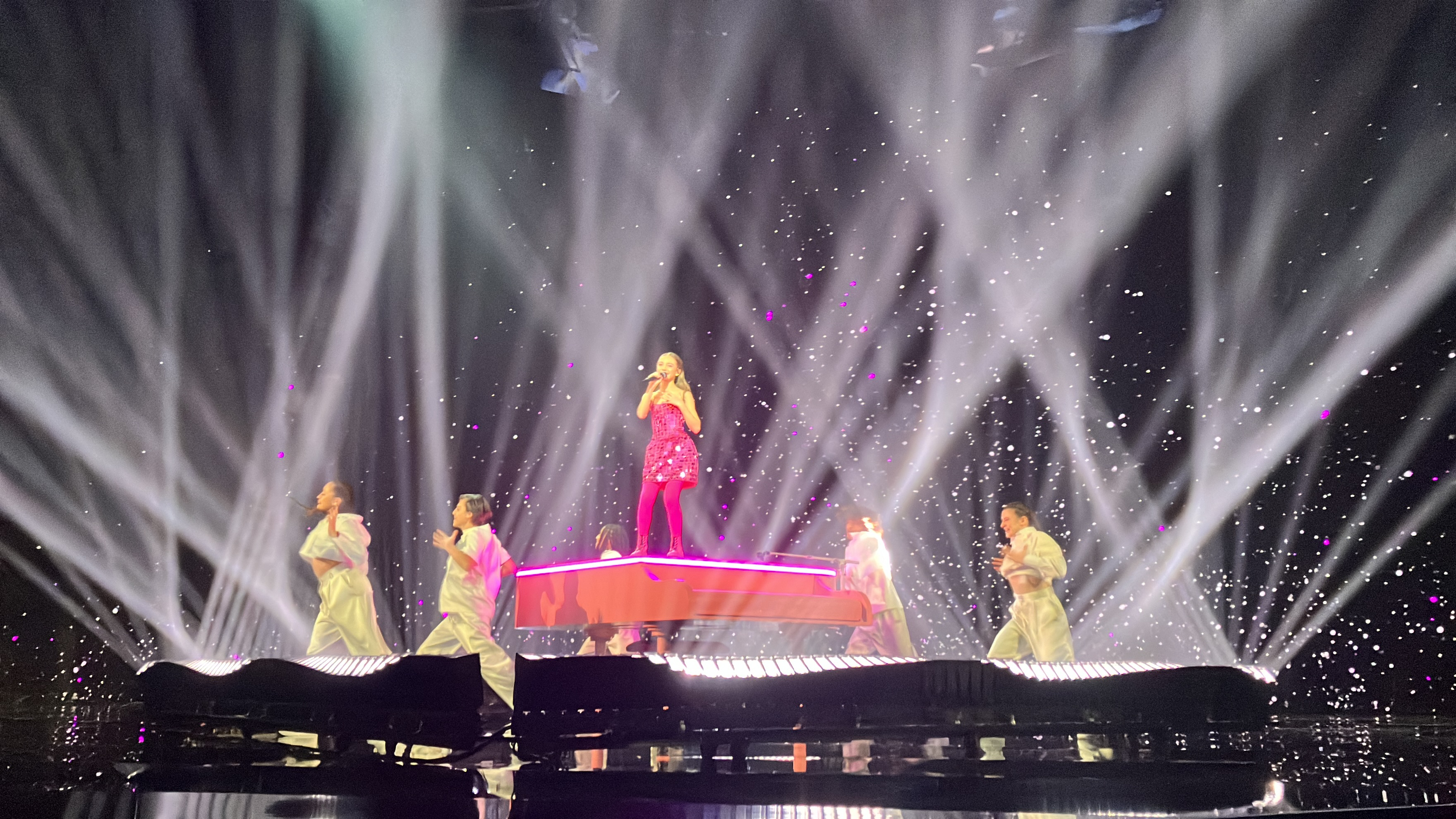
Clauzure performing at the Junior Eurovision Song Contest 2023

=== Albums ===
Title	Album details
Les Fables de La Fontaine en chansons (as a member of the band We Are World Citizens)	Released: 29 October 2021; Label: Joyvox / Sony Music Entertainment France; Formats: CD, download, streaming
Elles chantent Dorothée (as Zoé, with Chloé and Maya)	Released: 1 July 2022; Label: Mediawan / Universal Music France; Formats: CD, download, streaming

=== Singles ===
Year	Title
2020	"Ma place" (with Bernard Clapot)
2021	"Hey vous les grands" (as Zoé, with Timéo and feat. Les Frimousses)
2022	"Dans les nuages" (as Zoé)
2023	"Cœur"
2025	"Invisible"
2026	"Balance"

== Filmography ==
=== Television ===
Year	Title	Role	Notes
2024	Cat's Eyes	Teenage Tamara Chamade	TV series

Awards and achievements
Preceded by Lissandro with "Oh Maman !"	Winner of the Junior Eurovision Song Contest; 2023	Succeeded by Andria Putkaradze with "To My Mom"
Preceded by Lissandro with "Oh Maman !"	France in the Junior Eurovision Song Contest; 2023	Succeeded by Titouan with "Comme ci Comme ça"
