= Junior Eurovision Song Contest 2023 =

21st edition of international song competition

- Heroes

Date and venue
- Final: 26 November 2023
- Venue: Palais Nikaïa; Nice, France

Organisation
- Organiser: European Broadcasting Union (EBU)
- Executive supervisor: Martin Österdahl

Production
- Host broadcaster: France Télévisions
- Directors: Julian Gutierrez; Franck Broqua
- Executive producer: Alexandra Redde-Amiel
- Presenters: Olivier Minne; Laury Thilleman; Ophenya

Participants
- Number of entries: 16
- Debuting countries: Estonia
- Returning countries: Germany
- Non-returning countries: Kazakhstan; Serbia
- Participation map: Competing countries Countries that participated in the past but not in 2023

Vote
- Voting system: The professional jury of each country awards a set of 12, 10, 8–1 points to 10 songs. Viewers around the world vote for 3 songs, and their votes are distributed proportionally. The votes of the jury and the audience make up 50% of all votes.
- Winning song: France "Cœur"

The Junior Eurovision Song Contest 2023 was the 21st edition of the Junior Eurovision Song Contest, held on 26 November 2023 at the Palais Nikaïa in Nice, France, and presented by Olivier Minne, Laury Thilleman, and Ophenya. It was organised by the European Broadcasting Union (EBU) and host broadcaster France Télévisions, who staged the event after winning the 2022 contest for France with the song "Oh Maman !" by Lissandro. This was the second time that the Junior Eurovision Song Contest was hosted in France, the first being in Paris in 2021.

Broadcasters from sixteen countries participated in the contest, with Estonia participating for the first time and Germany returning after its absence from the previous edition, while Kazakhstan and Serbia did not take part. This was also the first and so far only time that all members of the "Big Five" from the Eurovision Song Contest took part in the junior contest together.

The winner was France with the song "Cœur" by Zoé Clauzure, making France the second country to win the Junior Eurovision Song Contest twice in a row, after Poland. The result also marked France equaling Georgia's record for the most Junior Eurovision victories to date. Spain, Armenia, the United Kingdom and Ukraine completed the top five. Further down the table, Germany achieved its best result to date, Georgia tied its worst placement, and Ireland placed last for the first time.

== Location ==
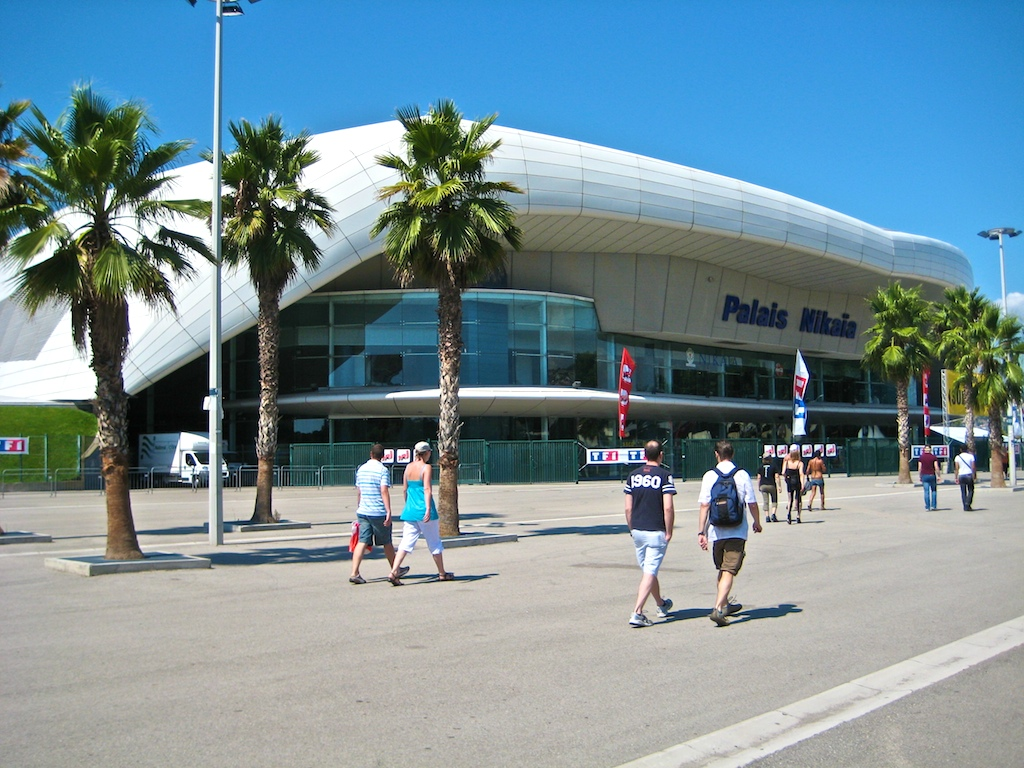
Palais Nikaïa, host venue of the 2023 contest.

The contest took place at the Palais Nikaïa in Nice, a multi-purpose concert hall, following the country's victory at the 2022 contest with the song "Oh Maman !" by Lissandro. This was the second time that France hosted the Junior Eurovision Song Contest, the first being in Paris in 2021.

=== Bidding phase and host city selection ===
Location of the selected host city (in blue)

Unlike in the Eurovision Song Contest, the winning country did not receive the automatic rights to host the next contest. However, since 2019, each contest has been hosted by the previous year's winning country, and since 2011 (with the exceptions of 2012 and 2018), the winning country has had the right of first refusal on hosting the following competition. In 2015, Italy was given the option to host but ultimately opted out of it.

Following France's win in 2022, French head of delegation Alexandra Redde-Amiel and Director General of France Télévisions Delphine Ernotte revealed that the country wishes to host the contest in 2023. On 3 April 2023, the EBU and France Télévisions announced that the contest would be held in Nice.

== Participants ==
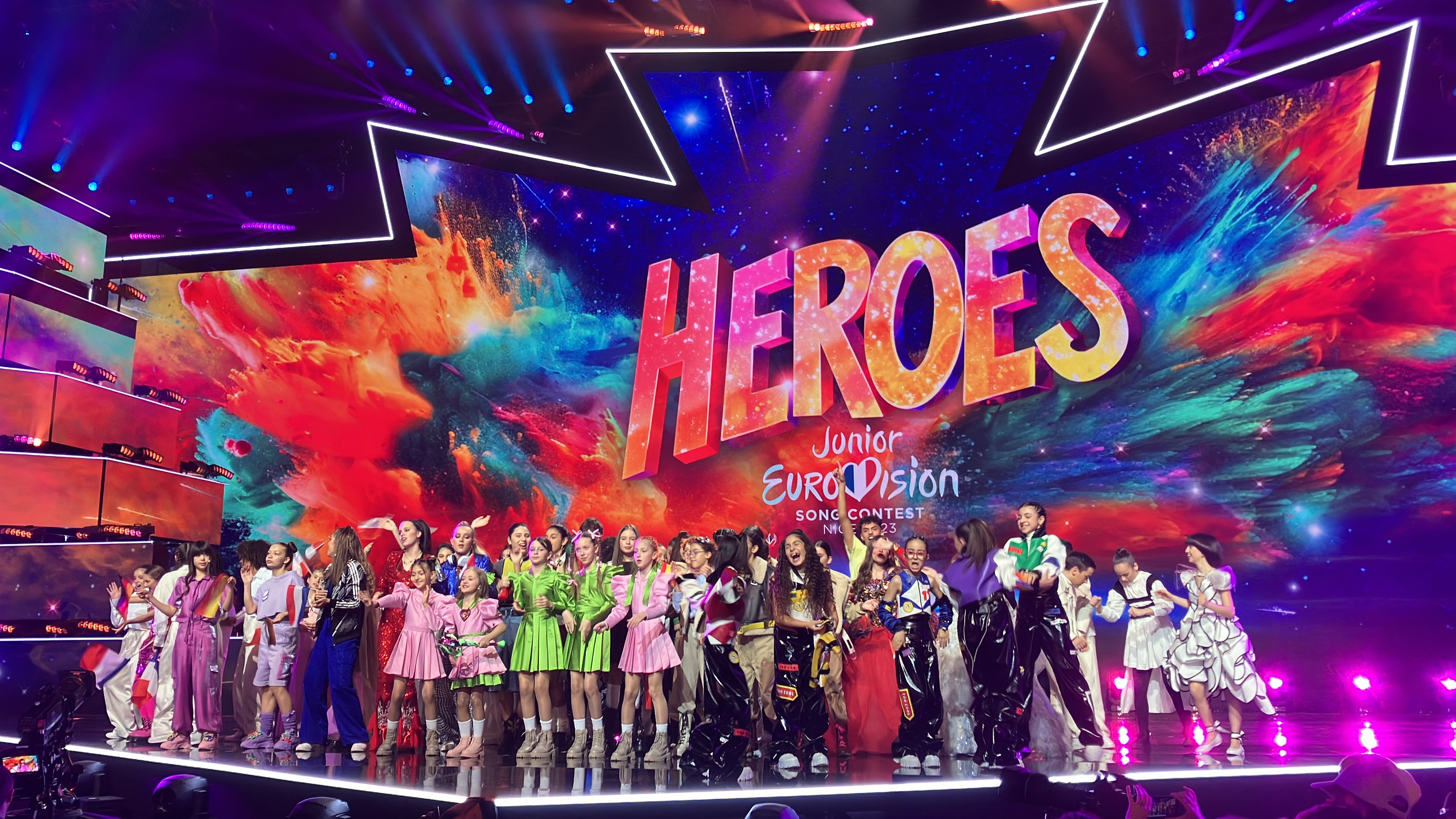
All the participating artists of the Junior Eurovision Song Contest 2023

On 29 August 2023, the EBU announced that 16 countries would participate in the contest, with Estonia making its debut and Germany returning after a one-year absence, while Kazakhstan and Serbia would not take part after doing so the previous years.

Sophie Lennon, who represented Ireland in 2022, joined Jessica McKean on stage.

Prior to the contest, a digital compilation album featuring all the songs from the 2023 contest was put together by the European Broadcasting Union and released by Universal Music on 3 November 2023.

Participants of the Junior Eurovision Song Contest 2023
Country	Broadcaster	Artist	Song	Language	Songwriter(s)
Albania	RTSH	Viola Gjyzeli	"Bota ime"	Albanian	Eriona Rushiti; Enis Mullaj
Armenia	AMPTV	Yan Girls	"Do It My Way"	Armenian, English	Arpine Martoyan; David Badalyan; Vahram Petrosyan
Estonia	ERR	Arhanna	"Hoiame kokku"	Estonian, English	Arhanna Sandra Arbma; Karl-Ander Reismann; Leelo Tungal; Rael Laikre
France	France Télévisions	Zoé Clauzure	"Cœur"	French	Noée Francheteau; Julien Comblat; Jérémy Chapron
Georgia	GPB	Anastasia and Ranina	"Over the Sky"	Georgian, English	Betkho; Mebo Nutsubidze
Germany	NDR/Kika	Fia	"Ohne Worte"	German (Note: German Sign Language was also used during the live televised performance.)	David Jürgens; Martin Fliegenschmidt; Sascha Seelemann
Ireland	TG4	Jessica McKean (Note: Features uncredited vocals by Sophie Lennon, who represented Ireland in 2022)	"Aisling"	Irish	Niall Mooney; Ken McHugh; Will Weeks; Niamh Mooney; Sophie Lennon
Italy	RAI	Melissa and Ranya	"Un mondo giusto"	Italian, English	Franco Fasano; Marco Iardella
Malta	PBS	Yulan	"Stronger"	English	John-Emil Johansson; Sandra Wikström; Isak Alvedahl; Elise Hedengren; Yulan
Netherlands	AVROTROS	Sep and Jasmijn	"Holding On to You"	Dutch, English	Robert Dorn
North Macedonia	MRT	Tamara Grujeska	"Kaži mi, kaži mi koj" (Кажи ми, кажи ми кој)	Macedonian, English	Robert Bilbilov; Kosta Petrov; Darko Dimitrov
Poland	TVP	Maja Krzyżewska	"I Just Need a Friend"	Polish, English	Patryk Kumór; Carla Fernandes; Marissa; Dominic Buczkowski-Wojtaszek; Piotr Zborowski
Portugal	RTP	Júlia Machado	"Where I Belong"	Portuguese, English	Aurora Pinto; Fernando Daniel; Luís "Twins" Pereira; João Direitinho; Júlia Machado (Note: Despite Machado's involvement in writing "Where I Belong", she was not credited.)
Spain	RTVE	Sandra Valero	"Loviu"	Spanish	Luis Vicente Ramiro; David Parejo; Alejandro Martínez; Diego José Cantero
Ukraine	UA:PBC	Anastasiia Dymyd	"Kvitka" (Квітка)	Ukrainian, English	Svitlana Tarabarova
United Kingdom	BBC	Stand Uniqu3	"Back to Life"	English	Sky Adams; Jakke Erixson; Jack Hawitt

== Production ==
A new child safety protocol focused on the well-being of the participants was implemented for the 2023 contest. According to the Spanish head of delegation Ana María Bordas, it sought to offer transparency in the competition, and to bring especially Nordic countries, who were critical of child safety in the contest, back to the event.

=== Visual, slogan and stage design ===
The new format of the contest's generic logo, incorporating the modern Eurovision heart design

The 2023 contest was the first edition of the Junior Eurovision Song Contest to incorporate the modern Eurovision heart, which has been used in the adult contest since 2015, in its generic logo. The update was revealed during the host city announcement on 3 April 2023.

During a European Broadcasting Union press conference on 10 May 2023 in Liverpool, where the Eurovision Song Contest 2023 was taking place, Alexandra Redde-Amiel, head of the French Eurovision delegation, announced the slogan of the contest, "Heroes". The accompanying theme art was unveiled on 29 August, which featured a street art look based on splashes of paint, chalk, powder and fireworks that "brings modernity and speaks to all generations". The stage design, unveiled on 27 September, featured a 12-metre high LED screen in the shape of wings, "reflecting the desire to fly away, create and imagine".

=== Presenters ===
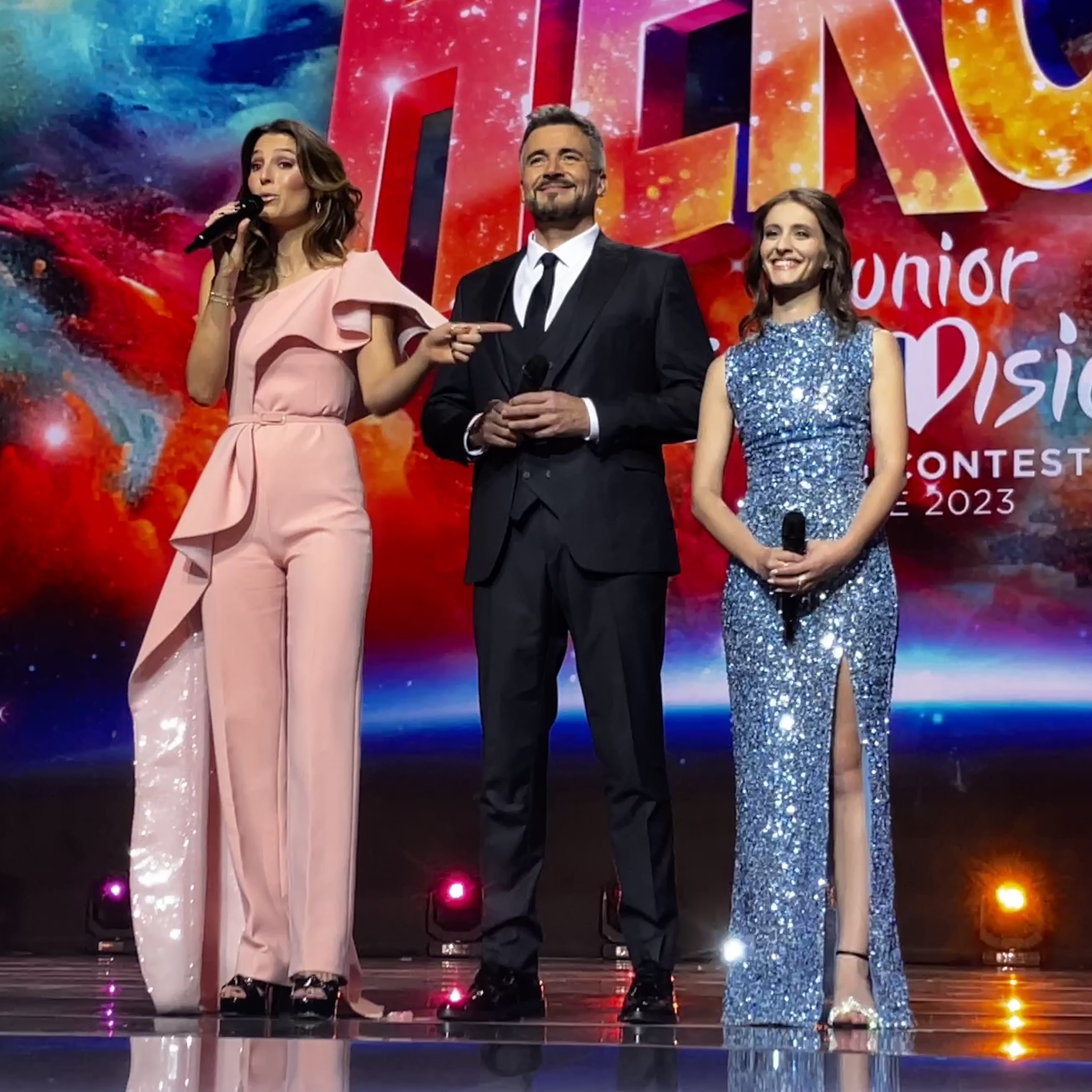
Presenters from left to right: Laury Thilleman, Olivier Minne and Ophenya

Laury Thilleman, Olivier Minne, and Ophenya were the presenters of the show; Minne had previously co-hosted the 2021 contest. Ophenya, a French influencer, additionally acted as a "digital ambassador", creating content for Junior Eurovision's social media channels.

The opening ceremony event, which was held on 20 November at Hotel Negresco, was hosted by Carla Lazzari, France's representative at the Junior Eurovision Song Contest 2019, and Manon Théodet. During the ceremony, each delegation was welcomed by Laura Tenoudji and Ophenya, and the draw was carried out, according to tradition. In this ceremony, the draw took place which determined the position of the host country (France) and which country will open and close the show. The ceremony also saw French Junior Eurovision representatives, since the country's return to the contest in 2018, perform excerpts of their entries.

=== Postcards ===
Contestants were featured in "postcard" video introductions, set in different locations in Nice. Each postcard began with a child participating in an activity of their choice and facing a setback that discourages them, before the upcoming performer, standing on top of a building, empowered them to accomplish their task. At the end of each postcard, the children participating in the aforementioned activity creatively recreated the flag of the upcoming performer's representative country, after which it transitioned to the stage.

- Albania – Musée Villa Masséna
- Armenia – Promenade de Paillon (Masséna's statue)
- Estonia – Opéra de Nice
- France – Rossetti Street, Old Town of Nice
- Georgia – Carrousel Garibaldi (Garibaldi square)
- Germany – Hotel Negresco
- Ireland – Place Masséna
- Italy – Théâtre National de Nice (St. Francis square)
- Malta – Quai Rauba Capeu (#IloveNice structure)
- Netherlands – Promenade des Anglais (Neptune beach)
- North Macedonia – Stade du Fort Carré (Antibes)
- Poland – Nice City Hall
- Portugal – Crémât Castle
- Spain – Nice Lawn Tennis Club
- Ukraine – Gare du Sud (Mediterraneo restaurant)
- United Kingdom – Old Port of Nice (quai des Deux Emmanuels)

== Contest overview ==
The event took place on 26 November 2023 at 16:00 CET. Sixteen countries participated, with the running order published on 20 November. All the countries competing were eligible to vote with the jury vote, as well as participating and non-participating countries under an aggregated international online vote. France won with 228 points, winning both the jury and online vote. Spain came second with 201 points, with Armenia, the United Kingdom and Ukraine completing the top five. North Macedonia, Portugal, Georgia, Estonia and Ireland occupied the bottom five positions.

The opening of the show featured the traditional flag parade, accompanied by a remix of "Makeba", with all participants performing the common song "Heroes" alongside Florence François and the Shiny Gospel Choir. During the interval, Lissandro performed his winning song "Oh Maman !". Amir then performed "J'ai cherché", with which he represented France in the Eurovision Song Contest 2016, and his new single "Il y a". Following a brief appearance by French pianist and TikTok personality Van Toan, former French Junior Eurovision entrants Angelina, Valentina, Enzo and Lissandro closed the interval with "We Are the World", in support of the Non-Violence Project.

During the event, there was a technical problem in which the LED screen abruptly shut off during Portugal's performance; Portugal's Júlia Machado was offered the chance to perform again, but the Portuguese delegation declined it because her vocal performance was not affected. The official upload of the Portuguese entry on YouTube used footage from the previous evening's jury show.

R/O	Country	Artist	Song	Points	Place
1	Spain	Sandra Valero	"Loviu"	201	2
2	Malta	Yulan	"Stronger"	94	10
3	Ukraine	Anastasiia Dymyd	"Kvitka"	128	5
4	Ireland	Jessica McKean	"Aisling"	42	16
5	United Kingdom	Stand Uniqu3	"Back to Life"	160	4
6	North Macedonia	Tamara Grujeska	"Kaži mi, kaži mi koj"	76	12
7	Estonia	Arhanna	"Hoiame kokku"	49	15
8	Armenia	Yan Girls	"Do It My Way"	180	3
9	Poland	Maja Krzyżewska	"I Just Need a Friend"	124	6
10	Georgia	Anastasia and Ranina	"Over the Sky"	74	14
11	Portugal	Júlia Machado	"Where I Belong"	75	13
12	France	Zoé Clauzure	"Cœur"	228	1
13	Albania	Viola Gjyzeli	"Bota ime"	115	8
14	Italy	Melissa and Ranya	"Un mondo giusto"	81	11
15	Germany	Fia	"Ohne Worte"	107	9
16	Netherlands	Sep and Jasmijn	"Holding On to You"	122	7

=== Spokespersons ===
The 12 points from the juries were announced live by a spokesperson from each country. Countries that did not provide their own spokesperson had their 12 points announced by a student from the International School of Nice. Known spokespersons are as follows:

- France – Enzo
- Georgia – Mariam Bigvava
- Ireland – Louisa McKean
- Malta – Gaia Gambuzza
- Netherlands – Luna
- Poland – Gabrysia Wojciechowicz
- Spain – Juan Diego Álvarez
- Ukraine – Zlata Dziunka

== Detailed voting results ==
Split results
Place	Combined		Jury		Online vote	
Place	Country	Points	Country	Points	Country	Points
1	France	228	France	136	France	92
2	Spain	201	Armenia	116	Spain	86
3	Armenia	180	Spain	115	Ukraine	83
4	United Kingdom	160	United Kingdom	102	Germany	74
5	Ukraine	128	Albania	70	Netherlands	70
6	Poland	124	Poland	69	Armenia	64
7	Netherlands	122	Netherlands	52	United Kingdom	58
8	Albania	115	Malta	51	Poland	55
9	Germany	107	Ukraine	45	Georgia	53
10	Malta	94	North Macedonia	37	Albania; Portugal	45
11	Italy	81	Italy	37	Albania; Portugal	45
12	North Macedonia	76	Germany	33	Italy	44
13	Portugal	75	Portugal	30	Estonia; Malta	43
14	Georgia	74	Georgia	21	Estonia; Malta	43
15	Estonia	49	Ireland	8	North Macedonia	39
16	Ireland	42	Estonia	6	Ireland	34

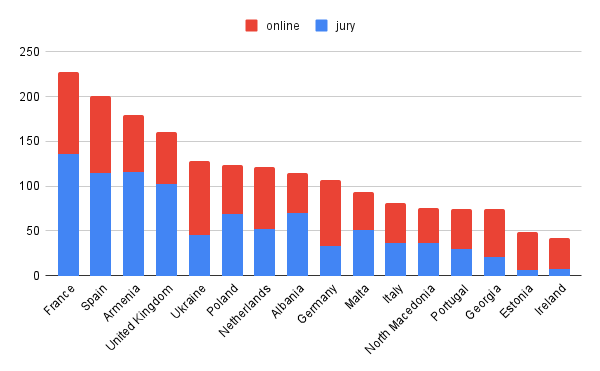
Distribution of points given by the juries and the audience

Detailed voting results of the final
Voting procedure used: 100% Online vote 100% Jury vote		Total score	Jury vote score	Online vote score	Jury vote															
Voting procedure used: 100% Online vote 100% Jury vote		Total score	Jury vote score	Online vote score	Spain	Malta	Ukraine	Ireland	United Kingdom	North Macedonia	Estonia	Armenia	Poland	Georgia	Portugal	France	Albania	Italy	Germany	Netherlands
Competing countries	Spain	201	115	86		6	5		8	10	12	6	2	12		12	10	12	10	10
Competing countries	Malta	94	51	43			3		4			12	3		7	10	4	6	2	
Competing countries	Ukraine	128	45	83	1			3	1	3	4		5	6			8	2	7	5
Competing countries	Ireland	42	8	34										3	4	1				
Competing countries	United Kingdom	160	102	58	10	10	12	4		7	6	8	8		1	4	12	8	5	7
Competing countries	North Macedonia	76	37	39	2	2	2	1				1	10		6	5	1		4	3
Competing countries	Estonia	49	6	43			1		2	2				1						
Competing countries	Armenia	180	116	64	3	12	10	2	12	12	8		7	10	2	7	6	5	12	8
Competing countries	Poland	124	69	55	8	4	7	10	10		2	5			8		3		6	6
Competing countries	Georgia	74	21	53	5				3			4			5			3	1	
Competing countries	Portugal	75	30	45	7	5		6			1		1	2		6				2
Competing countries	France	228	136	92	12	8	6	12	6	8	10	10	12	5	10		7	10	8	12
Competing countries	Albania	115	70	45			8	7	7	5	5	7	4	4	12	3		7		1
Competing countries	Italy	81	37	44	6	3		5		1	3			8	3	8				
Competing countries	Germany	107	33	74		1	4			4	7	3		7			2	1		4
Competing countries	Netherlands	122	52	70	4	7		8	5	6		2	6			2	5	4	3	

=== 12 points ===
Below is a summary of all 12 points received from each country's professional juries.

12 points awarded by juries
#	Recipient	Countries giving 12 points
4	Armenia	Germany, Malta, North Macedonia, United Kingdom
4	France	Ireland, Netherlands, Poland, Spain
4	Spain	Estonia, France, Georgia, Italy
2	United Kingdom	Albania, Ukraine
1	Albania	Portugal
1	Malta	Armenia

== Broadcasts ==
All participating broadcasters may choose to have on-site or remote commentators providing insight and voting information to their local audience. The European Broadcasting Union also provided international live streams of the contest through their official YouTube channel with no commentary.

Broadcasters and commentators in participating countries
Country	Broadcaster	Channel(s)	Commentator(s)	Ref.
Albania	RTSH	RTSH 1, RTSH Muzikë, Radio Tirana	Andri Xhahu	
Armenia	AMPTV	1TV	Hamlet Arakelyan and Hrachuhi Utmazyan	
Estonia	ERR	ETV2	Marko Reikop	
Estonia	ERR	ETV+	Aleksandr Hobotov and Julia Kalenda [russian]	
France	France Télévisions	France 2	Stéphane Bern and Carla Lazzari	
Georgia	GPB	1TV	Nikoloz Lobiladze	
Germany	ARD/ZDF	Kika	Consi	
Ireland	TG4		Sinéad Ní Uallacháin	
Italy	RAI	Rai 1	Mario Acampa	
Malta	PBS	TVM	No commentator	
Netherlands	NPO/AVROTROS	NPO Zapp via NPO 3	Bart Arens and Matheu Hinzen	
North Macedonia	MRT	MRT 1	Eli Tanaskovska	
Poland	TVP	TVP1, TVP Polonia, TVP ABC	Aleksander Sikora	
Portugal	RTP	RTP1, RTP Internacional, RTP África	Nuno Galopim and Iolanda Ferreira	
Spain	RTVE	La 1, TVE Internacional, TVE 4K	Julia Varela and Tony Aguilar	
Ukraine	UA:PBC	Suspilne Kultura	Timur Miroshnychenko	
United Kingdom	BBC	BBC Two, CBBC	Lauren Layfield and Hrvy	

Broadcasters and commentators in non-participating countries
Country	Broadcaster	Channel(s)	Commentator(s)	Ref.
Kazakhstan	Khabar Agency	Khabar TV	Yerdana Yerzhanuly and Dinara Sadu	
Lithuania	LRT	LRT televizija	Ramūnas Zilnys	

== Incidents and controversies ==
=== Investigation into event financing ===
In June 2025, Agence France-Presse reported a development in a judicial investigation concerning the organisation and financing of two events held in Nice in 2023, including the Junior Eurovision Song Contest. As part of the investigation, the mayor of Nice, Christian Estrosi, his wife, journalist Laura Tenoudji, and the chief executive officer of France Télévisions and president of the EBU, Delphine Ernotte, were taken into temporary custody. Local media had previously raised concerns about the decision to appoint Tenoudji as a co-host of the contest's opening ceremony, criticising her performance and citing perceived language errors and lack of professionalism. Authorities opened an inquiry to determine whether public funds allocated for the events may have involved a conflict of interest. Estrosi and Ernotte were later released without charges, with a lawyer representing Estrosi stating that the allegations may have been politically motivated and aimed at damaging his reputation.

== See also ==
- Eurovision Song Contest 2023
