= Lissandro =

French child singer (born 2009)

Lissandro Formica
- Also known as: Lissandro
- Born: 2 October 2009 (age 16); Moselle, France
- Genres: Chanson; French pop
- Occupation: Singer
- Instrument: Vocals
- Years active: 2020–present
- Labels: MCA / Universal Music

Lissandro Formica (born 2 October 2009), known mononymously as Lissandro, is a French singer best known for winning the Junior Eurovision Song Contest 2022 with the song "Oh Maman !". Previously, in 2020, he reached the final of the seventh season of the French version of The Voice Kids.

== Career ==
Lissandro showed an early interest in music after his father introduced him to the work of Elvis Presley, resulting in the nickname Elvissandro. He was discovered by singer Marina D'Amico, and his parents enrolled him in D'Amico's singing school.

He participated in the seventh season of The Voice Kids, where he reached the finals. In the blind auditions, he sang "Too Much" by Elvis Presley, and all four judges turned their seats for him.

He is also a voice actor and has done French dubbing for several series.

The Voice Kids performances
Stage	Song
Blind audition	"Too Much" – Elvis Presley
Semi-final	"One Way or Another" – Blondie
Final	"Blame It on the Boogie" – Jackson Five

=== Junior Eurovision Song Contest ===
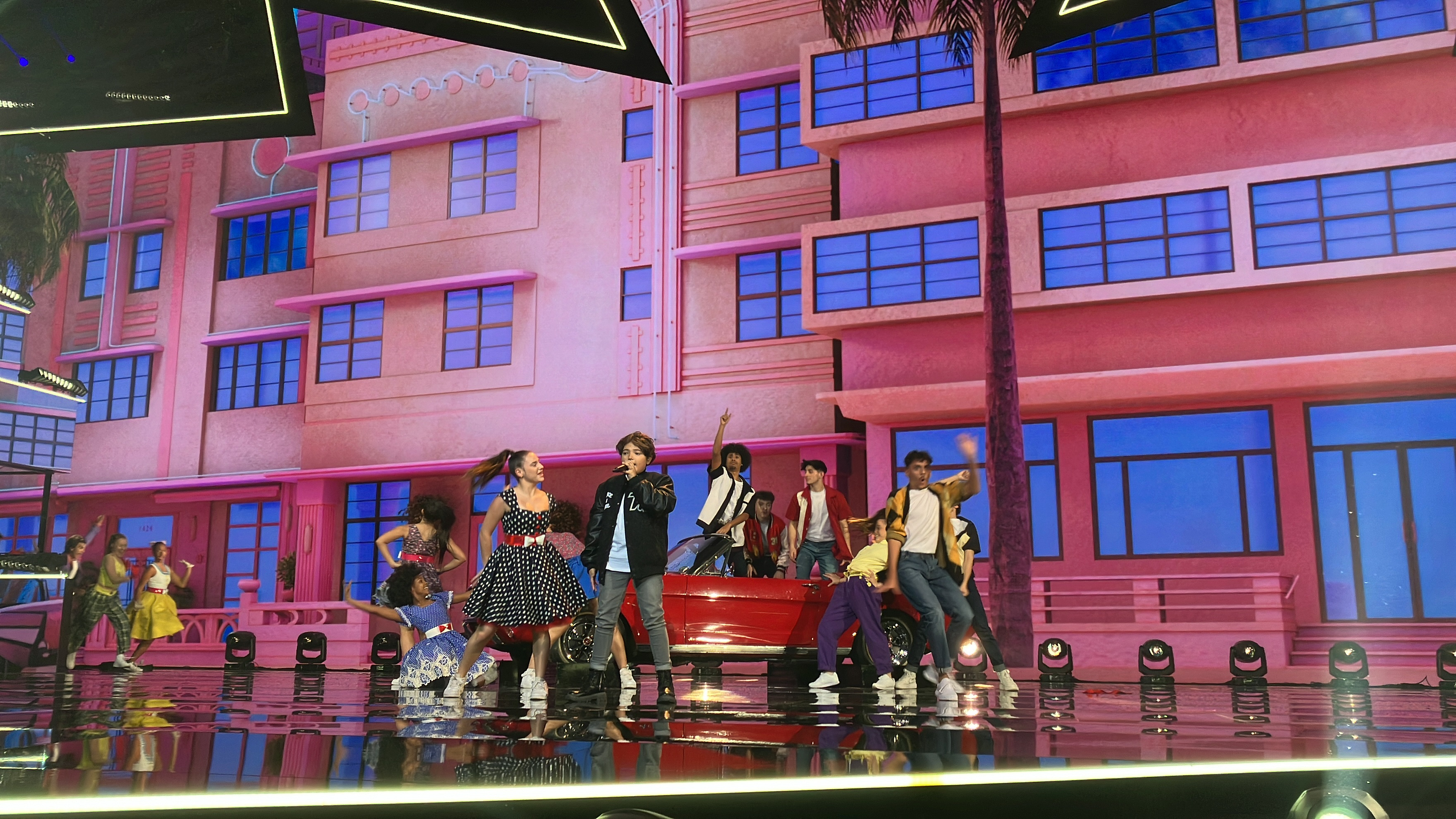
Lissandro performing at the Junior Eurovision Song Contest 2023

On 28 October 2022, France Télévisions announced Lissandro would represent France at the Junior Eurovision Song Contest 2022 that would held in Yerevan, Armenia with a song titled "Oh Maman !". On the same day, the track was released as a single. The song's style was anticipated to be "a mix between Bruno Mars and Elvis" and has been described as rockabilly and pop rock. It was written by Frédéric Château and Barbara Pravi (who had composed the French Junior Eurovision entries in 2019 and 2020, and represented France in the Eurovision Song Contest 2021). On 6 November, a music video for the song was released online. For his performance, Lissandro was joined on stage by four backing dancers: Lola, Yana, Mahdy and Thimeo.

Lissandro won the Junior Eurovision, scoring 203 points and finishing 23 points ahead of the runner-up. This was France's second victory in the contest, after Valentina's win in 2020 with her song "J'imagine".

In November 2024, he was selected as the spokesperson to announce the French jury results in the Junior Eurovision Song Contest 2024 that would be held in Madrid, Spain.

Awards and achievements
Preceded by Maléna "Qami Qami"	Winner of the Junior Eurovision Song Contest; 2022	Succeeded by Zoé Clauzure with "Cœur"
Preceded by Enzo with "Tic Tac"	France in the Junior Eurovision Song Contest; 2023	Succeeded by Zoé Clauzure with "Cœur"
