= Hôtel de Ville, Nice =

Town hall in Nice, France

Hôtel de Ville
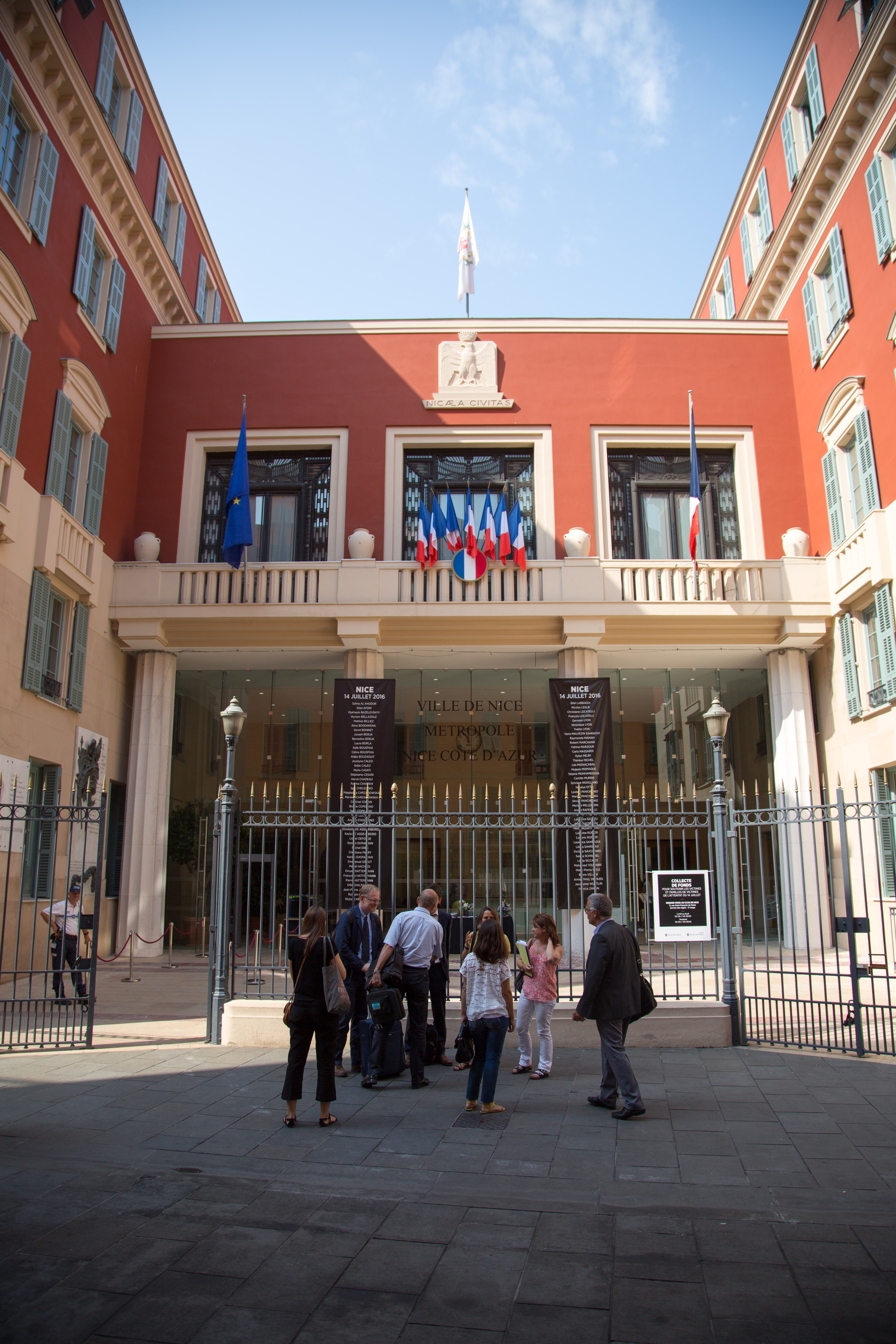
- Courtyard entrance of the Hôtel de Ville in September 2016
- Interactive map of the Hôtel de Ville area

General information
- Type: City hall
- Architectural style: Art Deco style
- Location: Nice, France
- Coordinates: 43.6961°N 7.2715°E
- Completed: 1722

Design and construction
- Architect: Nicolas Anselmi

The Hôtel de Ville (French pronunciation: [otɛl də vil], City Hall) is a historic building in Nice, Alpes-Maritimes, southern France, standing on Rue Saint-François de Paule.

== History ==
The building was commissioned as part of a masterplan instigated by Louis XIV, in 1706, to reclaim the Pré-aux-Oies area of Nice which had previously been marshland. After sanitation had been installed, Rue Saint-François de Paule was the first street to be laid out. Located on the north side of the street, the building was originally conceived as a seminary. It was designed in the neoclassical style, built in ashlar stone and the first phase was completed in 1722. The design involved a symmetrical main frontage of seven bays facing onto Rue Saint-François de Paule. The original design of the five-storey building was austere: it was fenestrated with tall casement windows with shutters on all floors. There were iron grills on the windows on the ground floor, and segmental pediments above the windows on the second floor.

In 1792, Victor Amadeus III of Sardinia declared war on Revolutionary France, and his officers requisitioned the building for use as military barracks. After the city was conquered by troops of the French First Republic later that year, the barracks were occupied by French republican troops. The building remained in military use until 1804, when it became a gendarmerie. Following the fall of Napoleon in 1815, it was acquired by Saint-Roch Hospital for medical use. The new Saint-Roch Hospital on Rue Pierre Dévoluy was completed in 1858, and the building on Rue Saint-François de Paule then reverted to being a gendarmerie.

The building was acquired by Nice City Council in 1866, and was converted for municipal use to a design by the city architect, François Aune. Council officers relocated from their old accommodation at the Palais communal de Nice in Place Saint-François into their new home on Rue Saint-François de Paule in 1868.

Following the election of Jean Médecin as mayor of Nice in 1928, the council decided to remodel the building in the Art Deco style. A major programme of external works was carried out to a design by Nicolas Anselmi, and the interior was redecorated to a design by Clément Goyenèche. The external works included the installation of a two-storey portico, formed by six two storey Doric order columns supporting a balcony, on the Rue Saint-François de Paule, as well as the creation of a new courtyard entrance on Rue de Hôtel de Ville i.e. the east side of the building. A sculpture depicting a 6 feet (1.8 m) high thumb, designed by César Baldaccini, was installed in the new courtyard in 1965.

Further internal modifications were made in 1967 to a design by Émile Rous. A plaque, intended to commemorate the lives of 17 resistance fighters from the 1st Canton who died in the Second World War was installed in the courtyard and restored in the early 21st century. Individual plaques commemorating the lives of the resistance fighters, Jean Marius-Gordolon and Joseph Giuge, both of whom died close to the building, were fixed to the main façade of the building.
