= France in the Junior Eurovision Song Contest =

- Junior Eurovision Song Contest
- Participating broadcaster: France Télévisions

Participation summary
- Appearances: 10
- First appearance: 2004
- Highest placement: 1st: 2020, 2022, 2023, 2025
- Host: 2021, 2023
- Participation history: 2004; 2005 – 2017; 2018; 2019; 2020; 2021; 2022; 2023; 2024; 2025; 2026

External links
- France 2 page

France has been represented at the Junior Eurovision Song Contest ten times since its debut in 2004. The French participating broadcaster in the contest is France Télévisions. Following its debut, the broadcaster took a fourteen-year hiatus before returning in 2018. It has won the contest on four occasions: in 2020 with "J'imagine" by Valentina, in 2022 with "Oh Maman !" by Lissandro, in 2023 with "Cœur" by Zoé Clauzure and in 2025 with "Ce monde" by Lou Deleuze; France is one of two countries (alongside Poland) to have won two consecutive contests.

== Contest history ==
France has been represented at the Junior Eurovision Song Contest eight times since their debut at the Junior Eurovision Song Contest 2004. Their first entry in the contest was the song "Si on voulait bien" performed by Thomas Pontier. To select the entry, a national final was held at France Televisions studios in Paris. 7,000 children auditioned for the event, and an extra 1,000 were invited to the final. By the end, 11 candidates became the finalists, with Pontier winning the competition with his cover of Téléphone's song "Un autre monde". His song for Junior Eurovision, "Si on voulait bien", was later released on 7 October along with a music video. Despite placing sixth out of the 18 participants, France Télévisions opted to not participate after 2004, saying there was no motivation to compete and that "too much Eurovision kills Eurovision".

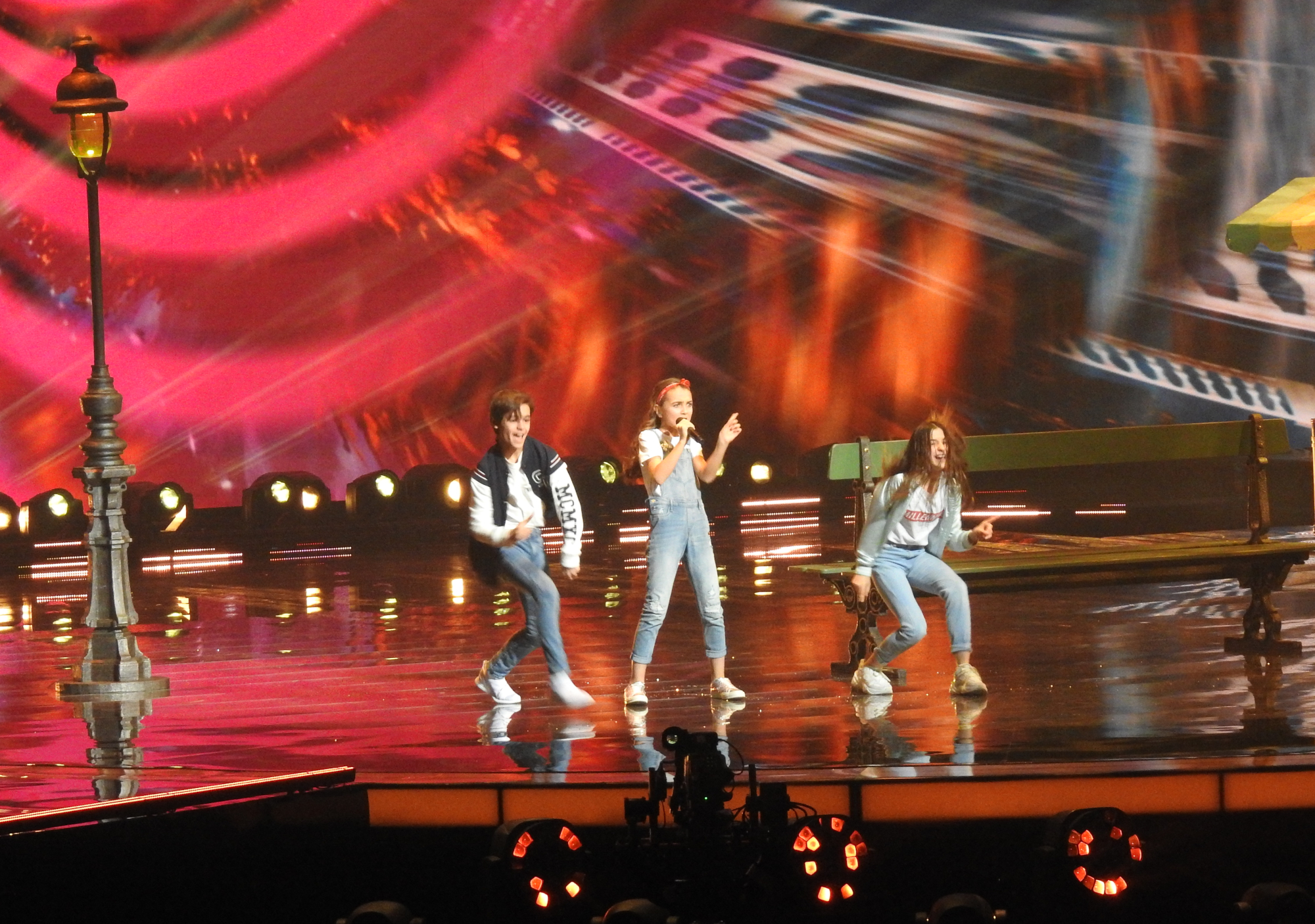
Angélina in Minsk (2018)

On 18 November 2015, it was revealed that the French broadcaster was interested in returning to the contest. However, France 2 announced on 24 June 2015 that they had no plans to return to the contest, though the broadcaster sent a delegation to Bulgaria in order to observe the 2015 edition. On 13 May 2016, executive supervisor Jon Ola Sand announced at a press conference, that the EBU were in contact with broadcasters from several countries including France, so that they would participate in the 2016 contest. Edoardo Grassi, the Head of Delegation for France in the Eurovision Song Contest was one of the jury members at the Maltese national selection for the 2016 Junior Eurovision, and was introduced by the hosts of the show as being the Head of Delegation for France in the Junior Eurovision Song Contest. The return however did not materialise. On 12 May 2018, it was announced that France would return to the contest in 2018, with the nation represented by Angélina, winner of the fourth season of The Voice Kids, who was internally selected as the entrant. Her song "Jamais sans toi" was drawn to perform fifteenth on 25 November 2018, following Israel and preceding Macedonia, eventually placing second at the contest with 203 points. For the 2019 contest, France was represented by Carla with the song "Bim bam toi". During the opening ceremony and the running order draw which both took place on 18 November 2019, France was drawn to perform second on 24 November 2019, following Australia and preceding Russia. At the conclusion of the event, the entry placed fifth with 169 points. Despite achieving France's second-worst result in the contest as of 2025, the song garnered considerable attention after becoming viral on TikTok, with its music video becoming the most-watched upload on the contest's official YouTube channel.

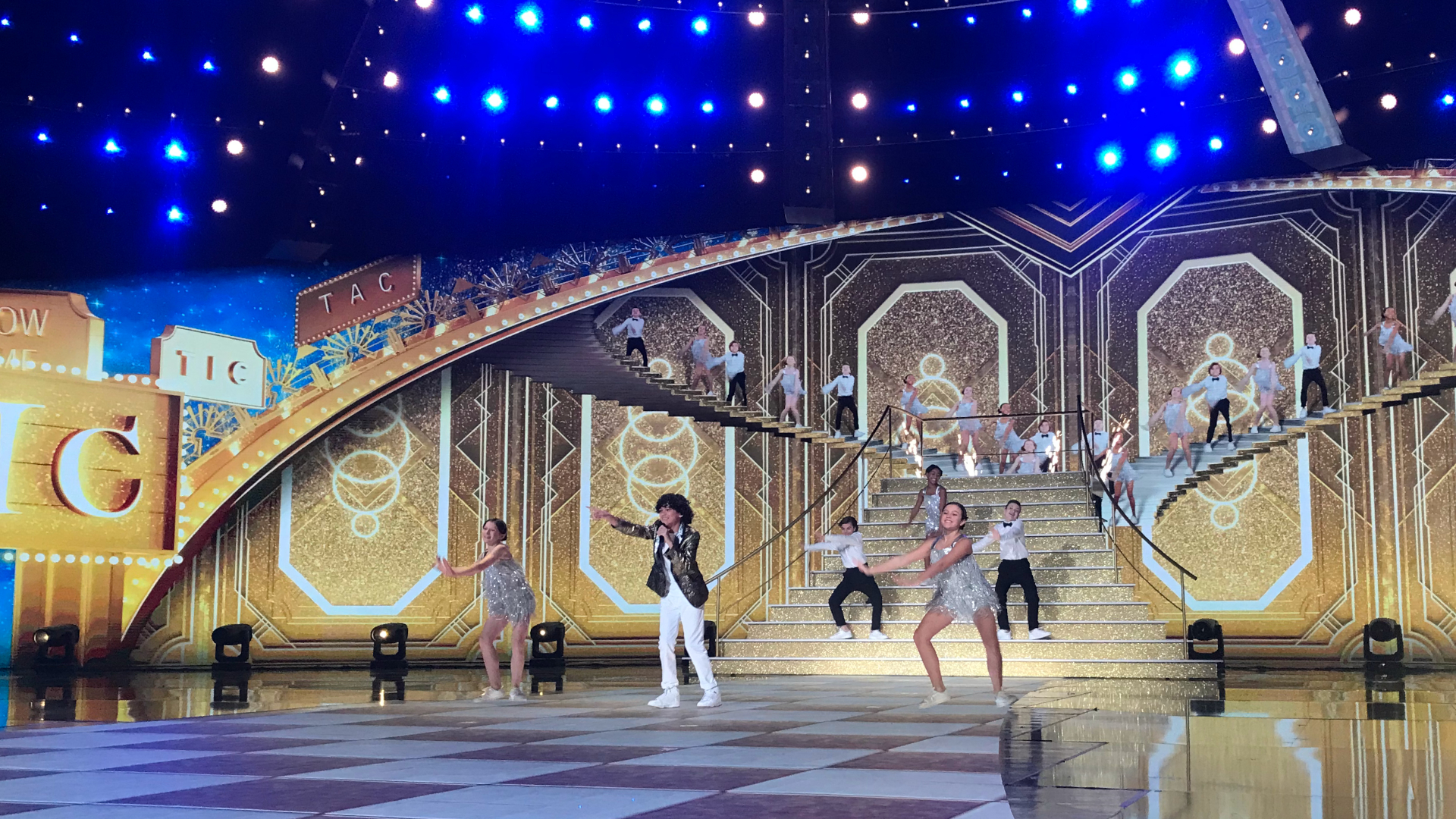
Enzo in Paris (2021)

On 8 October 2020, France 2 selected at the time 11-year old Valentina to represent the country at the 2020 contest in Warsaw, Poland, with her song later announced to be called "J'imagine". On 29 November 2020, Valentina became the first French entrant to win the contest, giving France their first victory as well as their first win in any Eurovision event since Eurovision Young Dancers 1989. On 9 December 2020, it was confirmed by the EBU that France would host the 2021 contest. France opted for an internal selection for the Junior Eurovision Song Contest 2021 and was represented by French hip-hop and R&B singer Enzo. His selected song was "Tic Tac", which was released at midnight on 22 October. It was written and composed by Alban Lico, and was described as "an invitation to take a break to enjoy simple things far from our hectic and hyperconnected lives", according to France 2. During the running order draw, which took place on 13 December 2021, host country France was drawn to perform thirteenth, following Ukraine and preceding Azerbaijan. France ended up placing third at the conclusion of the event.

On 28 October 2022, Lissandro was announced as the French entrant at the Junior Eurovision Song Contest 2022 with the song "Oh Maman !". After the opening ceremony for the 2022 contest, which took place on 5 December 2022, it was announced that France would perform sixth on 11 December 2022, following Italy and preceding Albania. The entry won the contest with 203 points, marking the second time France won the Contest. French head of delegation Alexandra Redde-Amiel and Director General of France Télévisions Delphine Ernotte then revealed that the country would host the next edition of the contest in 2023.

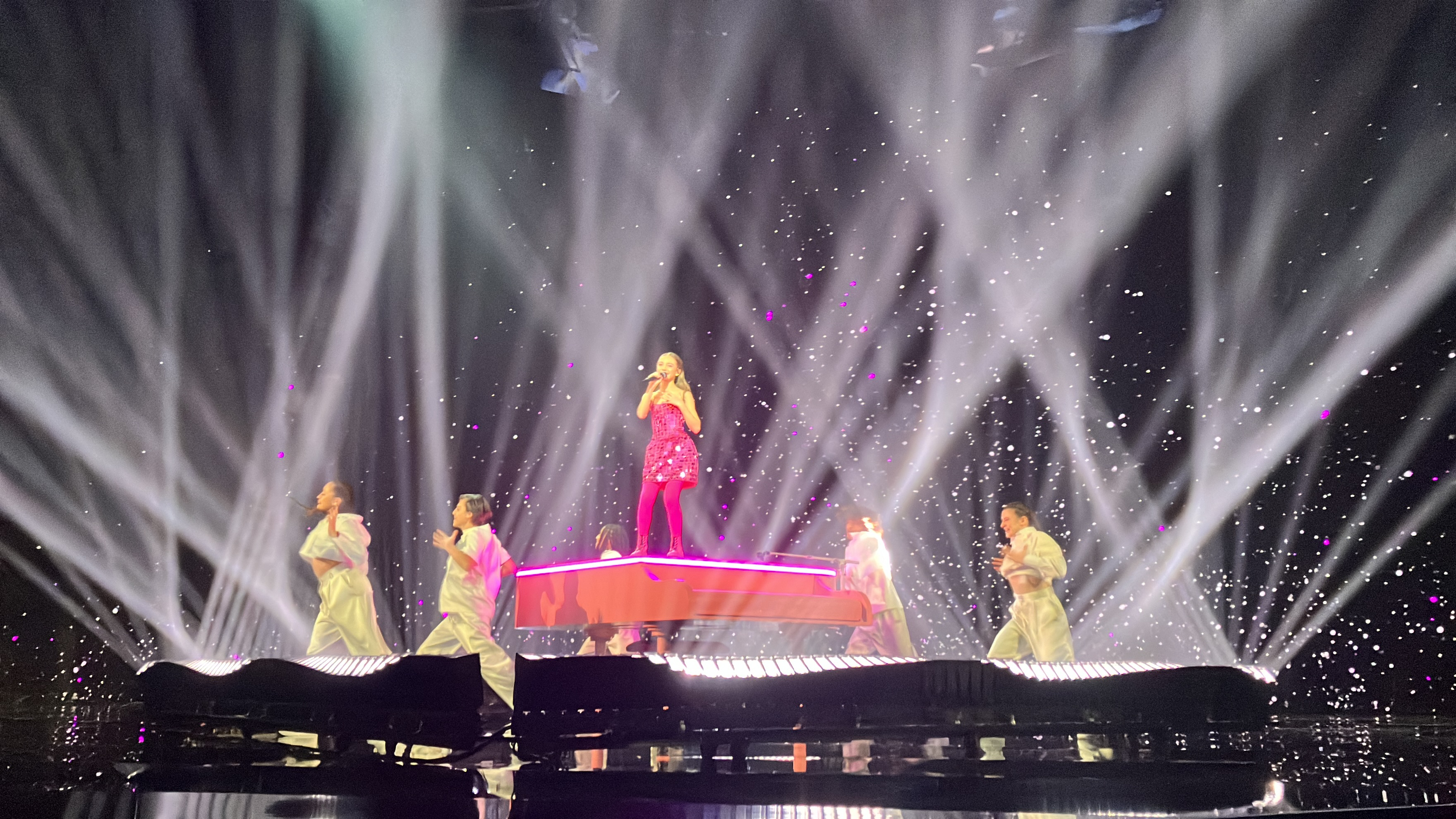
Zoé Clauzure in Nice (2023)

France Télévisions selected Zoé Clauzure as the host entry for the Junior Eurovision Song Contest 2023, held in Nice. Her song "Cœur", written by Noée Francheteau, Julien Comblat and Jérémy Chapron, was revealed soon after the announcement of the chosen artist during a press conference held on 27 September 2023. During the opening ceremony and the running order draw, which both took place on 20 November 2023, host country France was drawn to perform twelfth, following Portugal and preceding Albania. The entry won the contest having gained 228 points, winning the jury vote and online vote, this marked the third French victory in the competition, making it the country with the record number of wins, tied with Georgia. France also became the second country to win the Junior Eurovision Song Contest twice in a row, after Poland did so in 2018 and 2019. Despite Clauzure's win on home soil, France Télévisions ultimately opted against hosting the contest for the third time a four-year span in 2024, with Spain eventually announced as the host country. In August 2024, Redde-Amiel revealed in an Instagram story that work was underway on the French entry for the 2024 contest. On 18 September 2024, Titouan was announced as the French entrant with the song "Comme ci, comme ça", written by Malory Legardinier and Marie Bastide, which premiered later that day. Titouan was selected at a closed audition with around 20 participants and himself selected "Comme ci, comme ça" from among three potential songs. At the conclusion of the contest, France received 177 points, placing fourth out of 17 participating countries.

On 15 July 2025, France Télévisions confirmed its intention to participate in the 2025 contest, with Lou Deleuze announced on 29 September as the French entrant with the song "Ce monde", written by John Claes, Jonathan Thyssens and Pauline Thisse. France won the contest having scored 248 points, marking the country's fourth win and again tying it with Georgia (who had since also won in 2024) for the record number of victories. On 18 December 2025, France Télévisions announced it had declined to host the 2026 contest, citing plans to reduce spending. Redde-Amiel confirmed the broadcaster's intention to compete on 14 May 2026, with Alec announced as the selected artist the following 20 June, during the Fête de la Musique concert on France 2. His song "Comment tu vas?", written by himself and Malory Legardinier, was released on 24 September. France placed third in the final, scoring 165 points; 51 points from the online vote and 114 points from the juries.

== Participation overview ==
Table key
1	First place
2	Second place
3	Third place

Year	Artist	Song	Language	Place	Points
2004	Thomas Pontier	"Si on voulait bien"	French	6	78
2018	Angélina	"Jamais sans toi"	French, English	2	203
2019	Carla	"Bim bam toi"	French	5	169
2020	Valentina	"J'imagine"	French	1	200
2021	Enzo	"Tic Tac"	French	3	187
2022	Lissandro	"Oh Maman!"	French	1	203
2023	Zoé Clauzure	"Cœur"	French	1	228
2024	Titouan	"Comme ci, comme ça"	French	4	177
2025	Lou Deleuze	"Ce monde"	French	1	248
2026	Alec	"Comment tu vas?"	French	3	165

== Commentators and spokespersons ==
The contests are broadcast online worldwide through the official Junior Eurovision Song Contest website junioreurovision.tv and YouTube. In 2015, the online broadcasts featured commentary in English by junioreurovision.tv editor Luke Fisher and 2011 Bulgarian Junior Eurovision Song Contest entrant Ivan Ivanov. The French broadcaster, France Télévisions, sent their own commentators to the contest in order to provide commentary in the French language. Spokespersons were also chosen by the national broadcaster in order to announce the awarding points from France. The table below list the details of each commentator and spokesperson since 2004.

Year	Channel	Commentator	Spokesperson	Ref.
2004	France 3	Elsa Fayer and Bruno Berberes	Gabrielle	
2018	France 2	Stéphane Bern and Madame Monsieur	Lubava Marchuk and Daniil Rotenko	
2019	France 2	Stéphane Bern and Sandy Héribert	Karolina	
2020	France 2	Stéphane Bern and Carla Lazzari	Nathan Laface	
2021	France 2	Stéphane Bern and Laurence Boccolini	Angélina	
2022	France 2	Stéphane Bern and Carla Lazzari	Valentina	
2023	France 2	Stéphane Bern and Carla Lazzari	Enzo	
2024	France 2	Stéphane Bern and Valentina	Lissandro	
2025	France 4	Stéphane Bern and Zoé Clauzure	Titouan	
2026	France 4	Stéphane Bern	Zoé Clauzure	

== Hostings ==
Year	Location	Venue	Presenters	Ref.
2021	Paris	La Seine Musicale	Carla, Élodie Gossuin and Olivier Minne	
2023	Nice	Palais Nikaïa	Laury Thilleman, Olivier Minne and Ophenya	

== See also ==
- France in the Eurovision Song Contest
