= Cœur (song) =

2023 single by Zoé Clauzure

Single by Zoé Clauzure
- Released: 27 September 2023
- Length: 3:02
- Label: Parlophone; Warner Music France
- Composers: Julien Comblat; Jérémy Chapron
- Lyricist: Noée Francheteau

Music video
- "Cœur" on YouTube

Junior Eurovision Song Contest 2023 entry
- Country: France
- Artist: Zoé Clauzure
- Language: French

Finals performance
- Final result: 1st
- Final points: 228

Entry chronology
- ◄ "Oh Maman !" (2022)
- "Comme ci, comme ça" (2024) ►

"Cœur" (French pronunciation: [kœʁ], lit. 'Heart') is a song by French singer Zoé Clauzure, released as a single on 27 September 2023.

It was France's winning entry in the Junior Eurovision Song Contest 2023. Zoé Clauzure, aged 13 at the time, won the competition with a total of 228 points, 27 points ahead of second-placed Spain, earning France its second consecutive and third overall victory at the contest.

== Description ==
The song is about school bullying. It was written by Noée Francheteau and composed by Julien Comblat and Jérémy Chapron.

Zoé had previously dealt with the topic in her song "Ma place" (lit. "My Place"), but this new track was more on the "sunny side", delivering a strong positive, supportive message. While not making any direct references to school bullying, the singer encourages the listeners to "move forward towards victory" despite some people wanting to see the listener fail. In the chorus, she communicates the sentiment of togetherness with her listeners and highlights the excitement of performing for them on stage and making their existence known to the world: "My heart beats in rhythm, it beats so fast when I sing for you. When I sing, I want the whole world to see us exist."

According to the singer, she received messages from people saying that her song saved their lives.

== Junior Eurovision ==
=== Selection ===
On 27 September 2023, France Télévisions announced Zoé had been internally selected to represent France at the 2023 Junior Eurovision Song Contest with her song "Cœur". On the same day, the song was released as a single.

=== Music video ===
The music video was released online on 18 October 2023 at 18:00 CET. It was directed by Alexandre Saltiel and choreographed by Cain and Céline Kitsaïs (founders of a dance school named Neodance Academy) and Sabrina Lonis.

It has an emphasis on the colors red and white.

=== Victory ===
The contest took place on November 26 at the Nikaïa Concert Hall in Nice, France. Zoé's stage performance had her surrounded by backing dancers in a "Barbie pink" ambiance.

Zoé Clauzure won the competition, scoring 228 points, ahead of Spain with 201 and Armenia with 180 points. This was France's second consecutive and third overall victory in the contest.
