= Oh Maman! =

2022 single by Lissandro

"Oh Maman !"

Single by Lissandro
- Released: 28 October 2022
- Genre: Children's music
- Length: 2:52
- Label: MCA / Universal Music
- Composer: Frédéric Chateau
- Lyricists: Frédéric Chateau, Barbara Pravi

Music video
- "Oh Maman !" on YouTube

Junior Eurovision Song Contest 2022 entry
- Country: France
- Artist: Lissandro
- Language: French

Finals performance
- Final result: 1st
- Final points: 203

Entry chronology
- ◄ "Tic Tac" (2021)
- "Cœur" (2023) ►

"Oh Maman!" (lit. '"Oh, Mammy!"') is a song by French singer Lissandro, released as a single on 28 October 2022.

It was France's winning entry in the Junior Eurovision Song Contest 2022. Lissandro, aged 13 at the time, won the competition with a total of 203 points, 23 points ahead of second-placed Armenia, earning France its second overall victory at the contest.

== Composition ==
The song was composed by Frédéric Chateau, who also wrote the lyrics alongside Barbara Pravi, who represented France in the Eurovision Song Contest 2021 with the song "Voilà".

== Junior Eurovision Song Contest ==
=== Selection, announcement and release ===
On 28 October 2022, France Télévisions announced having selected Lissandro with a song titled "Oh Maman!" to represent France at the Junior Eurovision Song Contest that would be held in Yerevan, Armenia, on 11 December. On the same day, the song was released as a single. The accompanying music video was unveiled on November 6.

=== Victory ===
On 11 December, Lissandro won the Junior Eurovision with a total of 203 points, 23 points ahead of second-placed Armenia and 42 points ahead of third-placed Georgia. This was France's second overall victory at the contest, after that of Valentina in 2020 with her song "J'imagine".

== Track listing ==
Digital download
No.	Title	Length
1.	"Oh Maman!"	2:52
