= Spain in the Junior Eurovision Song Contest 2023 =

- Junior Eurovision Song Contest 2023
- Participating broadcaster: Radiotelevisión Española (RTVE)
- Country: Spain
- Selection process: Internal selection
- Announcement date: Artist: 7 July 2023; Song: 3 October 2023

Competing entry
- Song: "Loviu"
- Artist: Sandra Valero
- Songwriters: Luis Ramiro; David Parejo Martín; Alejandro Martínez Valderrama; Diego Cantero

Placement
- Final result: 2nd, 201 points

Participation chronology

Spain was represented at the Junior Eurovision Song Contest 2023 with the song "Loviu", written by Luis Ramiro, David Parejo Martín, Alejandro Martínez Valderrama, and Diego Cantero, and performed by Sandra Valero. The Spanish participating broadcaster, Radiotelevisión Española (RTVE), internally selected its entry for the contest.

The singer performed first in the running order, preceding the entry from Malta. Spain finished in second position with 201 points, marking the seventh time the country finished in the top five at the Junior Eurovision Song Contest and its best result since the 2005 contest.

== Background ==
Prior to the 2023 contest, Televisión Española (TVE) until 2006, and Radiotelevisión Española (RTVE) since 2019, had participated in the Junior Eurovision Song Contest representing Spain on eight occasions since TVE's debut in the inaugural 2003 contest. They won the 2004 contest with the song "Antes muerta que sencilla", performed by María Isabel. TVE decided to take an indefinite break from the contest after the 2006 contest, with a broadcaster representative stating "Junior Eurovision promotes stereotypes [they] do not share". RTVE returned after a 13-year absence in 2019. Their return proved successful, with "Marte" by Melani García in 2019 and "Palante" by Soleá in 2020 both reaching third place. In 2022, "Señorita" performed by Carlos Higes achieved 6th place out of 16 countries with 137 points.

== Before Junior Eurovision ==
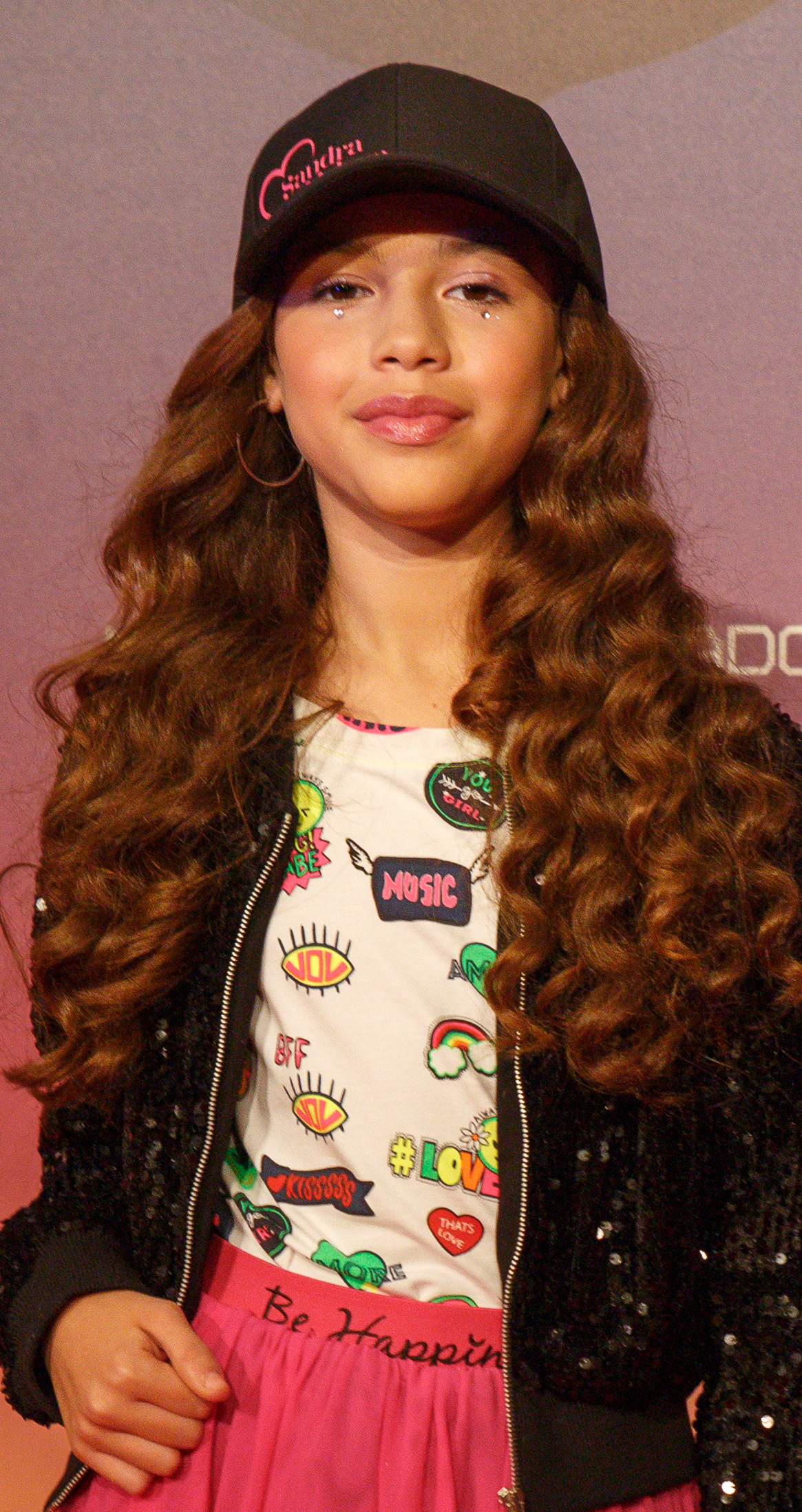
RTVE internally selected Sandra Valero to represent Spain in Junior Eurovision.

On 7 July 2023, RTVE announced that Sandra Valero had been selected as its representative based on the unanimous decision of a jury panel made up of Ana María Bordas (head of the Spanish delegation for the contest and co-director of Benidorm Fest), María Eizaguirre (director of communication and participation at RTVE), Miriam Corrales (director of RTVE Entertainment), César Vallejo (co-director of Benidorm Fest), Rayden (musical advisor, Benidorm Fest 2022 contestant), Tony Sánchez-Ohlsson (musical advisor, songwriter of the Spanish entries for the Eurovision Song Contest in 2007, 2012, and 2015), and Pablo Rodríguez (musical advisor).

RTVE received a total of 114 applications (19 more than in 2022), of which 14 progressed to the live auditions. Valero presented a rendition of "Parte de tu mundo", the Spanish-language version of "Part of Your World" from The Little Mermaid (1989) soundtrack during her winning audition the day prior to the announcement, held at Prado del Rey in Pozuelo de Alarcón. She had previously competed in season 7 of La Voz Kids.

On 15 September 2023, during the presentation gala of the 2023–24 season of RTVE, it was revealed that Valero would sing "Loviu" in Junior Eurovision, and a week later a press conference dedicated to the presentation of some details about the entry was organised. The song was selected following an open call for entries, after the closing of which 60 songs were assessed and three were shortlisted, including the selected entry as well as "Superwoman" and "La música". However, the former entry was soon later discarded due to "impossibility of adjusting Sandra Valero's vocal range to that of the song", after which "Loviu", composed by Luis Ramiro, David Parejo Martín, Alejandro Martínez Valderrama, and Diego Cantero, was selected with a majority of the votes from the committee.

"Loviu" was released on 3 October. The song contains repeated phrases in English, French, Italian, and Portuguese. A music video directed by Jimmy Llamas and recorded in a virtual reality studio in Boadilla del Monte was later teased by RTVE during a press conference on release day, which would go on to be released on 11 October.

== At Junior Eurovision ==
The Junior Eurovision Song Contest 2023 took place at Palais Nikaïa in Nice, France on 26 November 2023. The event was broadcast live on La 1 and TVE Internacional. RTVE also confirmed that Tony Aguilar and Julia Varela would return as commentators for the third year running.

Sandra Valero and the Spanish delegation also participated in the Opening Ceremony for the contest, which was held in Hotel Negresco in Nice on 20 November 2023, during which the running order was also determined. Spain was drawn to open the contest, and following the ceremony it was revealed that it would be preceding the entry from Malta.

=== Performance ===
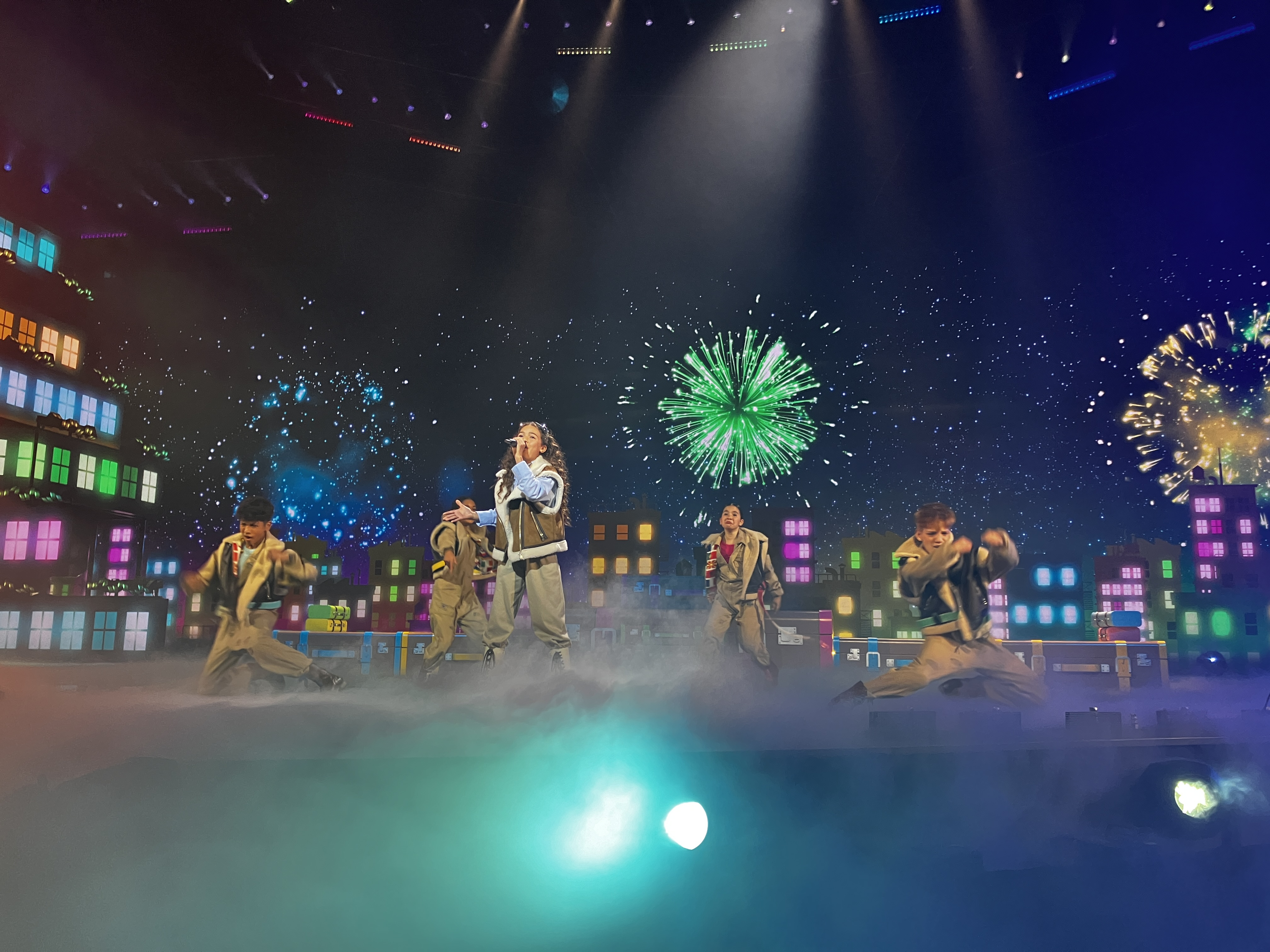
Sandra Valero performing during the jury show

The live performance for the Spanish entry in Nice featured similarities to the music video for the song, with RTVE previously stating that Javier Pageo, the creative director for the song, who had previously done stagings for multiple contestants of Benidorm Fest and would go on to stage the Sammarinese entry for the Eurovision Song Contest 2024 performed by Megara, would "be in charge of bringing the universe of the "Loviu" official video live into the Palais Nikaïa’s stage".

Accompanying Valero was a four-piece dance troupe consisting of Juan Diego Álvarez, Elia Cobo, Marcos Pelado, and Evelyn Casteñada, some of whom had previously regularly appeared as dancers for the Spanish entrants in the Junior Eurovision Song Contest. RTVE appointed Vicky Gómez as the choreographer, Verónica Ferreira as Valero's lead vocal coach, and Raúl Amor as the stylist for the performance.

The song was performed on a stage made of suitcases, while bright and colourful pastel visuals were displayed on the backing LED's showed a journey through Europe and space. The costumes for Valero and her dancers were inspired by aviator suits, including the one worn by Amelia Earhart. Valero's jacket included inscriptions of the words "love you" in 34 languages, including all co-official languages of Spain, while in the final shot the words were displayed on the backing LED's in the 16 official languages of the countries participating in the Junior Eurovision Song Contest 2023.

=== Voting ===
The same voting system that was introduced in the 2017 edition was used, where the results were determined by 50% online voting and 50% jury voting. Every participating broadcaster assembled a national jury that consisted of three music industry professionals and two children aged between 10 and 15 who were citizens of the country they represented. The rankings of those jurors were combined to make an overall top ten.

The online voting consisted of two phases. The first phase of the online voting began on 24 November 2023 when a recap of all the rehearsal performances was shown on the contest's website Junioreurovision.tv before the viewers could vote. After this, voters also had the option to watch longer one-minute clips from each participant's rehearsal. This first round of voting ended on 26 November at 15:59 CET. The second phase of the online voting took place during the live show and began right after the last performance and was open for 15 minutes. International viewers were able to vote for three songs. They were also able to vote for their own country's song. These votes were then turned into points which were determined by the percentage of votes received. For example, if a song received 10% of the votes, it received 10% of the available points.

At the end of the show, Spain received 115 points from juries and 86 points from online voting, placing 2nd behind France.

Points awarded to Spain
| Score | Country |
|---|---|
| 12 points | Estonia; France; Georgia; Italy |
| 10 points | Albania; Germany; Netherlands; North Macedonia |
| 8 points | United Kingdom |
| 7 points | |
| 6 points | Armenia; Malta |
| 5 points | Ukraine |
| 4 points | |
| 3 points | |
| 2 points | Poland |
| 1 point | |
Spain received 86 points from the online vote

Points awarded by Spain
| Score | Country |
|---|---|
| 12 points | France |
| 10 points | United Kingdom |
| 8 points | Poland |
| 7 points | Portugal |
| 6 points | Italy |
| 5 points | Georgia |
| 4 points | Netherlands |
| 3 points | Armenia |
| 2 points | North Macedonia |
| 1 point | Ukraine |

==== Detailed voting results ====
Each nation's jury consisted of five members: three adult music industry professionals and two children, who are citizens of the country they represent. This jury judged each entry based on: vocal capacity; the stage performance; the song's composition and originality; and the overall impression by the act. In addition, no member of a national jury was permitted to be related in any way to any of the competing acts in such a way that they cannot vote impartially and independently. The individual rankings of each jury member were released shortly after the contest.

The following members comprised the Spanish jury:

- Alfred García – singer-songwriter, represented Spain in the Eurovision Song Contest 2018
- Carlos Higes – singer, represented Spain in the Junior Eurovision Song Contest 2022
- Gonzalo Hermida – singer-songwriter
- Blanca Paloma – singer-songwriter, represented Spain in the Eurovision Song Contest 2023
- Martina Venecia Franco – actress

Detailed voting results from Spain
| Draw | Country | Juror A | Juror B | Juror C | Juror D | Juror E | Rank | Points |
|---|---|---|---|---|---|---|---|---|
| 01 | Spain | | | | | | | |
| 02 | Malta | 7 | 13 | 14 | 7 | 8 | 12 | |
| 03 | Ukraine | 10 | 7 | 6 | 11 | 11 | 10 | 1 |
| 04 | Ireland | 9 | 10 | 15 | 15 | 15 | 15 | |
| 05 | United Kingdom | 8 | 2 | 1 | 6 | 6 | 2 | 10 |
| 06 | North Macedonia | 6 | 11 | 8 | 9 | 5 | 9 | 2 |
| 07 | Estonia | 11 | 12 | 9 | 14 | 4 | 11 | |
| 08 | Armenia | 5 | 3 | 10 | 10 | 7 | 8 | 3 |
| 09 | Poland | 4 | 6 | 7 | 2 | 9 | 3 | 8 |
| 10 | Georgia | 12 | 14 | 13 | 1 | 2 | 6 | 5 |
| 11 | Portugal | 1 | 9 | 11 | 8 | 3 | 4 | 7 |
| 12 | France | 3 | 1 | 2 | 3 | 1 | 1 | 12 |
| 13 | Albania | 13 | 15 | 4 | 13 | 10 | 13 | |
| 14 | Italy | 2 | 8 | 5 | 4 | 12 | 5 | 6 |
| 15 | Germany | 15 | 5 | 12 | 12 | 14 | 14 | |
| 16 | Netherlands | 14 | 4 | 3 | 5 | 13 | 7 | 4 |

== After Junior Eurovision ==
Following Sandra Valero's return to Spain after the contest, a welcome press conference was organised on 28 November in RTVE's premises in Torrespaña, Madrid, led by María Eizaguirre, where the singer spoke about her experience performing in the Junior Eurovision Song Contest, reminiscing returning to the hotel after the contest where a group of Spaniards was waiting for her, including her family and friends, as well as the time spent with other contestants, as the most special moments of her experience, after which she and Eizaguirre thanked the press for the coverage given to Spain's participation in the contest.

On 14 February 2024, the European Broadcasting Union (EBU) and RTVE announced that the latter would host the 2024 contest, after 2023 winner, France Télévisions, opted against hosting. It was the first time that Spain hosted the contest and the first Eurovision event held in the country since the Eurovision Song Contest 1969.
