= Armenia in the Junior Eurovision Song Contest 2023 =

- Junior Eurovision Song Contest 2023
- Country: Armenia
- Selection process: Internal selection
- Announcement date: 25 October 2023

Competing entry
- Song: "Do It My Way"
- Artist: Yan Girls
- Songwriters: Tokionine; Vahram Petrosyan; Arpine Martoyan

Placement
- Final result: 3rd, 180 points

Participation chronology

Armenia was represented at the Junior Eurovision Song Contest 2023 in Nice, France, having internally selected its representatives, Yan Girls with the song "Do It My Way", written by Tokionine, Vahram Petrosyan and Arpine Martoyan, the latter of whom won the 2021 contest.

The group performed eighth in the running order, following the entry from Estonia and preceding the entry from Poland. Armenia finished in third position with 180 points, marking the eleventh time Armenia finished in the top five at the Junior Eurovision Song Contest.

== Background ==
Prior to the 2023 contest, Armenia had participated in the Junior Eurovision Song Contest fifteen times since its first entry in 2007. Armenia achieved its best result in 2010, winning with the song "Mama", performed by Vladimir Arzumanyan. Armenia then hosted the Junior Eurovision Song Contest 2011 in Yerevan.

Despite being included on the final list of participating countries, Armenia withdrew from the 2020 contest in November 2020 due to the then-ongoing Nagorno-Karabakh war. It was later revealed that Maléna had been internally selected to represent Armenia with the song "Why". With the Nagorno-Karabakh war ending on 10 November, Armenia's head of delegation David Tserunyan wrote on Instagram that the country would "come back stronger than ever". Armenia again selected Maléna to represent the country with "Qami Qami", and ultimately won the contest with 224 points. In the 2022 contest, Nare represented the country with her song "Dance!". The country ended in 2nd place out of 16 countries, achieving 180 points.

== Before Junior Eurovision ==
The Armenian entry for the 2023 contest was selected internally by the Armenian broadcaster AMPTV, which opened a submission process for interested artists aged between nine and fourteen on 4 July 2023. All submissions required participants to enter covers of two songs, with applications open until 23 July 2023. All entrants were to be citizens of Armenia and could be a soloist, duet or part of a group of up to six members. Following two rounds of auditions, an expert jury panel appointed by AMPTV determined the eventual representative for the country.

On 29 September 2023, following the 2023 Azerbaijani offensive in Nagorno-Karabakh and subsequent Flight of Nagorno-Karabakh Armenians, the European Broadcasting Union (EBU), revealed that they were monitoring the possibility of Armenian participation in the 2023 contest, with Executive Supervisor of the contest Martin Österdahl stating that "there is no definitive answer" to the question of Armenian participation.

On 25 October 2023, AMPTV officially announced that Yan Girls would represent Armenia in the 2023 contest with the song "Do It My Way". The song was written and composed by Tokionine, Vahram Petrosyan and Maléna, who were also responsible for Armenia's victory in the Junior Eurovision Song Contest 2021. Alongside the official release of the song, an accompanying music video was also premiered, which was directed by Artur Manukyan.

=== Preparation ===
On 12 November 2023, AMPTV broadcast a documentary Depi Mankakan Yevratesil 2023, accounting the journey of Yan Girls to the Junior Eurovision Song Contest 2023.

== At Junior Eurovision ==
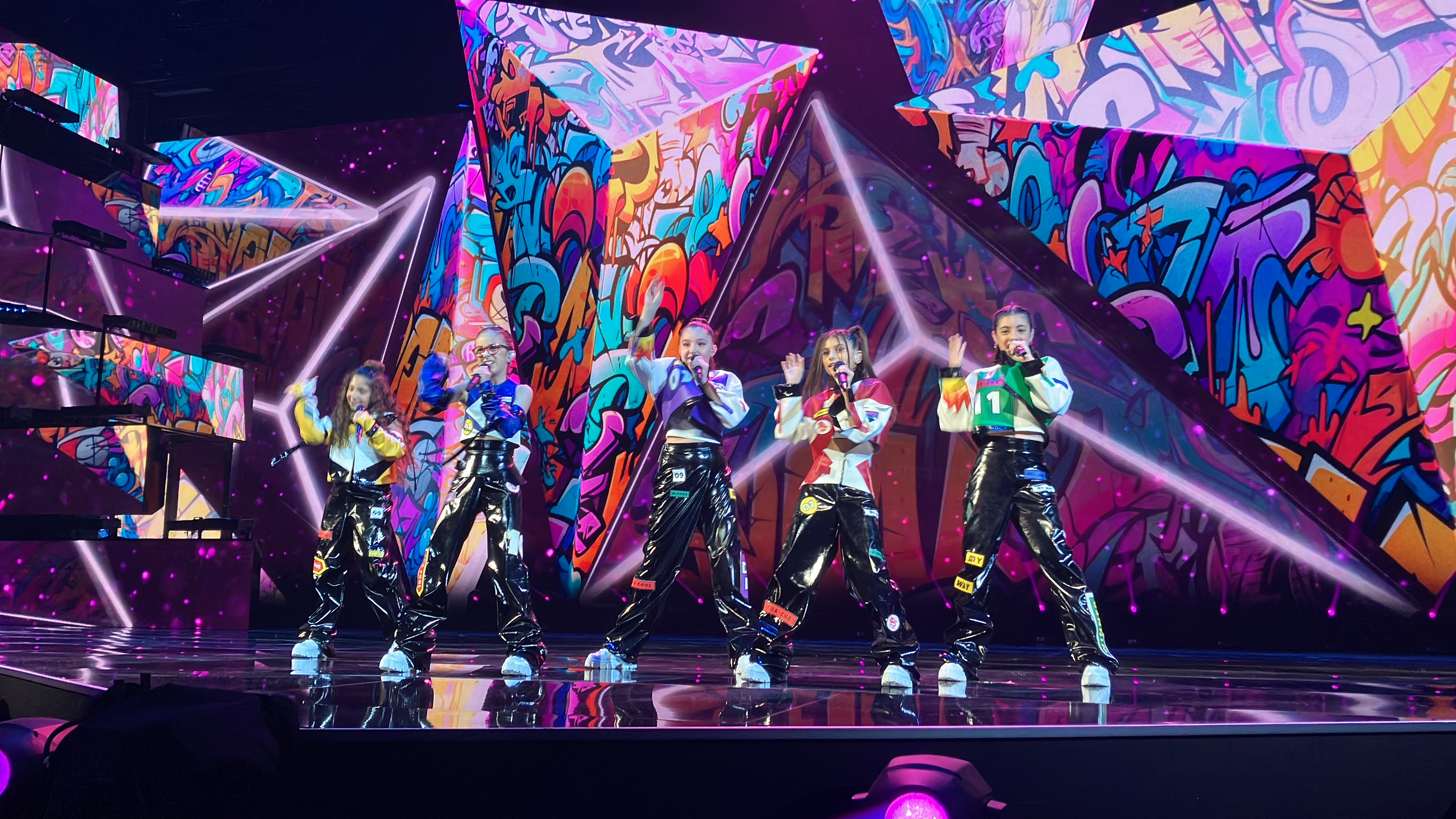
Yan Girls performing on stage during the jury show

The Junior Eurovision Song Contest 2023 took place at Palais Nikaïa in Nice, France on 26 November 2023.

=== Voting ===
The same voting system that was introduced in the 2017 edition was used, where the results were determined by 50% online voting and 50% jury voting. Every participating broadcaster assembled a national jury that consisted of three music industry professionals and two children aged between 10 and 15 who were citizens of the country they represented. The rankings of those jurors were combined to make an overall top ten.

The online voting consisted of two phases. The first phase of the online voting began on 24 November 2023 when a recap of all the rehearsal performances was shown on the contest's website Junioreurovision.tv before the viewers could vote. After this, voters also had the option to watch longer one-minute clips from each participant's rehearsal. This first round of voting ended on 26 November at 15:59 CET. The second phase of the online voting took place during the live show and began right after the last performance and was open for 15 minutes. International viewers were able to vote for three songs. They were also able to vote for their own country's song. These votes were then turned into points which were determined by the percentage of votes received. For example, if a song received 10% of the votes, it received 10% of the available points.

At the end of the show, Armenia received 116 points from juries and 64 points from online voting, placing third.

Points awarded to Armenia
Score	Country
12 points	Germany; Malta; North Macedonia; United Kingdom
10 points	Georgia; Ukraine
8 points	Estonia; Netherlands
7 points	France; Poland
6 points	Albania
5 points	Italy
4 points	
3 points	Spain
2 points	Ireland; Portugal
1 point	
Armenia received 64 points from the online vote

Points awarded by Armenia
Score	Country
12 points	Malta
10 points	France
8 points	United Kingdom
7 points	Albania
6 points	Spain
5 points	Poland
4 points	Georgia
3 points	Germany
2 points	Netherlands
1 point	North Macedonia

==== Detailed voting results ====
The following members comprised the Armenian jury:

- Artur Mnatsakanyan
- Narek Stepanyan
- Robert Koloyan
- Iveta Mukuchyan – represented Armenia in the Eurovision Song Contest 2016, hosted the 2022 contest
- Sati Sargsyan

Detailed voting results from Armenia
Draw	Country	Juror A	Juror B	Juror C	Juror D	Juror E	Rank	Points
01	Spain	6	6	5	7	3	5	6
02	Malta	1	1	1	3	2	1	12
03	Ukraine	10	14	12	9	10	12	
04	Ireland	15	9	10	15	15	14	
05	United Kingdom	2	8	2	1	4	3	8
06	North Macedonia	13	11	9	4	11	10	1
07	Estonia	14	10	11	13	9	13	
08	Armenia							
09	Poland	8	3	13	6	7	6	5
10	Georgia	7	7	6	8	6	7	4
11	Portugal	12	13	8	12	8	11	
12	France	4	4	3	2	1	2	10
13	Albania	5	2	4	10	5	4	7
14	Italy	11	15	15	14	14	15	
15	Germany	3	5	14	11	13	8	3
16	Netherlands	9	12	7	5	12	9	2
