= Ireland in the Junior Eurovision Song Contest 2023 =

- Junior Eurovision Song Contest 2023
- Country: Ireland
- Selection process: Artist: Junior Eurovision Éire 2023; Song: Internal selection
- Selection date: Artist: 8 October 2023; Song: 27 October 2023

Competing entry
- Song: "Aisling"
- Artist: Jessica McKean
- Songwriters: Niall Mooney; Ken McHugh; Will Weeks; Niamh Mooney; Sophie Lennon

Placement
- Final result: 16th, 42 points

Participation chronology

Ireland was represented at the Junior Eurovision Song Contest 2023, which was held on 26 November 2023 in Nice, France. Irish broadcaster TG4 again used the televised national final Junior Eurovision Éire to select the artist, which was won by Jessica McKean. Her song, "Aisling", was released on 27 October.

Ireland performed fourth in the running order, following the entry from Ukraine and preceding the entry from the United Kingdom. In a reversal of fortune from 2022, Ireland achieved its first last placing ever in the Junior Eurovision Song Contest, finishing in sixteenth place with 42 points.

== Background ==
Prior to the 2023 contest, Ireland had participated in the Junior Eurovision Song Contest seven times since its debut in 2015. In 2022, Sophie Lennon represented Ireland with the song "Solas". She finished 4th with 150 points and achieved Ireland's best result ever.

== Before Junior Eurovision ==
=== Junior Eurovision Éire 2023 ===
Irish broadcaster TG4 once again used the national selection format Junior Eurovision Éire to select its representative. The details of the competition were revealed on 22 August 2023. Louise Cantillon returned to host the show for the third time in a row, with Darragh Ó Caoimh serving as a co-host for the second year in a row. As in previous editions, an in-studio jury decided the results in the four heats and semi-final. As with the past two editions of the contest, the participants in Junior Eurovision Éire performed Irish-language cover versions of famous songs during the competition.

==== Jury members ====
As in previous editions, the results of the four heats and semi-final were decided by an in-studio jury of two permanent members and revolving guest judges. The two permanent judges are:

- Niamh Ní Chróinín – Radio presenter, manager of Irish-language youth radio station Raidió Rí-Rá
- Aindriú de Paor – RTÉ 2fm, RTÉ Sport and Spórt TG4 presenter

Guest judges
Artist	ESC Year(s)	Song(s)	Place (SF)	Points (SF)	Place (Final)	Points (Final)
Niamh Kavanagh	1993	"In Your Eyes"	No semi-finals		1	187
Niamh Kavanagh	2010	"It's for You"	9	67	23	25
Mickey Joe Harte	2003	"We've Got the World"	No semi-finals		11	53
Brian Kennedy	2006	"Every Song Is a Cry for Love"	9	79	10	93
Ryan O'Shaughnessy	2018	"Together"	6	179	16	136
Brooke Scullion	2022	"That's Rich"	15	47	Failed to qualify	
Conor O'Donohoe (Wild Youth)	2023	"We Are One"	12	10	Failed to qualify	

==== Heat 1 ====
The first heat was broadcast on 3 September 2023, with Brooke Scullion as the guest judge. Gilian Brennan received the highest number of stars and advanced directly to the semi-final, while Liza O'Neil and Sophia Connolly Deane advanced to the sing-off stage and performed their covers a second time. After their second performances, the jury members selected Liza as the winner, granting her a spot in the semi-final.

Heat 1 – 3 September 2023
Draw	Artist	Song (Original artists)	Juror 1	Juror 2	Juror 3	Stars	Result
1	Liza O'Neil	"Driver's Licence" (Olivia Rodrigo)	9	9	9	27	Sing-off
2	Gilian Brennan	"And I Am Telling You" (Jennifer Hudson)	9	10	10	29	Semi-final
3	Lottie O'Driscol Murray	"Ghost" (Ella Henderson)	7	9	9	25	Eliminated
4	Sophia Connolly Deane	"When the Party's Over" (Billie Eilish)	9	9	10	28	Sing-off
5	Alanna Manton	"New York" (Paloma Faith)	8	9	7	24	Eliminated
6	Kiefer Byrne	"Leave A Light On" (Tom Walker)	7	8	7	22	Eliminated

Sing-off – 3 September 2023
Draw	Artist	Song (Original artists)	Votes	Result
1	Liza O'Neil	"Driver's Licence" (Olivia Rodrigo)	2	Semi-final
2	Sophia Connolly Deane	"When the Party's Over" (Billie Eilish)	1	Eliminated

==== Heat 2 ====
The second heat was broadcast on 10 September 2023, with Niamh Kavanagh as the guest judge. Clare Keeley received the highest number of stars and advanced directly to the semi-final, while Jessica McKean and Charlotte Mackey advanced to the sing-off stage and performed their covers a second time. After their second performances, the jury members selected Jessica as the winner, granting her a spot in the semi-final.

Heat 2 – 10 September 2023
Draw	Artist	Song (Original artists)	Juror 1	Juror 2	Juror 3	Stars	Result
1	Jessica McKean	"I Will Always Love You" (Whitney Houston)	7	8	9	24	Sing-off
2	Clare Keeley	"Symphony" (Clean Bandit)	8	9	8	25	Semi-final
3	Michaela Grey	"Take Me to Church" (Hozier)	6	8	7	21	Eliminated
4	Kyla & Nicole Fox	"Ghost" (Luan Parle)	8	7	7	22	Eliminated
5	Charlotte Mackey	"September Song" (JP Cooper)	7	9	7	23	Sing-off
6	Abiha Mansoor	"Halo" (Beyoncé)	6	6	10	22	Eliminated

Sing-off – 10 September 2023
Draw	Artist	Song (Original artists)	Votes	Result
1	Jessica McKean	"I Will Always Love You" (Whitney Houston)	2	Semi-final
2	Charlotte Mackey	"September Song" (JP Cooper)	1	Eliminated

==== Heat 3 ====
The third heat was broadcast on 17 September 2023, with Ryan O'Shaughnessy as the guest judge. Ellen McGloughlin received the highest number of stars and advanced directly to the semi-final, while Niamh Beatrix Smith and Grace Ruane advanced to the sing-off stage and performed their covers a second time. After their second performances, the jury members selected Niamh Beatrix as the winner, granting her a spot in the semi-final.

Heat 3 – 17 September 2023
Draw	Artist	Song (Original artists)	Juror 1	Juror 2	Juror 3	Stars	Result
1	Ellen McGloughlin	"Perfect" (Eddi Reader)	8	10	8	26	Semi-final
2	Niamh Beatrix Smith	"Counting Stars" (OneRepublic)	8	9	8	25	Sing-off
3	Lara Gleeson	"If I Could Turn Back Time" (Cher)	7	8	8	23	Eliminated
4	Grace Ruane	"Stay with Me" (Sam Smith)	8	8	9	25	Sing-off
5	MJ Kearin	"Spotlight" (Jennifer Hudson)	7	8	9	24	Eliminated
6	Amy Cotter	"These Days" (Rudimental)	7	8	7	22	Eliminated

Sing-off – 17 September 2023
Draw	Artist	Song (Original artists)	Votes	Result
1	Niamh Beatrix Smith	"Counting Stars" (OneRepublic)	2	Semi-final
2	Grace Ruane	"Stay with Me" (Sam Smith)	1	Eliminated

==== Heat 4 ====
The fourth heat was broadcast on 24 September 2023, with Conor O'Donohoe as the guest judge. Sarah Burke received the highest number of stars and advanced directly to the semi-final, while Juliette Maguire and Lily-May Markham advanced to the sing-off stage and performed their covers a second time. After their second performances, the jury members selected Juliette as the winner, granting her a spot in the semi-final.

Heat 4 – 24 September 2023
Draw	Artist	Song (Original artists)	Juror 1	Juror 2	Juror 3	Stars	Result
1	Juliette Maguire	"Chandelier" (Sia)	7	8	6	21	Sing-off
2	Sarah Burke	"A Million Goodbyes" (Lea Heart)	8	9	9	26	Semi-final
3	Sophie O'Grady	"Castles" (Freya Ridings)	6	7	7	20	Eliminated
4	Lily-May Markham	"Nervous" (Gavin James)	7	8	7	22	Sing-off
5	Teagan Nolan	"The Man Who Can't Be Moved" (The Script)	7	7	6	20	Eliminated
6	Mary-Kate McSorley	"Can't Help Falling In Love" (Elvis Presley)	6	8	6	20	Eliminated

Sing-off – 24 September 2023
Draw	Artist	Song (Original artists)	Votes	Result
1	Lily-May Markham	"Nervous" (Gavin James)	1	Eliminated
2	Juliette Maguire	"Chandelier" (Sia)	2	Semi-final

==== Semi-final ====
The semi-final was broadcast on 1 October 2023, with Brian Kennedy as the guest judge. Clare Keeley and Niamh Beatrix Mith were both chosen by the jury to advance directly to the final. Jessica McKean and Liza O'Neil were both chosen to go through the sing-off stage and performed their covers a second time. After their second performances, the jury members selected Jessica as the winner, granting her a spot in the final.

Semi-final – 1 October 2023
Draw	Artist	Song (Original artists)	Result
1	Jessica McKean	"Skinny Love" (Bon Iver)	Sing-off
2	Clare Keeley	"Chandelier" (Sia)	Finalist
3	Liza O'Neil	"Eyes Closed" (Ed Sheeran)	Sing-off
4	Juliette Maguire	"Wake Me Up" (Avicii)	Eliminated
5	Gillian Brennan	"Grace" (Lewis Capaldi)	Eliminated
6	Niamh Beatrix Smith	"Radioactive" (Imagine Dragons)	Finalist
7	Ellen McGloughlin	"Lost Without You" (Freya Ridings)	Eliminated
8	Sarah Burke	"The Joker and the Queen" (Ed Sheeran)	Eliminated

Sing-off – 1 October 2023
Draw	Artist	Song (Original artists)	Votes	Result
1	Jessica McKean	"Skinny Love" (Bon Iver)	2	Finalist
2	Liza O'Neil	"Eyes Closed" (Ed Sheeran)	1	Eliminated

==== Final ====
The final took place on 8 October 2023, with Mickey Joe Harte as the guest judge. The jury of two permanent members and one rotating member was present once again to give feedback to the contestants, but did not have any voting power. For the second year in a row, the winner was selected exclusively by public online vote that ran on the TG4 Junior Eurovision website from 1 October, after the semi-final was broadcast, until the end of a 15-minute voting period during the final broadcast. The final had an average viewership of 19,700, and a total viewership of 104,000.

Final – 8 October 2023
Artist	Draw	Song (Original artists)	Draw	ESC Song (Original artists)
Jessica McKean	1	"Always" (Gavin James)	4	"Hold Me Now" (Johnny Logan)
Clare Keeley	2	"Someone You Loved" (Lewis Capaldi)	5	"Why Me?" (Linda Martin)
Niamh Beatrix Smith	3	"Waiting For Love" (Avicii)	6	"Together" (Ryan O'Shaughnessy)

== At Junior Eurovision ==
The Junior Eurovision Song Contest 2023 took place at Palais Nikaïa in Nice, France on 26 November 2023.

=== Voting ===
The same voting system that was introduced in the 2017 edition was used, where the results were determined by 50% online voting and 50% jury voting. Every participating broadcaster assembled a national jury that consisted of three music industry professionals and two children aged between 10 and 15 who were citizens of the country they represented. The rankings of those jurors were combined to make an overall top ten.

The online voting consisted of two phases. The first phase of the online voting began on 24 November 2023 when a recap of all the rehearsal performances was shown on the contest's website Junioreurovision.tv before the viewers could vote. After this, voters also had the option to watch longer one-minute clips from each participant's rehearsal. This first round of voting ended on 26 November at 15:59 CET. The second phase of the online voting took place during the live show and began right after the last performance and was open for 15 minutes. International viewers were able to vote for three songs. They were also able to vote for their own country's song. These votes were then turned into points which were determined by the percentage of votes received. For example, if a song received 10% of the votes, it received 10% of the available points.

At the end of the show, Ireland received 8 points from juries and 34 points from online voting, placing sixteenth out of sixteen. This was Ireland's first last place in the history of the contest.

Points awarded to Ireland
Score	Country
12 points	
10 points	
8 points	
7 points	
6 points	
5 points	
4 points	Portugal
3 points	Georgia
2 points	
1 point	France
Ireland received 34 points from the online vote

Points awarded by Ireland
Score	Country
12 points	France
10 points	Poland
8 points	Netherlands
7 points	Albania
6 points	Portugal
5 points	Italy
4 points	United Kingdom
3 points	Ukraine
2 points	Armenia
1 point	North Macedonia

==== Detailed voting results ====
The following members comprised the Irish jury:

- Cian O'Donnell
- Padraig Jack
- Seán Ó Heanaigh
- Clara Geraghty
- Gráinne Bleasdale

Detailed voting results from Ireland
Draw	Country	Juror A	Juror B	Juror C	Juror D	Juror E	Rank	Points
01	Spain	7	11	4	15	7	11	
02	Malta	14	9	11	7	11	14	
03	Ukraine	4	12	15	2	9	8	3
04	Ireland							
05	United Kingdom	12	6	7	14	1	7	4
06	North Macedonia	9	5	6	8	6	10	1
07	Estonia	3	14	12	12	10	13	
08	Armenia	8	3	5	9	12	9	2
09	Poland	2	8	3	13	4	2	10
10	Georgia	15	10	14	1	15	12	
11	Portugal	11	15	2	10	2	5	6
12	France	1	4	1	3	5	1	12
13	Albania	6	2	8	6	8	4	7
14	Italy	10	1	9	5	13	6	5
15	Germany	13	13	13	11	14	15	
16	Netherlands	5	7	10	4	3	3	8
