= Italy in the Junior Eurovision Song Contest 2023 =

- Junior Eurovision Song Contest 2023
- Country: Italy
- Selection process: Internal selection
- Announcement date: Artist: 4 October 2023; Song: 12 October 2023

Competing entry
- Song: "Un mondo giusto"
- Artist: Melissa and Ranya
- Songwriters: Franco Fasano; Marco Iardella

Placement
- Final result: 11th, 81 points

Participation chronology

Italy was represented at the Junior Eurovision Song Contest 2023 in Nice, France, with Melissa and Ranya performing "Un mondo giusto". Italian broadcaster RAI, responsible for the country's participation, selected its artists and song via an internal selection.

== Background ==
Prior to the 2023 contest, Italy has participated in the Junior Eurovision Song Contest eight times since its debut in 2014, having won the contest on their first appearance with the song "Tu primo grande amore", performed by Vincenzo Cantiello. On the country's most recent appearance, in 2022, the Italian broadcaster internally selected Chanel Dilecta to represent Italy at the contest with the song "Bla Bla Bla". She achieved eleventh place with 95 points.

Italy withdrew from the 2020 contest due to the COVID-19 pandemic, and despite initially announcing that they would not return in 2021, they ultimately announced their participation in the 2021 contest in France.

== Before Junior Eurovision ==
Upon confirming its participation in the 2023 contest, RAI declared it would internally select its entrant. On 4 October, RAI announced Melissa and Ranya – Melissa Agliottone and Ranya Moufidi, respectively the winner and one of the finalists of The Voice Kids – as the Italian representatives. Their entry, "Un mondo giusto", was composed by Franco Fasano and Marco Iardella in English and Italian, and was revealed on 12 October.

== At Junior Eurovision ==
The Junior Eurovision Song Contest 2023 took place at Palais Nikaïa in Nice, France on 26 November 2023.

=== Voting ===
The same voting system that was introduced in the 2017 edition was used, where the results were determined by 50% online voting and 50% jury voting. Every participating broadcaster assembled a national jury that consisted of three music industry professionals and two children aged between 10 and 15 who were citizens of the country they represented. The rankings of those jurors were combined to make an overall top ten.

The online voting consisted of two phases. The first phase of the online voting began on 24 November 2023 when a recap of all the rehearsal performances was shown on the contest's website Junioreurovision.tv before the viewers could vote. After this, voters also had the option to watch longer one-minute clips from each participant's rehearsal. This first round of voting ended on 26 November at 15:59 CET. The second phase of the online voting took place during the live show and began right after the last performance and was open for 15 minutes. International viewers were able vote for three songs. They were also able to vote for their own country's song. These votes were then turned into points which were determined by the percentage of votes received. For example, if a song received 10% of the votes, it received 10% of the available points.

At the end of the show, Italy received 37 points from juries and 44 points from online voting, placing 11th.

Points awarded to Italy
Score	Country
12 points	
10 points	
8 points	France; Georgia
7 points	
6 points	Spain
5 points	Ireland
4 points	
3 points	Estonia; Malta; Portugal
2 points	
1 point	North Macedonia
Italy received 44 points from the online vote

Points awarded by Italy
Score	Country
12 points	Spain
10 points	France
8 points	United Kingdom
7 points	Albania
6 points	Malta
5 points	Armenia
4 points	Netherlands
3 points	Georgia
2 points	Ukraine
1 point	Germany

==== Detailed voting results ====
The following members comprised the Italian jury:

- Andrea Devecchi
- Francesco Ferrero
- Maria Polidori
- Chiara Cappello
- Elisa Nali

Detailed voting results from Italy
Draw	Country	Juror A	Juror B	Juror C	Juror D	Juror E	Rank	Points
01	Spain	3	5	2	7	2	1	12
02	Malta	7	10	1	2	9	5	6
03	Ukraine	5	7	8	11	4	9	2
04	Ireland	14	15	5	12	15	13	
05	United Kingdom	1	3	14	5	3	3	8
06	North Macedonia	13	11	13	4	13	11	
07	Estonia	11	9	9	15	14	14	
08	Armenia	2	13	6	6	6	6	5
09	Poland	12	12	11	10	12	15	
10	Georgia	6	2	7	14	11	8	3
11	Portugal	9	14	15	9	8	12	
12	France	10	1	12	3	1	2	10
13	Albania	4	4	10	1	7	4	7
14	Italy							
15	Germany	15	6	3	13	10	10	1
16	Netherlands	8	8	4	8	5	7	4
