= Albania in the Junior Eurovision Song Contest 2023 =

Participation of Albania in Junior Eurovision in 2023

- Junior Eurovision Song Contest 2023
- Country: Albania
- Selection process: Junior Fest 2023
- Selection date: 22 September 2023

Competing entry
- Song: "Bota ime"
- Artist: Viola Gjyzeli
- Songwriters: Enis Mullaj; Eriona Rushiti

Placement
- Final result: 8th, 115 points

Participation chronology

Albania was represented at the Junior Eurovision Song Contest 2023 in Nice, France. Albanian broadcaster RTSH is responsible for the country's participation, and selected Viola Gjyzeli to represent the country with her song "Bota ime" through the national selection competition Junior Fest 2023.

== Background ==
Prior to the 2023 contest, Albania had participated in the Junior Eurovision Song Contest eight times since its first entry in 2012, only opting not to participate at the 2013, 2014 and 2020 contests. Albania has never won the contest, with their best result being in 2015, with the song "Dambaje" by Mishela Rapo achieving fifth place with a score of 93 points. In 2022, Kejtlin Gjata represented Albania in Yerevan, Armenia with the song "Pakëz diell". The country ended in 12th place out of 16 countries, achieving 94 points.

== Before Junior Eurovision ==
=== Junior Fest 2023 ===
The Albanian broadcaster Radio Televizioni Shqiptar (RTSH) revealed in July 2023 that the Albanian representative would be chosen via the national selection competition Junior Fest 2023. Bojken Lako was named as the creative director for the competition, which was to undergo changes as compared to previous years. Interested artists from Albania and Kosovo were able to send in their applications, starting from 20 July 2023 until 25 August 2023. The competing acts were revealed on 30 August. The final, originally scheduled to take place on 20 September, was broadcast live on 22 September at 20:30 CET from a temporary stage situated in front of the Pyramid of Tirana, marking the first live broadcast of Junior Fest since 2017. The winner was selected solely by a jury panel. In addition to the competition performances, Arsi Bako, Erma Mici, Niki Zaimi, Luna Çausholli, Melodajn Mancaku and Sardi Strugaj performed all throughout the show as interval acts.

Final – 22 September 2023
Draw	Artist	Song	Songwriter(s)
1	Amra Madani	"Rock Star"	Reinald Foçi
2	Françeska Kasa	"Perfekte Jam"	Ana Kodra
3	Elisa Skarra	"Një përqafim"	Enis Mullaj, Eriona Rushiti
4	Tea Metohu	"Smile"	Dorian Metohu
5	Rei Bardhollari	"Hasta mañana"	Adrian Hila
6	Fiona Resuli	"Lodroj me yjet"	Klodian Rexhepaj, Fran Ukcama
7	Viola Gjyzeli	"Bota ime"	Enis Mullaj, Eriona Rushiti
8	Irsa Haxhillari	"Melodinë e saj"	Melodajn Mancaku
9	Era Hasanaj	"Bisedë me një yll"	Alfred Kaçinari, Ana Kaçinari
10	Ea Zoga	"Lule n’zemrën tuaj"	Florent Boshnjaku, Ramazan Ceka
11	Nikol Çabeli	"Vetëm unë"	Melodajn Mancaku, Wendi Mancaku
12	Anja Canaj	"E dua erën"	Kristi Bello, Mimoza Bici Dhima
13	Marianxhela Rodakaj	"Afrika"	Enis Mullaj, Eriona Rushiti
14	Kejt Hitaj	"Eja"	Enis Mullaj, Eriona Rushiti
15	Ajshel Zykollari	"Pas ëndrrës time eja"	Miron Kotani, Mimoza Bici Dhima

== At Junior Eurovision ==
The Junior Eurovision Song Contest 2023 took place at Palais Nikaïa in Nice, France on 26 November 2023.

=== Voting ===
The same voting system that was introduced in the 2017 edition was used, where the results were determined by 50% online voting and 50% jury voting. Every participating broadcaster assembled a national jury that consisted of three music industry professionals and two children aged between 10 and 15 who were citizens of the country they represented. The rankings of those jurors were combined to make an overall top ten.

The online voting consisted of two phases. The first phase of the online voting began on 24 November 2023 when a recap of all the rehearsal performances was shown on the contest's website Junioreurovision.tv before the viewers could vote. After this, voters also had the option to watch longer one-minute clips from each participant's rehearsal. This first round of voting ended on 26 November at 15:59 CET. The second phase of the online voting took place during the live show and began right after the last performance and was open for 15 minutes. International viewers were able to vote for three songs. They were also able to vote for their own country's song. These votes were then turned into points which were determined by the percentage of votes received. For example, if a song received 10% of the votes, it received 10% of the available points.

At the end of the show, Albania received 70 points from juries and 45 points from online voting, placing 8th. This marked Albania's second-best result in the contest, following fifth place in 2015.

Points awarded to Albania
Score	Country
12 points	Portugal
10 points	
8 points	Ukraine
7 points	Armenia; Ireland; Italy; United Kingdom
6 points	
5 points	Estonia; North Macedonia
4 points	Georgia; Poland
3 points	France
2 points	
1 point	Netherlands
Albania received 45 points from the online vote

Points awarded by Albania
Score	Country
12 points	United Kingdom
10 points	Spain
8 points	Ukraine
7 points	France
6 points	Armenia
5 points	Netherlands
4 points	Malta
3 points	Poland
2 points	Germany
1 point	North Macedonia

==== Detailed voting results ====
The following members comprised the Albanian jury:

- Andi Lazaj
- David Kerri
- Serxhio Hajdini
- Anxhela Llaha
- Izabela Veliaj

Detailed voting results from Albania
Draw	Country	Juror A	Juror B	Juror C	Juror D	Juror E	Rank	Points
01	Spain	2	4	1	9	3	2	10
02	Malta	11	9	11	11	1	7	4
03	Ukraine	4	1	2	5	6	3	8
04	Ireland	14	10	14	15	9	14	
05	United Kingdom	3	2	6	1	2	1	12
06	North Macedonia	7	5	12	14	7	10	1
07	Estonia	8	12	7	8	8	11	
08	Armenia	9	6	3	2	10	5	6
09	Poland	5	8	9	10	5	8	3
10	Georgia	15	14	10	12	15	15	
11	Portugal	12	15	13	7	12	13	
12	France	6	3	4	3	4	4	7
13	Albania							
14	Italy	10	13	15	6	13	12	
15	Germany	13	11	5	4	11	9	2
16	Netherlands	1	7	8	13	14	6	5
