= Ukraine in the Junior Eurovision Song Contest 2023 =

- Junior Eurovision Song Contest 2023
- Country: Ukraine
- Selection process: National final
- Selection date: 1 October 2023

Competing entry
- Song: "Kvitka"
- Artist: Anastasiia Dymyd
- Songwriters: Svitlana Tarabarova

Placement
- Final result: 5th, 128 points

Participation chronology

Ukraine was represented at the Junior Eurovision Song Contest 2023 in France, which was held on 26 November 2023 in Nice. National broadcaster Suspilne was responsible for the participation and selected the nation's entrant via national selection, won by Anastasiia Dymyd with the song "Kvitka".

== Background ==
Prior to the 2023 contest, Ukraine had participated in the Junior Eurovision Song Contest fifteen times since its debut in 2006. Ukraine never missed a contest since their debut appearance, and won the contest once in 2012 with the song "Nebo", performed by Anastasiya Petryk. The Ukrainian capital Kyiv has hosted the contest twice, at the Palace of Sports in 2009, and the Palace "Ukraine" in 2013. In the 2022 contest, Zlata Dziunka represented the country in Yerevan, Armenia with the song the "Nezlamna (Unbreakable)", placing 9th out of 16 entries with 111 points.

== Before Junior Eurovision ==
=== National final ===
The Ukrainian broadcaster announced on 17 June 2023 that they would be participating at the 2023 contest.

==== Format ====
The final, which took place on 1 October 2023, featured five acts vying to represent Ukraine in Nice. The winner was selected by a 50/50 combination of votes from a public vote and an expert jury, the members of which were chosen by the public. Both the public and the expert jury assigned scores ranging from 1 (lowest) to 5 (highest) and the entry with the highest number of points following the combination of these scores was declared the winner. Viewers participating in the public vote had the opportunity to submit a single vote via the Diia e-governance app in two phases. The first phase of the voting based on presentation videos of the songs started on 29 September and ended on 1 October at 10:00 EET. The second phase of the online voting took place during the live show and started after the last performance, and was open for 15 minutes.

The voting for the expert jury was also conducted in the Diia mobile app: ten candidates were presented to the public and a voting was open from 11 to 17 September 2022, with the three candidates topping the online voting will be invited to become jurors of the show. The candidates in the running to become expert jurors were:

- Alyona Alyona – rapper, songwriter
- Eduard "Dilya" Prystupa – singer, musician, former member of TNMK
- Ihor Kondratyuk – television presenter, producer
- Jerry Heil – singer-songwriter, finalist of Vidbir in 2020 and 2023
- Kateryna Pavlenko – Ukrainian representative in the Eurovision Song Contest 2021 as part of Go_A, winner of Vidbir 2020
- Mykhailo Klymenko – singer, frontman of ADAM
- Olena Usenko – Ukrainian representative in the Junior Eurovision Song Contest 2021
- Pavlo Skorokhodko – actor, dubbing director, television presenter

The three selected jury members with the most votes were announced to be Ihor Kondratyuk, Jerry Heil and Alyona Alyona on 20 September 2023.

==== Competing entries ====
The submissions for the national selection with original songs or covers from Ukrainian citizens or Ukrainians living in other countries were accepted until 9 July 2022, with participants being required to submit a live performance of their entries recorded on a laptop or telephone without any alterations made to the recording.

Singer Svitlana Tarabarova, who had been appointed the music producer of the competition, with the cooperation of expert council consisting of Demchuk, Khayat and Cloud, reviewed the 143 received submissions and longlisted ten artists, who were announced on 13 July 2023. Five acts, announced on 24 July 2023, were selected to proceed to the final, while the competing songs – three of which were written by Tarabarova – were released on 30 August 2023.

Longlisted artists
- 3'beauties
- Anastasiia Bielibova
- Anastasiia Dymyd
- Anastasiia Piekh
- Anna Dolna
- Artem Kotenko
- Denys Hryshchuk
- Kateryna Yavorska
- Nika Yarovenko
- Polina Babiy

==== Final ====
The final took place on 1 October 2023, and was hosted by Timur Miroshnychenko and Anna Tulieva in Kyiv. The show was broadcast on Suspilne Kultura as well as online via Suspilne's Facebook and YouTube channels. In addition to the performances of the competing entries, Demchuk performed "Vichnist", Alyona Alyona performed "Ne vtratymo zv'yazok", Jerry Heil performed a medley of her songs and Zlata Dziunka performed "Nezlamna (Unbreakable)" as the interval acts.

Final – 1 October 2023
Draw	Artist	Song	Jury	Public voting	Total	Place
1	Polina Babiy	"Universe"	5	3	8	2
2	Anastasiia Dymyd	"Kvitka" (Квітка)	4	5	9	1
3	Anastasiia Bielibova	"Syl'na" (Сильна)	1	4	5	3
4	Denys Hryshchuk	"Dance"	2	1	3	5
5	3'beauties	"Power of Love"	3	2	5	4

== At Junior Eurovision ==
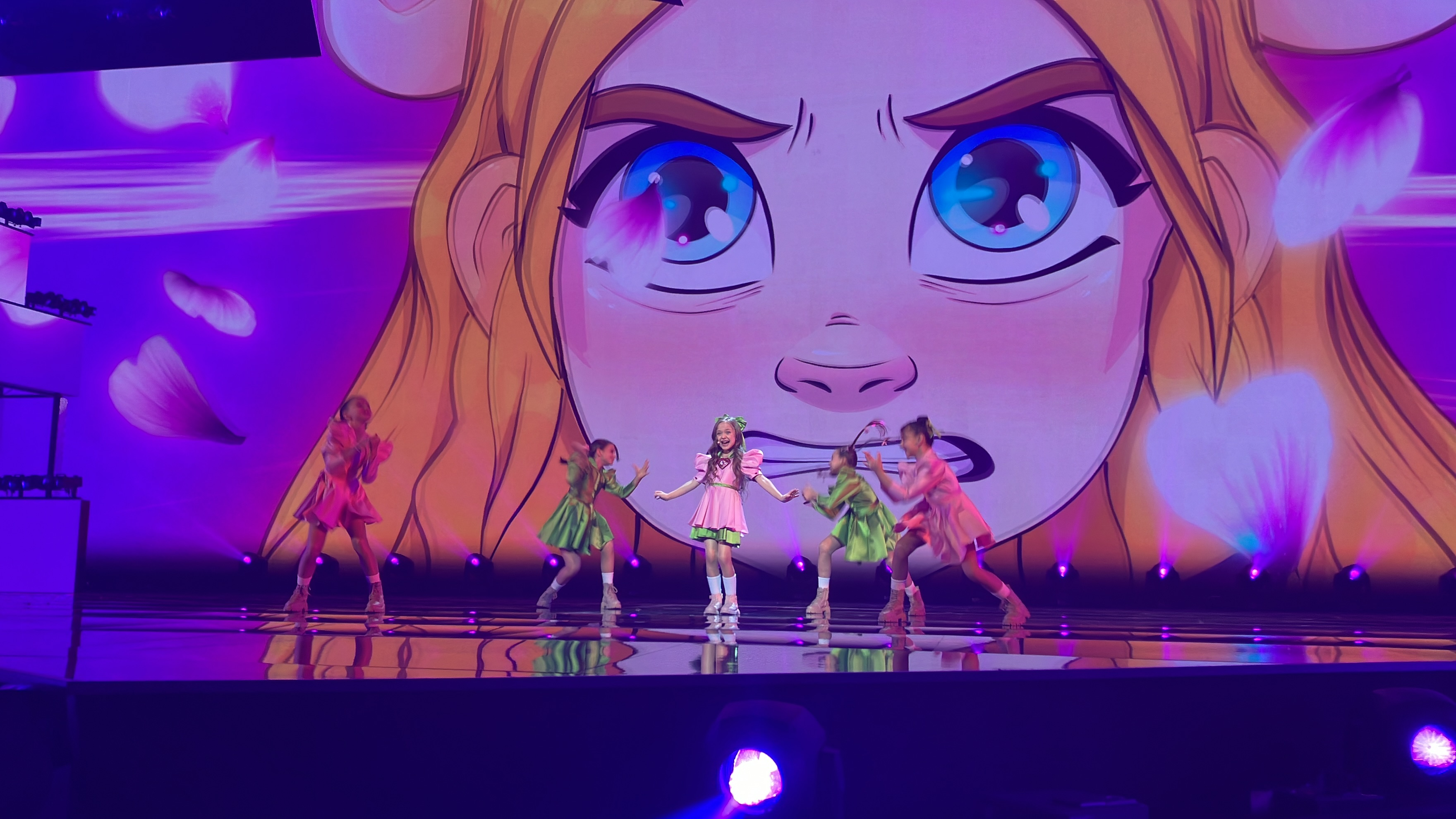
Anastasiia Dymyd performing on stage during the jury show

The Junior Eurovision Song Contest 2023 took place at Palais Nikaïa in Nice, France on 26 November 2023.

=== Voting ===
The same voting system that was introduced in the 2017 edition was used, where the results were determined by 50% online voting and 50% jury voting. Every participating broadcaster assembled a national jury that consisted of three music industry professionals and two children aged between 10 and 15 who were citizens of the country they represented. The rankings of those jurors were combined to make an overall top ten.

The online voting consisted of two phases. The first phase of the online voting began on 24 November 2023 when a recap of all the rehearsal performances was shown on the contest's website Junioreurovision.tv before the viewers could vote. After this, voters also had the option to watch longer one-minute clips from each participant's rehearsal. This first round of voting ended on 26 November at 15:59 CET. The second phase of the online voting took place during the live show and began right after the last performance and was open for 15 minutes. International viewers were able to vote for three songs. They were also able to vote for their own country's song. These votes were then turned into points which were determined by the percentage of votes received. For example, if a song received 10% of the votes, it received 10% of the available points.

At the end of the show, Ukraine received 45 points from juries and 83 points from online voting, placing 5th.

Points awarded to Ukraine
Score	Country
12 points	
10 points	
8 points	Albania
7 points	Germany
6 points	Georgia
5 points	Netherlands; Poland
4 points	Estonia
3 points	Ireland; North Macedonia
2 points	Italy
1 point	Spain; United Kingdom
Ukraine received 83 points from the online vote

Points awarded by Ukraine
Score	Country
12 points	United Kingdom
10 points	Armenia
8 points	Albania
7 points	Poland
6 points	France
5 points	Spain
4 points	Germany
3 points	Malta
2 points	North Macedonia
1 point	Estonia

==== Detailed voting results ====
The following members comprised the Ukrainian jury:

- Artem Kotenko
- Yuriy Tkach
- Antonina Matviyenko
- Anastasiia Bielibova
- Alyosha – represented Ukraine in the Eurovision Song Contest 2010

Detailed voting results from Ukraine
Draw	Country	Juror A	Juror B	Juror C	Juror D	Juror E	Rank	Points
01	Spain	6	3	7	7	7	6	5
02	Malta	2	6	15	11	6	8	3
03	Ukraine							
04	Ireland	10	14	9	15	9	12	
05	United Kingdom	5	1	3	1	1	1	12
06	North Macedonia	3	8	10	10	5	9	2
07	Estonia	13	9	8	9	4	10	1
08	Armenia	4	2	5	2	3	2	10
09	Poland	7	4	4	3	13	4	7
10	Georgia	11	10	14	13	12	13	
11	Portugal	15	15	13	8	14	15	
12	France	9	7	2	4	8	5	6
13	Albania	1	5	11	12	2	3	8
14	Italy	14	11	12	14	10	14	
15	Germany	8	13	1	5	11	7	4
16	Netherlands	12	12	6	6	15	11	
