= Poland in the Junior Eurovision Song Contest 2023 =

- Junior Eurovision Song Contest 2023
- Country: Poland
- Selection process: Artist: Szansa na sukces; Song: Internal selection
- Selection date: Heats; 3 September 2023; 10 September 2023; 17 September 2023; Final; 24 September 2023

Competing entry
- Song: "I Just Need a Friend"
- Artist: Maja Krzyżewska
- Songwriters: Patryk Kumór; Carla Fernandes; Marissa; Dominic Buczkowski-Wojtaszek; Piotr Zborowski

Placement
- Final result: 6th, 124 points

Participation chronology

Poland was represented at the Junior Eurovision Song Contest 2023 in Nice, France. Polish broadcaster Telewizja Polska (TVP) was responsible for the country's participation in the contest and again chose the Polish artist through the national selection Szansa na sukces, won by Maja Krzyżewska and her rendition of the internally selected song "I Just Need a Friend".

== Background ==
Prior to the 2023 contest, Poland had participated in the contest nine times: In 2003 and 2004, Poland finished in last place, and they decided not to participate from 2005 to 2015. The country returned in 2016. Olivia Wieczorek was selected to represent the nation that year with the song "Nie zapomnij". Olivia finished in 11th place out of 17 entries with 60 points. In both 2018 and 2019, Poland won the Junior Eurovision Song Contest with Roksana Węgiel and Viki Gabor respectively, becoming the first country to win the contest twice in a row. In 2022, Laura competed for Poland with the song "To the Moon" which ended up in 10th place out of 16 entries with 95 points.

== Before Junior Eurovision ==
=== Szansa na sukces ===
TVP selected the Polish representative with the television program Szansa na sukces (transl. Chance of Success); the same show was also used for the Junior Eurovision Song Contest since 2019, and various times for the Eurovision Song Contest. The competition consisted of four shows which concluded with a winning artist and competing song reveal on 24 September 2023. The shows were broadcast on TVP2, as well as online via the platform TVP VOD and at the broadcaster's website tvp.pl, hosted by Aleksander Sikora, who also hosted the Junior Eurovision Song Contest 2019.

==== Format ====
The casting for the show took place on 13 and 14 May, from which twenty-one acts were selected to advance to the competition. The format of the national final consisted of four shows: three pre-recorded heats with seven contestants each broadcast on 3, 10 and 17 September 2023, respectively, and a final broadcast live on 24 September 2023. In each heat, the contestants performed cover versions of randomly drawn songs and a three-member professional jury consisting of Marek Sierocki (Polish commentator of the Junior Eurovision Song Contest) and 2 unique members for each episode selected the winner of the episode which qualifies to the final and a runner-up which receives an honourable mention, but does not advance to the final. TVP reserved the right to select up to two wildcard contestants to advance to the final as well, with those contestants being given the Golden Ticket in the broadcast of the heat they competed in.

The final featured the remaining contestants again performing cover versions of randomly drawn songs that were already performed during the heats, after which the 50/50 combination of votes from a three-member professional jury and a public vote decided the 2 superfinalists. The superfinalists then performed their renditions of the internally selected Polish entry, after which the winner was selected solely by public vote.

==== Shows ====
===== Heat 1 =====
The first heat was broadcast on 3 September 2023 at 15:15 CEST. Joining permanent juror Marek Sierocki on the jury panel were:

- Sara James – singer, runner-up of the Junior Eurovision Song Contest 2021
- Tulia – folk music band, represented Poland in the Eurovision Song Contest 2019

The season premiere was watched by 868,845 viewers with a market share of 10.66%.

Key: Jury finalist Wildcard finalist Honourable mention

Heat 1 – 3 September 2023
Draw	Artist	Song	Result
1	Elena Popowicz	"Euphoria"	Eliminated
2	Miłosz Zarzeka	"Color of Your Life"	Eliminated
3	Daria Malicka	"Easy on Me"	Advanced
4	Leon Olek	"Counting Stars"	Advanced
5	Hanna Adamczyk	"Somebody"	Eliminated
6	Olivka Majewska	"Snap"	Eliminated
7	Patrycja Kulicka	"If I Were Sorry"	Eliminated

===== Heat 2 =====
The second heat was broadcast on 10 September 2023 at 15:15 CEST. Joining permanent juror Marek Sierocki on the jury panel were:

- Cleo – singer-songwriter, represented Poland in the Eurovision Song Contest 2014
- Roksana Węgiel – singer, winner of the Junior Eurovision Song Contest 2018

The subsequent heat was watched by 756,545 viewers with a market share of 10.25%.

Key: Jury finalist Wildcard finalist Honourable mention

Heat 2 – 10 September 2023
Draw	Artist	Song	Result
1	Kornelia Woźniak	"Arcade"	Eliminated
2	Gracjana Górka	"Rise Up"	Advanced
3	Zuzanna Talkowska	"Solo"	Eliminated
4	Filip Robak	"Stand Up for Love"	Advanced
5	Viktoriia Tsariuk	"Photograph"	Eliminated
6	Helena Włodarczyk	"Anyone I Want to Be"	Eliminated
7	Małgorzata Manthey	"Flowers"	Eliminated

===== Heat 3 =====
The third heat was broadcast on 17 September 2023 at 15:15 CEST. Joining permanent juror Marek Sierocki on the jury panel were:

- Gromee – DJ, represented Poland in the Eurovision Song Contest 2018
- Viki Gabor – singer, winner of the Junior Eurovision Song Contest 2019

The final heat was watched by 679,452 viewers with a market share of 9.57%.

Key: Jury finalist Wildcard finalist Honourable mention

Heat 3 – 17 September 2023
Draw	Artist	Song	Result
1	Sabina Bednarz	"Dance Monkey"	Eliminated
2	Emilia Franica	"Superhero"	Eliminated
3	Antoni Pytlak	"Rain on Me"	Eliminated
4	Antonina Smerkowska	"Anywhere"	Eliminated
5	Natalia Pawelska	"Light Me Up"	Eliminated
6	Kornelia Sadowska	"As It Was"	Eliminated
7	Maja Krzyżewska	"Set Fire to the Rain"	Advanced

===== Final =====
The live final took place on 24 September 2023 at 15:10 CEST. The jury voting in the first round consisted of chairperson Konrad Smuga (Art Director of the Polish performances in the Junior Eurovision Song Contest), as well as Daria Barycka (head of the TVP Entertainment Creation and Development Agency) and Grzegorz Urban (musical director of Szansa na sukces). A commentary panel consisting of Blanka (represented Poland in the Eurovision Song Contest 2023), Laura (represented Poland in the Junior Eurovision Song Contest 2022) and permanent juror Marek Sierocki provided feedback in regards to the show, but did not have voting power.

In addition to the performances of the competing entries, Laura performed "To the Moon" as the interval act. At the end of the show, 12 year-old Maja Krzyżewska was announced as the winner of Szansa na sukces. Krzyżewska had previously competed in the sixth series of the Polish version of The Voice Kids. The final was watched by 1,067,479 viewers with a market share of 12.19%.

First round – 24 September 2023
Draw	Artist	Song	Jury	Televote	Total	Place
1	Gracjana Górka	"Flowers"	3	1	4	5
2	Leon Olek	"Dance Monkey"	7	5	12	1
3	Daria Malicka	"Snap"	5	2	7	3
4	Filip Robak	"As It Was"	2	3	5	4
5	Maja Krzyżewska	"Photograph"	1	7	8	2

Second round – 24 September 2023
Draw	Artist	Song
1	Leon Olek	"I Just Need a Friend"
2	Maja Krzyżewska	"I Just Need a Friend"

=== Preparation ===
The shooting of the music video for "I Just Need a Friend", directed by Dawid Ziemba of Mind Productions, commenced in early October. A revamped version of the entry was released on streaming platforms on 19 October, with the official music video being published the next day. For the seventh year in a row Konrad Smuga, director of the 2019 and 2020 Junior Eurovision Song Contest, was appointed as the stage director of the Polish entry, while Paulina Przestrzeska, who was responsible for the performance of Sara James in the Junior Eurovision Song Contest 2021, was appointed as the lead choreographer.

TVP held a press conference on 16 October, in which it was revealed that Maja would be joined by 4 dancers from the Volt Dance Studio and that the performance would include photos of her with her family from when she was a child. The press conference also served as a send-off ceremony before her scheduled flight to Nice.

=== Promotion ===
Following her selection, Maja Krzyżewska embarked on several promotional activities, appearing on the TVP2 morning show Pytanie na śniadanie several times, most notably after she won Szansa na sukces. On 18 November 2023 she performed during the semi-final of the fourteenth season of The Voice of Poland.

== At Junior Eurovision ==
The Junior Eurovision Song Contest 2023 took place at Palais Nikaïa in Nice, France on 26 November 2023.

=== Voting ===
The same voting system that was introduced in the 2017 edition was used, where the results were determined by 50% online voting and 50% jury voting. Every participating broadcaster assembled a national jury that consisted of three music industry professionals and two children aged between 10 and 15 who were citizens of the country they represented. The rankings of those jurors were combined to make an overall top ten.

The online voting consisted of two phases. The first phase of the online voting began on 24 November 2023 when a recap of all the rehearsal performances was shown on the contest's website Junioreurovision.tv before the viewers could vote. After this, voters also had the option to watch longer one-minute clips from each participant's rehearsal. This first round of voting ended on 26 November at 15:59 CET. The second phase of the online voting took place during the live show and began right after the last performance and was open for 15 minutes. International viewers were able to vote for three songs. They were also able to vote for their own country's song. These votes were then turned into points which were determined by the percentage of votes received. For example, if a song received 10% of the votes, it received 10% of the available points.

At the end of the show, Poland received 69 points from juries and 55 points from online voting, placing 6th.

Points awarded to Poland
Score	Country
12 points	
10 points	Ireland; United Kingdom
8 points	Portugal; Spain
7 points	Ukraine
6 points	Germany; Netherlands
5 points	Armenia
4 points	Malta
3 points	Albania
2 points	Estonia
1 point	
Poland received 55 points from the online vote

Points awarded by Poland
Score	Country
12 points	France
10 points	North Macedonia
8 points	United Kingdom
7 points	Armenia
6 points	Netherlands
5 points	Ukraine
4 points	Albania
3 points	Malta
2 points	Spain
1 point	Portugal

==== Detailed voting results ====
The following members comprised the Polish jury:

- Leon Olek
- Piotr Matysik
- Rafał Brzozowski – host of the Junior Eurovision Song Contest 2020, represented Poland in the Eurovision Song Contest 2021
- Aleksandra Radwan
- Daria Malicka

Detailed voting results from Poland
Draw	Country	Juror A	Juror B	Juror C	Juror D	Juror E	Rank	Points
01	Spain	7	8	11	5	8	9	2
02	Malta	15	4	12	9	1	8	3
03	Ukraine	2	13	15	1	12	6	5
04	Ireland	6	10	14	12	9	13	
05	United Kingdom	1	12	4	7	3	3	8
06	North Macedonia	8	3	2	2	4	2	10
07	Estonia	14	5	13	15	10	14	
08	Armenia	4	14	7	6	2	4	7
09	Poland							
10	Georgia	9	15	10	11	13	15	
11	Portugal	12	7	9	4	11	10	1
12	France	3	6	1	3	5	1	12
13	Albania	10	1	3	14	15	7	4
14	Italy	11	11	5	8	14	11	
15	Germany	13	9	8	13	6	12	
16	Netherlands	5	2	6	10	7	5	6
