= Netherlands in the Junior Eurovision Song Contest 2023 =

- Junior Eurovision Song Contest 2023
- Country: Netherlands
- Selection process: Junior Songfestival 2023
- Selection date: 23 September 2023

Competing entry
- Song: "Holding On to You"
- Artist: Sep and Jasmijn
- Songwriters: Robert Dorn

Placement
- Final result: 7th, 122 points

Participation chronology

The Netherlands was represented at the Junior Eurovision Song Contest 2023 in France, which was held in Nice on 26 November 2023. Sep and Jasmijn were selected by AVROTROS to represent the country with their song "Holding On to You" through the televised national selection Junior Songfestival 2023.

== Background ==
The Netherlands is the only country to have participated in every edition of the Junior Eurovision Song Contest since the inaugural 2003 edition. The Netherlands have won the contest on one occasion: in 2009 with the song "Click Clack", performed by Ralf Mackenbach. In the 2022 contest in Yerevan, Armenia, Luna represented the Netherlands with the song "La festa". She finished in 7th place with 128 points.

== Before Junior Eurovision ==
=== Junior Songfestival 2023 ===
AVROTROS selected the Dutch representative through the televised national final Junior Songfestival, held on 23 September 2023 at the RTM Stage in Rotterdam, a part of the Ahoy venue complex, hosted by Matheu Hinzen and Stefania.

==== Competing entries ====
Following the 2022 edition of the competition, the submissions process was opened for singers who want to represent the Netherlands in the 2023 contest. Following a call for participants which closed on 6 February 2023, NPO Zapp revealed the list of singers who made it through to the auditions round on 14 February. The auditions were broadcast in a series of three reveal videos published between 21 April and 19 May on the official Junior Songfestival YouTube channel. A total of 51 acts took part in the auditions, and 24 entrants passed to the academy stage of the selection. The finalists were revealed on 16 June 2023. They were then grouped into 4 acts–one male soloist, one mixed duo and two female trios, all being assigned original songs written by well-known songwriters. The competing entries were revealed on 3 July.

Artist	Song	Songwriter(s)	Language(s)	Ref.
Duron	"Magic"	Hansen Tomas; Simon Gitsels	Dutch, English	
Flare	"Side by Side"	Jermain van der Bogt; Willem Laseroms	Dutch, English	
Joy!	"Better Together"	Didier de Ruyter; Kirsten Michel	Dutch, English	
Sep and Jasmijn	"Holding On to You"	Robert Dorn	Dutch, English	

==== Final ====
The final took place on 23 September 2023 at 19:20 CET. During the online voting window of the final, the finalists performed a common theme song titled "Good Vibes". The winner was determined through points given by a kids jury, a professional jury and public voting, each having equal weight. The kids jury consisted of Junior Songfestival 2022 winner Luna and finalist Mixed Up, while the professional jury consisted of Soy Kroon, Sosha Duysker and Meau.

Junior Songfestival – 23 September 2023
Draw	Artist	Song	Points				Place
Draw	Artist	Song	Kids jury	Prof. jury	Online vote	Total	Place
1	Duron	"Magic"	9	9	8	26	4
2	Flare	"Side by Side"	8	8	10	26	3
3	Joy!	"Better Together"	10	10	9	29	2
4	Sep and Jasmijn	"Holding On to You"	12	12	12	36	1

== At Junior Eurovision ==
The Junior Eurovision Song Contest 2023 took place at Palais Nikaïa in Nice, France on 26 November 2023.

=== Voting ===
The same voting system that was introduced in the 2017 edition was used, where the results were determined by 50% online voting and 50% jury voting. Every participating broadcaster assembled a national jury that consisted of three music industry professionals and two children aged between 10 and 15 who were citizens of the country they represented. The rankings of those jurors were combined to make an overall top ten.

The online voting consisted of two phases. The first phase of the online voting began on 24 November 2023 when a recap of all the rehearsal performances was shown on the contest's website Junioreurovision.tv before the viewers could vote. After this, voters also had the option to watch longer one-minute clips from each participant's rehearsal. This first round of voting ended on 26 November at 15:59 CET. The second phase of the online voting took place during the live show and began right after the last performance and was open for 15 minutes. International viewers were able to vote for three songs. They were also able to vote for their own country's song. These votes were then turned into points which were determined by the percentage of votes received. For example, if a song received 10% of the votes, it received 10% of the available points.

At the end of the show, the Netherlands received 52 points from juries and 70 points from online voting, placing 7th.

Points awarded to the Netherlands
Score	Country
12 points	
10 points	
8 points	Ireland
7 points	Malta
6 points	North Macedonia; Poland
5 points	Albania; United Kingdom
4 points	Italy; Spain
3 points	Germany
2 points	Armenia; France
1 point	
Netherlands received 70 points from the online vote

Points awarded by the Netherlands
Score	Country
12 points	France
10 points	Spain
8 points	Armenia
7 points	United Kingdom
6 points	Poland
5 points	Ukraine
4 points	Germany
3 points	North Macedonia
2 points	Portugal
1 point	Albania

==== Detailed voting results ====
The following members comprised the Dutch jury:

- Niels Schlimback
- Peter Natrop
- Sam Terbraak
- Marieke van Oostrum
- Zoë Aries

Detailed voting results from Netherlands
Draw	Country	Juror A	Juror B	Juror C	Juror D	Juror E	Rank	Points
01	Spain	2	2	1	2	7	2	10
02	Malta	14	14	15	15	13	15	
03	Ukraine	6	5	4	13	6	6	5
04	Ireland	9	11	13	14	15	13	
05	United Kingdom	5	3	5	7	1	4	7
06	North Macedonia	12	7	7	6	8	8	3
07	Estonia	8	13	9	11	12	11	
08	Armenia	3	4	6	1	2	3	8
09	Poland	11	6	8	4	3	5	6
10	Georgia	13	9	14	9	10	12	
11	Portugal	7	10	10	5	9	9	2
12	France	1	1	2	3	5	1	12
13	Albania	10	12	12	8	4	10	1
14	Italy	15	15	11	10	14	14	
15	Germany	4	8	3	12	11	7	4
16	Netherlands							
