= Georgia in the Junior Eurovision Song Contest 2023 =

- Junior Eurovision Song Contest 2023
- Country: Georgia
- Selection process: Artist: Ranina 2023; Song: Internal selection
- Selection date: Artist: 10 June 2023; Song: 15 October 2023

Competing entry
- Song: "Over the Sky"
- Artist: Anastasia and Ranina
- Songwriters: Betkho; Mebo Nutsubidze

Placement
- Final result: 14th, 74 points

Participation chronology

Georgia was represented at the Junior Eurovision Song Contest 2023 in France, which was held in Nice on 26 November 2023. The children's talent show Ranina was used for the sixth year in a row to select Georgia's representative, Anastasia Vasadze. Later, it was revealed that she would be joined by Nikoloz Kharati and Oto Bazerashvlili. The trio represented Georgia with the song "Over the Sky".

== Background ==
Prior to the 2023 contest, Georgia had participated in the Junior Eurovision Song Contest fifteen times since its debut in 2007, and since then they have never missed a single contest. Georgia is also the most successful country in the competition, with three victories in 2008, 2011 and 2016. In the 2022 contest, Mariam Bigvava represented Georgia with the song "I Believe" following her victory in the fifth season of Ranina, achieving 3rd place out of 16 with 161 points.

== Before Junior Eurovision ==
=== Ranina ===
For the sixth year in a row, Georgia used an original children's talent show format, Ranina (Georgian: რანინა), as the selection method for their artist. Georgian broadcaster GPB confirmed that Ranina would be used for the sixth time in December 2022. The list of participants competing in the show was revealed on 1 February 2023, confirming that the show would once again have 10 competitors. On 29 March, GPB announced that Ranina's first episode will be aired on 1 April.

Classical pianist David Aladashvili remained as the main host of the show. Last years finalist Vache Ghviniashvili joined him as co-host.

List of contestants
Name	Age (Note: As of 1 February 2023, the day when the list of contestants was released by GPB.)	Main round scores					Semi-final	Finale
Name	Age	Tour 1	Tour 2	Tour 3	Tour 4	Combined score	Semi-final	Finale
Anastasia Vasadze (ანასტასია ვასაძე)	11 years old	120	120	120	120	480	Qualified	Winner
Anastasia Berishvili (ანასტასია ბერიშვილი)	9 years old	120	120	120	120	480	Qualified	Finalist
Tamar Tomashvili (თამარ თომაშვილი)	12 years old	120	120	120	120	480	Qualified	Finalist
Soso Chachua (სოსო ჩაჩუა)	13 years old	120	120	120	120	480	Qualified	Finalist
Gabriel Lomsadze (გაბრიელ ლომსაძე)	11 years old	119	120	120	120	479	Qualified	Finalist
Anaroza Gaprindashvili (ანაროზა გაფრინდაშვილი)	9 years old	118	120	120	119	477	Eliminated	Did not qualify
Anastasia Masurashvili (ანასტასია მასურაშვილი)	11 years old	120	120	120	117	477	Eliminated	Did not qualify
Datuna Kereselidze (დათუნა კერესელიძე)	11 years old	117	120	120	119	476	Eliminated	Did not qualify
Demetre Okriashvili (დემეტრე ოქრიაშვილი)	13 years old	118	117	120	118	473	Eliminated	Did not qualify
Mariam Gomiashvili (მარიამ გომიაშვილი)	12 years old	115	119	120	118	472	Eliminated	Did not qualify

==== Round 1 ====
The shows of round 1 took place on 1 and 15 April 2023. (Note: The show was originally scheduled to air on 8 April, but was postponed 1 week due to technical issues.) The candidates performed in a duet with participants from previous seasons including the winners from 2020-2022 Sandra Gadelia, Niko Kajaia and Mariam Bigvava. The jury members for this round were Giorgi Asanishvili, Dato Evgenidze, and Liza Bagrationi.

Show 1 – 1 April 2023
Draw	Artist	Song	Jury scores			Final score
Draw	Artist	Song	G. Asanishvili	D. Evgenidze	L. Bagrationi	Final score
1	Anaroza Gaprindashvili (with Vache Ghviniashvili)	"Iq’o da ara" (იყო და არა)	39 (9 | 10 | 10 | 10)	39 (10 | 9 | 10 | 10)	40 (10 | 10 | 10 | 10)	118
2	Mariam Gomiashvili (with Gega Shonia)	"Tovs da bardnis" (თოვს და ბარდნის)	38 (9 | 9 | 10 | 10)	39 (10 | 9 | 10 | 10)	38 (9 | 9 | 10 | 10)	115
3	Anastasia Vasadze (with Oto Bazerashvili)	"Nat’vris khe" (ნატვრის ხე)	40 (10 | 10 | 10 | 10)	40 (10 | 10 | 10 | 10)	40 (10 | 10 | 10 | 10)	120
4	Demetre Okriashvili (with Sandra Gadelia)	"Gashale prtebii" (გაშალე ფრთები)	40 (10 | 10 | 10 | 10)	39 (10 | 9 | 10 | 10)	39 (10 | 9 | 10 | 10)	118
5	Datuna Kereselidze (with Nikoloz Kharati)	"Sat’rpialo" (სატრფიალო)	39 (10 | 9 | 10 | 10)	39 (10 | 9 | 10 | 10)	39 (9 | 10 | 10 | 10)	117

Show 2 – 15 April 2023
Draw	Artist	Song	Jury Score			Final Score
Draw	Artist	Song	G. Asanishvili	D. Evgenidze	L. Bagrationi	Final Score
1	Anastasia Masurashvili (with Nikoloz Kajaia)	"Sizmari" (სიზმარი)	40 (10 | 10 | 10 | 10)	40 (10 | 10 | 10 | 10)	40 (10 | 10 | 10 | 10)	120
2	Tamar Tomashvili (with Anastasia Garsevanishvili)	"Rats q’velaze dzalian gviq’vars" (რაც ყველაზე ძალიან გვიყვარს)	40 (10 | 10 | 10 | 10)	40 (10 | 10 | 10 | 10)	40 (10 | 10 | 10 | 10)	120
3	Gabriel Lomsadze (with Barbare Makhatadze)	"Tbiliso" (თბილისო)	40 (10 | 10 | 10 | 10)	40 (10 | 10 | 10 | 10)	39 (10 | 9 | 10 | 10)	119
4	Soso Chachua (with Marita Khvedelidze)	"Gvinda gviq’vardes" (გვინდა გვიყვარდეს)	40 (10 | 10 | 10 | 10)	40 (10 | 10 | 10 | 10)	40 (10 | 10 | 10 | 10)	120
5	Anastasia Berishvili (with Mariam Bigvava)	"Mze itsinis" (მზე იცინის)	40 (10 | 10 | 10 | 10)	40 (10 | 10 | 10 | 10)	40 (10 | 10 | 10 | 10)	120

==== Round 2 ====
The shows of round 2 took place on 22 and 29 April. The candidates performed Georgian folk songs with the Shavnabada band. The jury members for this round were David Sakavaridze, Dato Evgenidze, and Maia Mikaberidze.

Show 3 – 22 April 2023
Draw	Artist	Song	Jury scores			Final score
Draw	Artist	Song	D. Sakavaridze	D. Evgenidze	M. Mikaberidze	Final score
1	Demetre Okriashvili	"Didebata" (დიდებათა)	39 (10 | 10 | 9 | 10)	38 (10 | 10 | 9 | 9)	40 (10 | 10 | 10 | 10)	117
2	Mariam Gomiashvili	"Chela" (ჩელა)	39 (10 | 9 | 10 | 10)	40 (10 | 10 | 10 | 10)	40 (10 | 10 | 10 | 10)	119
3	Anaroza Gaprindashvili	"Mindvrad dagich’er p’ep’elas" (მინდვრად დაგიჭერ პეპელას)	40 (10 | 10 | 10 | 10)	40 (10 | 10 | 10 | 10)	40 (10 | 10 | 10 | 10)	120
4	Datuna Kereselidze	"Maglonia" (მაგლონია)	40 (10 | 10 | 10 | 10)	40 (10 | 10 | 10 | 10)	40 (10 | 10 | 10 | 10)	120
5	Anastasia Vasadze	"Ach’aruli sakhumaro" (აჭარული სახუმარო)	40 (10 | 10 | 10 | 10)	40 (10 | 10 | 10 | 10)	40 (10 | 10 | 10 | 10)	120

Show 4 – 29 April 2023
Draw	Artist	Song	Jury scores			Final score
Draw	Artist	Song	D. Sakavaridze	D. Evgenidze	M. Mikaberidze	Final score
1	Anastasia Berishvili	"Kalakuri sat’rpialo" (ქალაქური სატრფიალო)	40 (10 | 10 | 10 | 10)	40 (10 | 10 | 10 | 10)	40 (10 | 10 | 10 | 10)	120
2	Soso Chachua	"K’uchkhi bednieri" (კუჩხი ბედნიერი)	40 (10 | 10 | 10 | 10)	40 (10 | 10 | 10 | 10)	40 (10 | 10 | 10 | 10)	120
3	Gabriel Lomsadze	"P’at’ara gogo" (პატარა გოგო)	40 (10 | 10 | 10 | 10)	40 (10 | 10 | 10 | 10)	40 (10 | 10 | 10 | 10)	120
4	Tamar Tomashvili	"Mts’irula" (მწირულა)	40 (10 | 10 | 10 | 10)	40 (10 | 10 | 10 | 10)	40 (10 | 10 | 10 | 10)	120
5	Anastasia Masurashvili	"Rach’uli suit’a" (რაჭული სუიტა)	40 (10 | 10 | 10 | 10)	40 (10 | 10 | 10 | 10)	40 (10 | 10 | 10 | 10)	120

==== Round 3 ====
The shows of round 3 took place on 6 and 13 May 2023. The candidates performed together with Zviad Bolkvadze. The jury members for this round were Nukri Kapanadze, Dato Evgenidze, and Sopo Khalvashi.

Show 5 – 6 May 2023
Draw	Artist	Song	Jury scores			Final score
Draw	Artist	Song	N. Kapanadze	D. Evgenidze	S. Khalvashi	Final score
1	Anaroza Gaprindashvili	"Sopeli" (სოფელი)	40 (10 | 10 | 10 | 10)	40 (10 | 10 | 10 | 10)	40 (10 | 10 | 10 | 10)	120
2	Datuna Kereselidze	"Modi gadavkandet bavshvobashi" (მოდი გადავქანდეთ ბავშვობაში)	40 (10 | 10 | 10 | 10)	40 (10 | 10 | 10 | 10)	40 (10 | 10 | 10 | 10)	120
3	Mariam Gomiashvili	"Movdena" (მოვდენა)	40 (10 | 10 | 10 | 10)	40 (10 | 10 | 10 | 10)	40 (10 | 10 | 10 | 10)	120
4	Demetre Okriashvili	"Datovlil nadzvebs" (დათოვლილ ნაძვებს)	40 (10 | 10 | 10 | 10)	40 (10 | 10 | 10 | 10)	40 (10 | 10 | 10 | 10)	120
5	Anastasia Vasadze	"Khorumi" (ხორუმი)	40 (10 | 10 | 10 | 10)	40 (10 | 10 | 10 | 10)	40 (10 | 10 | 10 | 10)	120

Show 6 – 13 May 2023
Draw	Artist	Song	Jury scores			Final score
Draw	Artist	Song	N. Kapanadze	D. Evgenidze	S. Khalvashi	Final score
1	Anastasia Berishvili	"Me shen dagikhat’av" (მე შენ დაგიხატავ)	40 (10 | 10 | 10 | 10)	40 (10 | 10 | 10 | 10)	40 (10 | 10 | 10 | 10)	120
2	Soso Chachua	"K’aruseli" (კარუსელი)	40 (10 | 10 | 10 | 10)	40 (10 | 10 | 10 | 10)	40 (10 | 10 | 10 | 10)	120
3	Tamar Tomashvili	"Bavshvobashi damrcha" (ბავშვობაში დამრჩა)	40 (10 | 10 | 10 | 10)	40 (10 | 10 | 10 | 10)	40 (10 | 10 | 10 | 10)	120
4	Anastasia Masurashvili	"Evel evel" (ეველ ეველ)	40 (10 | 10 | 10 | 10)	40 (10 | 10 | 10 | 10)	40 (10 | 10 | 10 | 10)	120
5	Gabriel Lomsadze	"Sakartvelos" (საქართველოს)	40 (10 | 10 | 10 | 10)	40 (10 | 10 | 10 | 10)	40 (10 | 10 | 10 | 10)	120

==== Round 4 ====
The shows of round 4 took place on 20 and 27 May 2023. The candidates performed songs in 10 different foreign languages, such as: Hebrew, French, Czech, Italian, African languages, Ukrainian, Spanish, English and Portuguese. The jury members for this round were Nodiko Tatishvili, Dato Evgenidze, and Tika Rukhadze.

Show 7 – 20 May 2023
Draw	Artist	Song	Jury scores			Final score
Draw	Artist	Song	N. Tatishvili	D. Evgenidze	T. Rukhadze	Final score
1	Datuna Kereselidze	"Mambo Italiano" (Rosemary Clooney)	40 (10 | 10 | 10 | 10)	40 (10 | 10 | 10 | 10)	39 (10 | 9 | 10 | 10)	119
2	Anastasia Vasadze	"Yerushalaim shel zahav" (Naomi Shemer)	40 (10 | 10 | 10 | 10)	40 (10 | 10 | 10 | 10)	40 (10 | 10 | 10 | 10)	120
3	Anaroza Gaprindashvili	"Paris sera toujours Paris" (Maurice Chevalier)	39 (10 | 9 | 10 | 10)	40 (10 | 10 | 10 | 10)	40 (10 | 10 | 10 | 10)	119
4	Demetre Okriashvili	"Gde patki ptiachku shnize ma"	39 (10 | 9 | 10 | 10)	40 (10 | 10 | 10 | 10)	39 (10 | 9 | 10 | 10)	118
5	Mariam Gomiashvili	"Save Us"	39 (9 | 10 | 10 | 10)	40 (10 | 10 | 10 | 10)	39 (9 | 10 | 10 | 10)	118

Show 8 – 27 May 2023
Draw	Artist	Song	Jury scores			Final score
Draw	Artist	Song	N. Tatishvili	D. Evgenidze	T. Rukhadze	Final score
1	Anastasia Masurashvili	"Ridna maty moya" (Platon Majboroda)	39 (10 | 9 | 10 | 10)	40 (10 | 10 | 10 | 10)	38 (9 | 9 | 10 | 10)	117
2	Gabriel Lomsadze	"Perfidia" (Alberto Domínguez)	40 (10 | 10 | 10 | 10)	40 (10 | 10 | 10 | 10)	40 (10 | 10 | 10 | 10)	120
3	Soso Chachua	"All You Need Is Love" (The Beatles)	40 (10 | 10 | 10 | 10)	40 (10 | 10 | 10 | 10)	40 (10 | 10 | 10 | 10)	120
4	Tamar Tomashvili	"O Morro Não Tem Vez" (Pedrinho Rodrigues)	40 (10 | 10 | 10 | 10)	40 (10 | 10 | 10 | 10)	40 (10 | 10 | 10 | 10)	120
5	Anastasia Berishvili	"It Don't Mean a Thing" (Ivie Anderson)	40 (10 | 10 | 10 | 10)	40 (10 | 10 | 10 | 10)	40 (10 | 10 | 10 | 10)	120

===== Semi-final qualification =====
The five participants who collected the most points throughout the four tours will advance to the semi-final, with the artists advancing to the next round being announced following the tallying of the scores at the end of the last show of the fourth round. The semi-finalists are Anastasia Berishvili, Anastasia Vasadze, Gabriel Lomsadze, Tamar Tomashvili and Soso Chachua.

Semi-final qualification
Artist	Round 1	Round 2	Round 3	Round 4	Total	Result
Anaroza Gaprindashvili	118	120	120	119	477	Eliminated
Anastasia Berishvili	120	120	120	120	480	Semi-finalist
Anastasia Vasadze	120	120	120	120	480	Semi-finalist
Anastasia Masurashvili	120	120	120	117	477	Eliminated
Gabriel Lomsadze	119	120	120	120	479	Semi-finalist
Datuna Kereselidze	117	120	120	119	476	Eliminated
Demetre Okriashvili	118	117	120	118	473	Eliminated
Tamar Tomashvili	120	120	120	120	480	Semi-finalist
Mariam Gomiashvili	115	119	120	118	472	Eliminated
Soso Chachua	120	120	120	120	480	Semi-finalist

==== Semi-final ====
The semi-final took place on 3 June 2023. The five contestants performed together with former Ranina participants, such as: Nikoloz Vasadze (2018), Anastasia Garsevanishvili (2019), Barbare Makhatadze (2021), Kato Chkareuli (2022) and last year winner Mariam Bigvava. The jury members for the semi-final were Buka Kartozia, Nato Metonidze and Sopo Toroshelidze.

All semi-finalists moved on to the final, due to a tie in the judges's vote. This meant that Ranina would have 5 finalists for the first time.

Semi-final – 3 June 2023
Draw	Artist	Song
1	Tamar Tomashvili	"Simghera tbilisdze" (სიმღერა თბილისზე)
2	Gabriel Lomsadze	"Meedzovis simghera" (მეეზოვის სიმღერა)
3	Anastasia Vasadze	"Lachini" (ლაჩინი)
4	Soso Chachua	"Somkhuri shalakho" (სომხური შალახო)
5	Anastasia Berishvili	"Sach’idao" (საჭიდაო)

==== Final ====
The final took place on 10 June 2023. The jury members for the semi-final were Davit Tsintsadze, Nato Metonidze and Sopo Toroshelidze.

At the end of the show Anastasia Vasadze was announced as the winner of the sixth season.

Final – 10 June 2023
Draw	Artist	Song
1	Anastasia Berishvili	"Chems simgheras vin gaigebs" (ჩემს სიმღერას ვინ გაიგებს)
2	Soso Chachua	"Janaia" (ჯანაია)
3	Tamar Tomashvili	"Isev is baghi" (ისევ ის ბაღი)
4	Gabriel Lomsadze	"Mukhambadzi" (მუხამბაზი)
5	Anastasia Vasadze	"Ram shemkmna adaminad" (რამ შემქმნა ადამიანად)

=== Preparation ===
Despite Anastasia Vasadze being the sole winner of Ranina 2023, therefore winning the right to represent Georgia in the Junior Eurovision Song Contest, it was revealed on 12 September 2023 that she would be supported on stage by Nikoloz Kharati and Oto Bazerashvili, both of whom participated in the 2022 edition of the selection and reached the final. This also marked the first time that Georgia would not be represented by a soloist since 2015.

The trio went on to rebrand as Anastasia and Ranina, referencing the name of the selection show which brought them together, on 13 October, with their song "Over the Sky", written by Betkho and Mebo Nutsubidze, being released on 15 October during the broadcast of Am shabat-k’viras (Georgian: ამ შაბათ-კ'ვირას, transl. This Weekend) on the First Channel.

== At Junior Eurovision ==
The Junior Eurovision Song Contest 2023 took place at Palais Nikaïa in Nice, France on 26 November 2023.

=== Voting ===
The same voting system that was introduced in the 2017 edition was used, where the results were determined by 50% online voting and 50% jury voting. Every participating broadcaster assembled a national jury that consisted of three music industry professionals and two children aged between 10 and 15 who were citizens of the country they represented. The rankings of those jurors were combined to make an overall top ten.

The online voting consisted of two phases. The first phase of the online voting began on 24 November 2023 when a recap of all the rehearsal performances was shown on the contest's website Junioreurovision.tv before the viewers could vote. After this, voters also had the option to watch longer one-minute clips from each participant's rehearsal. This first round of voting ended on 26 November at 15:59 CET. The second phase of the online voting took place during the live show and began right after the last performance and was open for 15 minutes. International viewers were able to vote for three songs. They were also able to vote for their own country's song. These votes were then turned into points which were determined by the percentage of votes received. For example, if a song received 10% of the votes, it received 10% of the available points.

At the end of the show, Georgia received 21 points from juries and 53 points from online voting, placing 14th. This equalled Georgia's lowest placement in the contest in 2019.

Points awarded to Georgia
Score	Country
12 points	
10 points	
8 points	
7 points	
6 points	
5 points	Portugal; Spain
4 points	Armenia
3 points	Italy; United Kingdom
2 points	
1 point	Germany
Georgia received 53 points from the online vote

Points awarded by Georgia
Score	Country
12 points	Spain
10 points	Armenia
8 points	Italy
7 points	Germany
6 points	Ukraine
5 points	France
4 points	Albania
3 points	Ireland
2 points	Portugal
1 point	Estonia

==== Detailed voting results ====
The following members comprised the Georgian jury:

- Anri Jokhadze – singer, represented Georgia in the Eurovision Song Contest 2012
- Davit Archvadze
- Nestan Sinjikashvili
- Lizi Kvirkvelia
- Sandra Gadelia – singer, represented Georgia in the Junior Eurovision Song Contest 2020

Detailed voting results from Georgia
Draw	Country	Juror A	Juror B	Juror C	Juror D	Juror E	Rank	Points
01	Spain	9	2	1	1	1	1	12
02	Malta	8	9	13	10	14	12	
03	Ukraine	5	5	3	5	11	5	6
04	Ireland	15	10	4	14	4	8	3
05	United Kingdom	14	14	9	7	8	11	
06	North Macedonia	11	15	10	8	10	14	
07	Estonia	12	4	11	13	13	10	1
08	Armenia	3	1	8	2	2	2	10
09	Poland	10	13	12	9	9	15	
10	Georgia							
11	Portugal	13	6	14	11	6	9	2
12	France	4	8	7	12	7	6	5
13	Albania	6	11	5	6	12	7	4
14	Italy	1	12	2	3	3	3	8
15	Germany	2	3	6	4	5	4	7
16	Netherlands	7	7	15	15	15	13	
