= Germany in the Junior Eurovision Song Contest 2023 =

- Junior Eurovision Song Contest 2023
- Country: Germany
- Selection process: National final
- Selection date: 18 September 2023

Competing entry
- Song: "Ohne Worte"
- Artist: Fia
- Songwriters: David Jürgens; Martin Fliegenschmidt; Sascha Seelemann

Placement
- Final result: 9th, 107 points

Participation chronology

Germany was represented at the Junior Eurovision Song Contest 2023 in France, which was held on 26 November 2023 in Nice. National television station Kika was responsible for the participation and selected the nation's entrant via national selection, won by Fia with the song "Ohne Worte".

The song was notable for being the first time a Junior Eurovision participant performed in sign language as well as vocals.

== Background ==
Germany announced on 8 July 2020 that it would debut in the 2020 contest held in Warsaw, Poland. Children's station Kika, a joint venture of the German national broadcasters ARD and ZDF, broadcasts the event within Germany and organises the selection of the nation's entry. Their most recent entry before the 2023 contest was Pauline and her song "Imagine Us", who placed 17th with 61 points in the 2021 contest.

In 2022, the country chose not to participate and instead took a "creative break" due to partial travel warnings for host country Armenia issued by the Federal Foreign Office. Kika still broadcast the show and expressed interest in returning to the 2023 competition. The German broadcaster confirmed on 25 May 2023 that they would take part and, for the first time, select the German representative internally. However, in early August it was reported that more details regarding the country's participation would be revealed at the end of the month, and on 23 August it was revealed that a national final with 5 acts approached by the public broadcaster NDR would be held in September to select the German act for the contest instead.

== Before Junior Eurovision ==
=== National final ===
The German entry for the Junior Eurovision Song Contest 2023 was selected through a national final. The participants and one-minute excerpts of the demo versions of their songs were revealed on 8 September with a voting platform launching immediately afterwards, where viewers from Germany, Austria and Switzerland could cast their votes until 17 September. Following the combination of the results of the online voting (50%) and an international expert jury (50%), German child singer of Chinese descent Fia was announced as the winner of the selection on 18 September. The international jury consisted of singers Kelvin Jones, Tom Gregory and Christopher, as well as other, unnamed members from France, Germany, Poland, Portugal and the United Kingdom.

Artist	Song	Jury	Online voting	Place
Adriano	"Be My Girl"	5th	3rd	4
Fia	"Ohne Worte"	1st	1st	1
Lenny	"Lieben lernen"	4th	5th	5
Rahel	"Believe"	3rd	2nd	2
Toby	"Stand Up"	2nd	4th	3

=== Preparation ===
The full version of "Ohne Worte" was recorded following the national final. The song is about how Fia communicates with her deaf sister (the title meaning "without words" in English), and in both the live performance and the accompanying music video she performs it simultaneously in German and Signed German. The song was released on 13 October, together with an accompanying music video, in which Fia is accompanied by deaf performer and model Liliana Schneider.

An open call searching for a dancer to symbolise Fia's sister in the live performance was opened by the NT Dance Agency and was won by Veronika, who specialises in contemporary and commercial dance.

== At Junior Eurovision ==
The Junior Eurovision Song Contest 2023 took place at Palais Nikaïa in Nice, France on 26 November 2023.

=== Voting ===
The same voting system that was introduced in the 2017 edition was used, where the results were determined by 50% online voting and 50% jury voting. Every participating broadcaster assembled a national jury that consisted of three music industry professionals and two children aged between 10 and 15 who were citizens of the country they represented. The rankings of those jurors were combined to make an overall top ten.

The online voting consisted of two phases. The first phase of the online voting began on 24 November 2023 when a recap of all the rehearsal performances was shown on the contest's website Junioreurovision.tv before the viewers could vote. After this, voters also had the option to watch longer one-minute clips from each participant's rehearsal. This first round of voting ended on 26 November at 15:59 CET. The second phase of the online voting took place during the live show and began right after the last performance and was open for 15 minutes. International viewers were able to vote for three songs. They were also able to vote for their own country's song. These votes were then turned into points which were determined by the percentage of votes received. For example, if a song received 10% of the votes, it received 10% of the available points.

At the end of the show, Germany received 33 points from juries and 74 points from online voting, placing 9th. This was Germany's best result in the contest to date.

Points awarded to Germany
Score	Country
12 points	
10 points	
8 points	
7 points	Estonia; Georgia
6 points	
5 points	
4 points	Netherlands; North Macedonia; Ukraine
3 points	Armenia
2 points	Albania
1 point	Italy; Malta
Germany received 74 points from the online vote

Points awarded by Germany
Score	Country
12 points	Armenia
10 points	Spain
8 points	France
7 points	Ukraine
6 points	Poland
5 points	United Kingdom
4 points	North Macedonia
3 points	Netherlands
2 points	Malta
1 point	Georgia

==== Detailed voting results ====
The following members comprised the German jury:

- Alex Christensen – represented Germany in the Eurovision Song Contest 2009
- João Joel Fischbach
- Janin Ullmann – green room host of the 2014 and 2015 German national finals for the Eurovision Song Contest
- Hannah June Ehlert
- Malou Beling – singer-songwriter

Detailed voting results from Germany
Draw	Country	Juror A	Juror B	Juror C	Juror D	Juror E	Rank	Points
01	Spain	2	4	2	3	5	2	10
02	Malta	7	3	8	14	15	9	2
03	Ukraine	4	7	1	4	9	4	7
04	Ireland	10	12	12	9	13	14	
05	United Kingdom	11	5	13	1	6	6	5
06	North Macedonia	13	6	7	10	2	7	4
07	Estonia	6	13	6	15	14	11	
08	Armenia	1	2	4	2	3	1	12
09	Poland	5	1	10	6	11	5	6
10	Georgia	12	8	14	10	4	10	1
11	Portugal	14	10	9	12	12	15	
12	France	3	9	3	7	1	3	8
13	Albania	9	14	11	11	8	12	
14	Italy	8	15	15	8	10	13	
15	Germany							
16	Netherlands	15	11	5	5	7	8	3
