= Malta in the Junior Eurovision Song Contest 2023 =

- Junior Eurovision Song Contest 2023
- Participating broadcaster: Public Broadcasting Services (PBS)
- Country: Malta
- Selection process: Artist: Malta Junior Eurovision Song Contest 2023; Song: Internal selection
- Selection date: Artist: 12 August 2023; Song: 16 October 2023

Competing entry
- Song: "Stronger"
- Artist: Yulan
- Songwriters: Elise Hedengren; Isak Alvedahl; John-Emil Johansson; Sandra Wikström; Yulan

Placement
- Final result: 10th, 94 points

Participation chronology

Malta was represented at the Junior Eurovision Song Contest 2023 with the song "Stronger", written by Elise Hedengren, Isak Alvedahl, John-Emil Johansson, Sandra Wikström, and Yulan, and performed by Yulan. The Maltese participating broadcaster, Public Broadcasting Services (PBS), organised a national final to select Yulan as the Maltese entrant, with her song "Stronger" being chosen internally.

== Background ==
Prior to the 2023 contest, Public Broadcasting Services (PBS) had participated in the Junior Eurovision Song Contest representing Malta seventeen times since its first participation in the inaugural 2003 contest. Malta participated in every contest, with the exception of the 2011 and 2012 contests. Malta has won the contest twice: in 2013 with "The Start" performed by Gaia Cauchi, and in 2015 with "Not My Soul" performed by Destiny Chukunyere. In the 2022 contest, Malta was represented by the song "Diamonds in the Skies" performed by Gaia Gambuzza. The song placed last with 43 points.

== Before Junior Eurovision ==
=== Malta Junior Eurovision Song Contest 2023 ===
PBS confirmed its participation in the contest in May 2023. The broadcaster organised the national final Malta Junior Eurovision Song Contest 2023 to select the Maltese entrant. Unlike the previous editions, the Malta Junior Eurovision Song Contest 2023 selected an artist to represent Malta exclusively, with the song chosen afterwards. Artists were able to submit two covers version songs which showcase their singing abilities between 21 May 2023 and 16 June 2023, and the 24 semi-finalists were revealed on 3 July 2023 following a preliminary selection by a jury nominated by PBS.

==== Semi-finals ====
The semi-finals were broadcast on 22 and 29 July 2023, hosted by Ryan and Josmar. The allocation for the semi-finals was announced on 7 July 2023. The 12 finalists were announced on 5 August. The announcement took place as part of a special broadcast, during which a recap of all competing acts was played and the finalists were selected by the votes of a five-member jury panel (80%) and public televoting (20%).

Semi-final 1 – 22 July 2023
R/O	Artist	Song (Original artist)	Result
1	Emilie Vella	"Control" (Zoe Wees)	—N/a
2	Mia Lanzon	"Crazy" (Gnarls Barkley)	—N/a
3	Point Blank	"From Now On" (Hugh Jackman)	Advanced
4	Keira Farrugia	"I Know Where I've Been" (Queen Latifah)	Advanced
5	Emma Farrugia	"Holding Out For a Hero" (Bonnie Tyler)	Advanced
6	Isis Jade Miller	"Wings" (Little Mix)	—N/a
7	Aaliyah Grech	"Rise" (Katy Perry)	Advanced
8	Dawn Desira	"Who's Loving You?" (The Miracles)	Advanced
9	Geneve Dimech	"Hurt" (Christina Aguilera)	—N/a
10	Shyann Cutajar	"Dancing with Your Ghost" (Sasha Alex Sloan)	Advanced
11	Ella Seychell Navarro	"Until I Found You" (Stephen Sanchez)	—N/a
12	Cesca Galea	"Something's Got a Hold on Me" (Etta James)	Advanced

Semi-final 2 – 29 July 2023
R/O	Artist	Song (Original artist)	Result
1	Anneka Xerri	"Lost On You" (LP)	Advanced
2	Naomi Camilleri	"Flowers" (Miley Cyrus)	—N/a
3	Krista Chircop	"Remember" (Becky Hill and David Guetta)	—N/a
4	Zoya Failla	"Something's Got a Hold On Me" (Etta James)	—N/a
5	Maria Curmi	"Feeling Good" (Nina Simone)	—N/a
6	Chanel Mifsud	"All I Want" (Olivia Rodrigo)	—N/a
7	Kaylyn Mallia	"Feeling Good" (Nina Simone)	Advanced
8	Yulan Law	"Hold My Hand" (Lady Gaga)	Advanced
9	Daylin Cassar Randich	"And I Am Telling You" (Jennifer Holliday)	Advanced
10	Jade Schembri	"All I Want" (Olivia Rodrigo)	—N/a
11	Marcus Mifsud	"Before You" (Benson Boone)	—N/a
12	Andrea Camilleri	"Somebody To Love" (Jefferson Airplane)	Advanced

==== Final ====
The final took take place on 12 August 2023, hosted by Ryan and Josmar. The show featured pre-recorded performances by the finalists and a live results reveal segment after the votes had been counted. The winner was selected by the votes of a jury panel (80%) and public televoting (20%). The jury consisted of Maltese Eurovision Song Contest 2017 entrant Claudia Faniello and Malta Eurovision Song Contest 2023 finalists Matt Black and Ryan Hili. The interval act featured last years winner Gaia Gambuzza, who performed her song "Diamonds in the Skies". Yulan Law was announced as the winner of the national final. Law had already attempted to represent the country thrice in the past, and has also been a finalist on the Maltese versions of The Voice Kids and Got Talent.

Final – 12 August 2023
R/O	Artist	Song	Place
1	Point Blank	"Born This Way" (Lady Gaga)	—N/a
2	Yulan Law	"Reflection" (Christina Aguilera)	1
3	Kaylyn Mallia	"Tattoo" (Loreen)	—N/a
4	Aaliyah Grech	"Mamma Knows Best" (Jessie J)	—N/a
5	Anneka Xerri	"Can't Hold Us" (Macklemore and Ryan Lewis)	—N/a
6	Shyann Cutajar	"Unstoppable" (Sia)	—N/a
7	Daylin Cassar Randich	"Remember" (Becky Hill and David Guetta)	2
8	Cesca Galea	"Trustfall" (P!nk)	—N/a
9	Emma Farrugia	"Unicorn" (Noa Kirel)	—N/a
10	Keira Farrugia	"Knock On Wood" (Amii Stewart)	—N/a
11	Andrea Camilleri	"Bridges" (Alika)	—N/a
12	Dawn Desira	"Crazy in Love" (Beyoncé)	3

== At Junior Eurovision ==
The Junior Eurovision Song Contest 2023 took place at Palais Nikaïa in Nice, France on 26 November 2023.

=== Voting ===
The same voting system that was introduced in the 2017 edition was used, where the results were determined by 50% online voting and 50% jury voting. Every participating broadcaster assembled a national jury that consisted of three music industry professionals and two children aged between 10 and 15 who were citizens of the country they represented. The rankings of those jurors were combined to make an overall top ten.

The online voting consisted of two phases. The first phase of the online voting began on 24 November 2023 when a recap of all the rehearsal performances was shown on the contest's website Junioreurovision.tv before the viewers could vote. After this, voters also had the option to watch longer one-minute clips from each participant's rehearsal. This first round of voting ended on 26 November at 15:59 CET. The second phase of the online voting took place during the live show and began right after the last performance and was open for 15 minutes. International viewers were able to vote for three songs. They were also able to vote for their own country's song. These votes were then turned into points which were determined by the percentage of votes received. For example, if a song received 10% of the votes, it received 10% of the available points.

At the end of the show, Malta received 51 points from juries and 43 points from online voting, placing 10th.

Points awarded to Malta
Score	Country
12 points	Armenia
10 points	France
8 points	
7 points	Portugal
6 points	Italy
5 points	
4 points	Albania; United Kingdom
3 points	Poland; Ukraine
2 points	Germany
1 point	
Malta received 43 points from the online vote

Points awarded by Malta
Score	Country
12 points	Armenia
10 points	United Kingdom
8 points	France
7 points	Netherlands
6 points	Spain
5 points	Portugal
4 points	Poland
3 points	Italy
2 points	North Macedonia
1 point	Germany

==== Detailed voting results ====
The following members comprised the Maltese jury:

- Arthur Caruana
- Daylin Cassar Randich
- Matthew Caruana
- Ryan Hili
- Anneka Xerri

Detailed voting results from Malta
Draw	Country	Juror A	Juror B	Juror C	Juror D	Juror E	Rank	Points
01	Spain	2	8	5	4	6	5	6
02	Malta							
03	Ukraine	12	10	10	10	11	13	
04	Ireland	13	14	14	13	9	14	
05	United Kingdom	3	1	4	3	4	2	10
06	North Macedonia	14	6	8	9	7	9	2
07	Estonia	15	11	7	11	8	11	
08	Armenia	7	3	1	1	1	1	12
09	Poland	9	5	9	6	12	7	4
10	Georgia	10	7	12	12	10	12	
11	Portugal	8	13	11	5	3	6	5
12	France	6	4	2	2	2	3	8
13	Albania	11	15	15	15	15	15	
14	Italy	4	9	13	7	13	8	3
15	Germany	5	12	6	14	14	10	1
16	Netherlands	1	2	3	8	5	4	7
