= United Kingdom in the Junior Eurovision Song Contest 2023 =

- Junior Eurovision Song Contest 2023
- Participating broadcaster: British Broadcasting Corporation (BBC)
- Country: United Kingdom
- Selection process: Internal selection
- Announcement date: 19 October 2023

Competing entry
- Song: "Back to Life"
- Artist: Stand Uniqu3
- Songwriters: Sky Adams; Jakke Erixson; Jack Hawitt

Placement
- Final result: 4th, 160 points

Participation chronology

The United Kingdom was represented at the Junior Eurovision Song Contest 2023, with the song "Back to Life", written by Sky Adams, Jakke Erixson, and Jack Hawitt, and performed by Stand Uniqu3. The British participating broadcaster, the British Broadcasting Corporation (BBC), internally selected its entry for the contest.

The group performed fifth in the running order, following the entry from Ireland and preceding the entry from North Macedonia. The United Kingdom finished in fourth position with 160 points, the nation's highest placing since 2004.

== Background ==
Prior to the 2023 contest, the United Kingdom had participated in the Junior Eurovision Song Contest four times since its first entry in the inaugural contest in 2003. Their best result was in 2004 when they finished in second position with the song "The Best is Yet to Come", performed by Cory Spedding. The United Kingdom was due to host the event in Manchester in 2004, but pulled out due to financial and scheduling issues. In the 2005 contest, Joni Fuller represented the country in Hasselt, Belgium, with the song "How Does It Feel?". The song ended 14th out of 16 entries with 28 points.

ITV, the participating broadcaster in the first three British participations, withdrew from the contest in 2006, after poor viewing figures in 2004 and 2005. Wales took part independently in the 2018 and 2019 contests. On 25 August 2022, it was confirmed that the UK would return for the 2022 contest in Yerevan, with the British Broadcasting Corporation (BBC) replacing ITV as the participating broadcaster. Freya Skye represented the United Kingdom in that contest with the song "Lose my Head". This came 5th out of 16 countries with 146 points, and won the online vote with 80 points.

== Before Junior Eurovision ==
On 29 August 2023, the BBC confirmed its participation in the 2023 contest and announced that the selection process for the song and artist was underway. Following local auditioning across the United Kingdom a second round of auditions commenced in London held by the British Junior Eurovision delegation in August 2023, headed by Lee Smithurst. The final day of auditions took place on 31 August 2023, with the song recording process taking place at the Metropolis Studios in September 2023. On 19 October 2023, it was revealed that the United Kingdom would be represented by Stand Uniqu3, the first non-solo act selected to represent the UK at Junior Eurovision. The group consisted of members Maisie, Yazmin and Hayla, and formed especially for Junior Eurovision. All three members of the group had previously appeared on the seventh series of The Voice Kids. The selected song, "Back to Life", was released on the same day, coinciding with the BBC's artist announcement. The song was written by Sky Adams, Jakke Erixson and Jack Hawitt, the latter of whom was also a songwriter for "Lose My Head", the British entry in 2022.

"The Junior Eurovision Song Contest was a real spectacle and success for us last year and we’re very happy that we have a new calendar moment for fans of Eurovision and a brand new girl group for audiences to get behind. We have a great song and high hopes for our brilliant trio, Stand Uniqu3, and we want families everywhere to cheer on Hayla, Maisie and Yazmin and watch them represent the UK in the competition across BBC Two, CBBC and iPlayer."

— Patricia Hidalgo Reina

=== Preparation and promotion ===
Following the reveal of the UK entry, Stand Uniqu3 embarked on several promotional activities, appearing on BBC Breakfast and The Zoe Ball Breakfast Show on BBC Radio 2 on 19 October. They also appeared on CBBC’s Newsround. On 4 November, they gave their first lip sync performance of "Back to Life" on the CBBC children's television programme Blue Peter. On 11 November, the trio performed on CBBC's Saturday Mash-Up! and four days later on BBC Two's Strictly Come Dancing: It Takes Two. On 17 November, Stand Uniqu3 gave a live TV performance of their entry on the BBC's annual charity appeal show Children in Need.

On 24 November 2023, CBBC broadcast a 30-minute documentary: Stand Uniqu3's Road To Eurovision, which followed the group's journey to the contest.

== At Junior Eurovision ==
The Junior Eurovision Song Contest 2023 took place at Palais Nikaïa in Nice, France on 26 November 2023. The event was broadcast live on CBBC, BBC Two and on the BBC iPlayer. The BBC also confirmed that children's TV presenter Lauren Layfield and singer Hrvy would return as commentators for the second year running.

Stand Uniqu3 and the UK delegation also participated in the Opening Ceremony for the contest, which was held in Hotel Negresco in Nice on 20 November 2023, during which the running order was also determined. The United Kingdom was drawn by the show producers to perform in position 5, following the entry from Ireland and preceding the entry from North Macedonia.

=== Performance ===
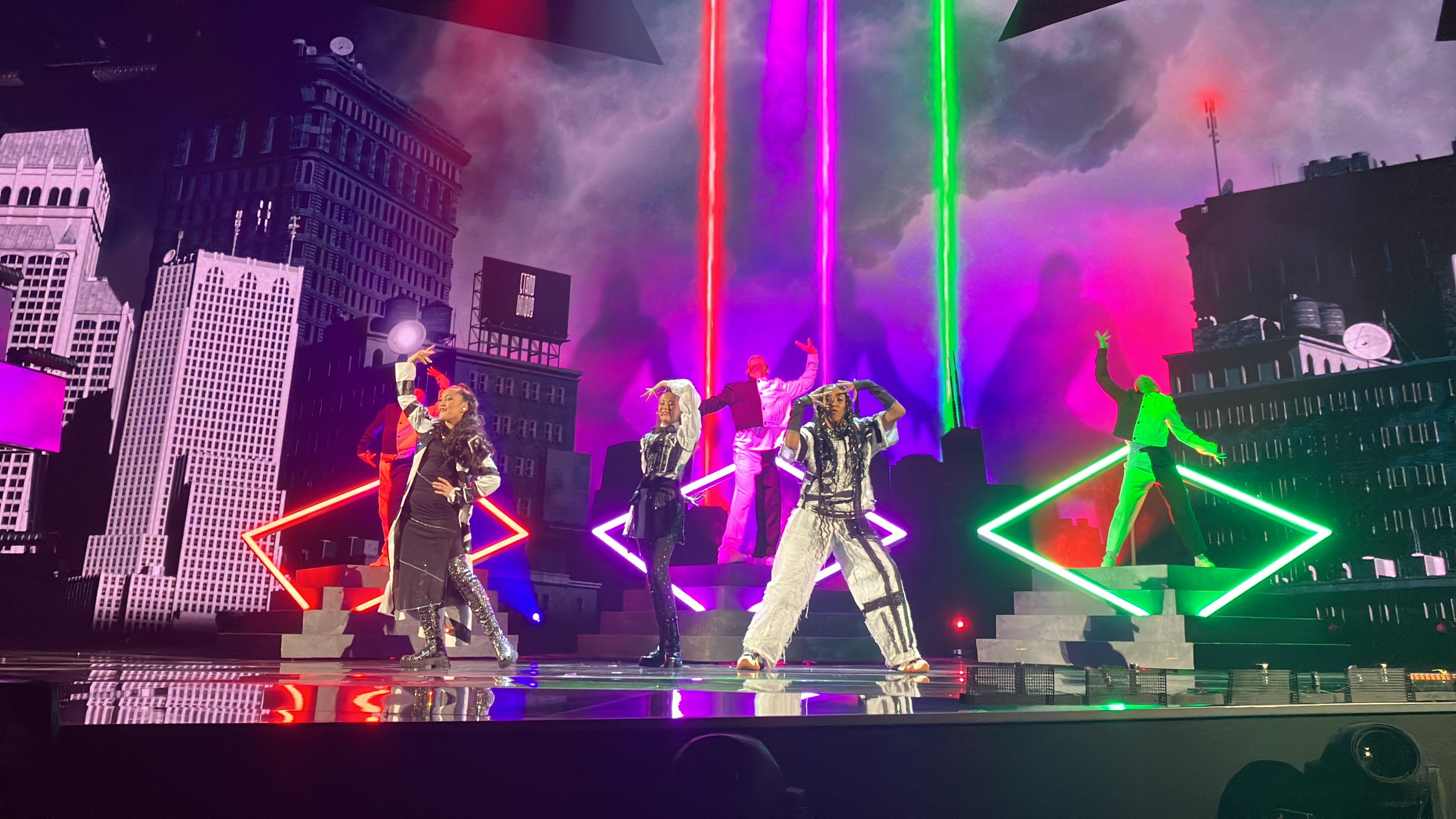
Stand Uniqu3 performing during the jury show

The live performance for the UK entry in Nice featured similarities to the music video for the song, with the three members of Stand Uniqu3 beginning the performance on an individual platform with statuesque breaks corresponding with each member's verse. The group were also joined by three backing dancers who joined towards the end of the song, with the backing LED's serving as a cityscape, which the UK delegation likened to superheroes waiting for the call to action. LED diamonds also lit up and interacted with the backing graphics as the performance progressed.

Dan Shipton, who had designed several previous Eurovision stagings, including for Sam Ryder, the British runner-up for the United Kingdom in the Eurovision Song Contest 2022, was again the creative director, while Kieran Daley-Ward was the lead choreographer and Jorge Antonio was the costume designer for the performance. Juliet Russell served as vocal coach for the group, both for the performance in Nice and the original recording of "Back To Life".

=== Voting ===
The same voting system that was introduced in the 2017 edition was used, where the results were determined by 50% online voting and 50% jury voting. Every participating broadcaster assembled a national jury that consisted of three music industry professionals and two children aged between 10 and 15 who were citizens of the country they represented. The rankings of those jurors were combined to make an overall top ten.

The online voting consisted of two phases. The first phase of the online voting began on 24 November 2023 when a recap of all the rehearsal performances was shown on the contest's website Junioreurovision.tv before the viewers could vote. After this, voters also had the option to watch longer one-minute clips from each participant's rehearsal. This first round of voting ended on 26 November at 15:59 CET. The second phase of the online voting took place during the live show and began right after the last performance and was open for 15 minutes. International viewers were able to vote for three songs. They were also able to vote for their own country's song. These votes were then turned into points which were determined by the percentage of votes received. For example, if a song received 10% of the votes, it received 10% of the available points.

The United Kingdom received 102 points from the professional juries, placing in fourth position. The country placed seventh in the online vote, with 58 points. Overall, the United Kingdom placed in fourth place with 160 points, receiving maximum twelve points from Albania and Ukraine in the jury vote. This marked the best British result in the Junior Eurovision Song Contest since 2004.

The top twelve point score of the British jury vote was awarded to Armenia.

Points awarded to the United Kingdom
| Score | Country |
|---|---|
| 12 points | Albania; Ukraine |
| 10 points | Malta; Spain |
| 8 points | Armenia; Italy; Poland |
| 7 points | Netherlands; North Macedonia |
| 6 points | Estonia |
| 5 points | Germany |
| 4 points | France; Ireland |
| 3 points | |
| 2 points | |
| 1 point | Portugal |
The United Kingdom received 58 points from the online vote.

Points awarded by the United Kingdom
| Score | Country |
|---|---|
| 12 points | Armenia |
| 10 points | Poland |
| 8 points | Spain |
| 7 points | Albania |
| 6 points | France |
| 5 points | Netherlands |
| 4 points | Malta |
| 3 points | Georgia |
| 2 points | Estonia |
| 1 point | Ukraine |

==== Detailed voting results ====
Each nation's jury consisted of five members: three adult music industry professionals and two children, who are citizens of the country they represent. This jury judged each entry based on: vocal capacity; the stage performance; the song's composition and originality; and the overall impression by the act. In addition, no member of a national jury was permitted to be related in any way to any of the competing acts in such a way that they cannot vote impartially and independently. The individual rankings of each jury member were released shortly after the contest.

The following members comprised the British jury:

- Aaron Renfree – Former S Club Juniors member, choreographer
- Jamie Birkett – West End singer, actress
- Ngunan Adamu – Radio DJ, broadcaster
- Josh Caslin – Child star, opened Eurovision Song Contest 2023 in Liverpool
- Kristin-Leigh – Performer, backing dancer for Freya Skye in 2022

Detailed voting results from the United Kingdom
| Draw | Country | Juror A | Juror B | Juror C | Juror D | Juror E | Rank | Points |
|---|---|---|---|---|---|---|---|---|
| 01 | Spain | 10 | 6 | 5 | 3 | 2 | 3 | 8 |
| 02 | Malta | 3 | 7 | 2 | 10 | 8 | 7 | 4 |
| 03 | Ukraine | 5 | 8 | 10 | 14 | 15 | 10 | 1 |
| 04 | Ireland | 12 | 15 | 15 | 13 | 11 | 15 | |
| 05 | United Kingdom | | | | | | | |
| 06 | North Macedonia | 15 | 14 | 11 | 8 | 14 | 13 | |
| 07 | Estonia | 13 | 9 | 6 | 4 | 9 | 9 | 2 |
| 08 | Armenia | 1 | 1 | 7 | 1 | 6 | 1 | 12 |
| 09 | Poland | 8 | 3 | 3 | 2 | 1 | 2 | 10 |
| 10 | Georgia | 4 | 5 | 13 | 7 | 3 | 8 | 3 |
| 11 | Portugal | 11 | 11 | 12 | 12 | 7 | 11 | |
| 12 | France | 7 | 4 | 4 | 5 | 5 | 5 | 6 |
| 13 | Albania | 2 | 2 | 8 | 6 | 10 | 4 | 7 |
| 14 | Italy | 9 | 10 | 14 | 11 | 12 | 12 | |
| 15 | Germany | 14 | 13 | 9 | 15 | 13 | 14 | |
| 16 | Netherlands | 6 | 12 | 1 | 9 | 4 | 6 | 5 |
