= Palais Nikaïa =

Multi-purpose indoor facility in Nice, France

Palais Nikaia

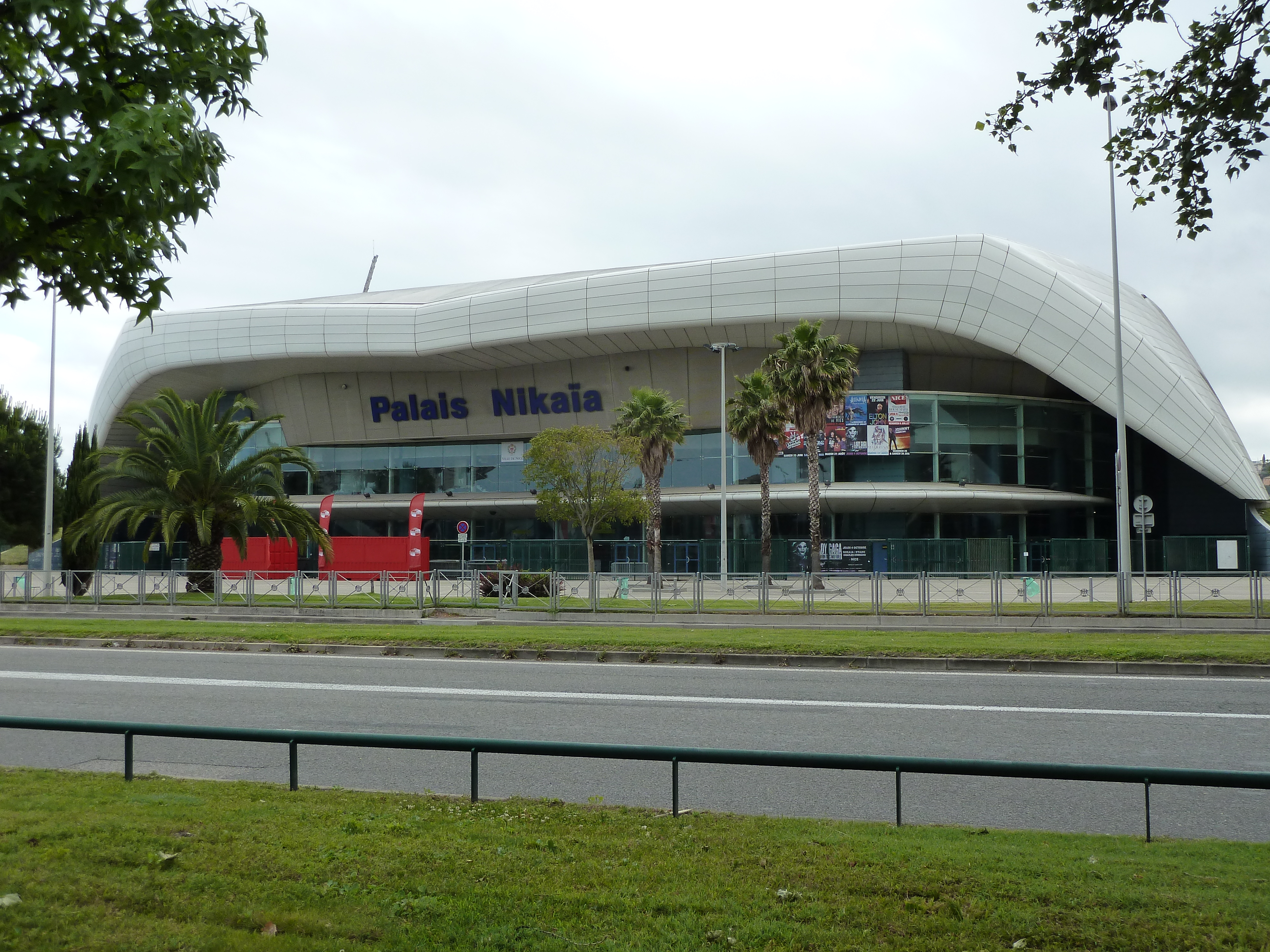
- Interactive map of Palais Nikaia
- Address: 163 Blvd du Mercantour
- Location: Nice, France
- Coordinates: 43°40′42″N 7°12′1.06″E
- Owner: Ville de Nice
- Operator: Vega Group and Live Nation
- Capacity: 6,250 seated 9,000 (with standing)

Construction
- Built: 2000–2001
- Opened: 1 April 2001
- Architects: Louis Chevalier; André Grésy; Serge Grésy

Website
- Official website

Palais Nikaïa (French pronunciation: [palɛ nikaja]) is an indoor concert hall and multi-purpose facility located in Nice, France. It opened on 4 April 2001, and is located at a five-minute drive from Côte d'Azur International Airport. The name Nikaïa derives from the ancient Greek settlement, predecessor of today's Nice. In addition to concerts, Palais Nikaïa can host variety shows, sporting events and conventions.

On its own, Palais Nikaïa has seats for between 1,500 and 6,250 persons depending upon configuration, with an upwards maximum of 9,000 capacity including those standing. However, in a unique arrangement, it is located next to the outdoor Stade Charles-Ehrmann, with sliding glass doors to operate between them, and the two in combination can be used to host very large concerts with up to 50,000 or more in attendance.

== History ==
Palais Nikaïa was built in 2000 and 2001 by the architects André Grésy and Serge Grésy, who had previously participated in the plans of the Zénith de Toulouse, as well as by Louis Chevalier. It was inaugurated on 4 April 2001 in the presence of Albert, Hereditary Prince of Monaco and Elton John. The latter then gave the first concert in the venue. From 2001 to 2009, the palace was managed by Gilbert Coullier and Denis Thominet via the Société d'animation du Palais Nikaïa. In June 2009, the municipality chose as its new delegate the Vega Group associated with the French subsidiary of the Live Nation group in an operating structure called Société d'exploitation du Palais Nikaïa, and 70% owned by Vega.

Following the death of Johnny Hallyday on 5 December 2017, two days later the Mayor of Nice Christian Estrosi proposed that the venue be renamed in Hallyday's honour. Finally, the municipal council decided that only the forecourt of the performance hall would be renamed with the name of the singer.

== Events ==
Depeche Mode performed at the venue on May 4, 2013, during their Delta Machine Tour, in front of a recording-breaking sold-out crowd of 9,904 people. The venue hosted the 2013 Jeux de la Francophonie which took place in Nice from 6 to 15 September 2013. The disciplines practiced in this venue were judo and freestyle wrestling.

The venue hosted the Junior Eurovision Song Contest 2023, which took place on 26 November 2023.

== See also ==
- List of indoor arenas in France
