= Estonia in the Junior Eurovision Song Contest =

- Junior Eurovision Song Contest
- Participating broadcaster: Eesti Rahvusringhääling (ERR)

Participation summary
- Appearances: 2
- First appearance: 2023
- Last appearance: 2024
- Highest placement: 14th: 2024
- Participation history: 2023; 2024; 2025 – 2026

External links
- ERR Eurovision website
- For the most recent participation see Estonia in the Junior Eurovision Song Contest 2024

Estonia has been represented at the Junior Eurovision Song Contest since the 2023 contest. The Estonian participating broadcaster in the contest is Eesti Rahvusringhääling (ERR). It selected Arhanna Sandra Arbma as the first Estonian representative for Junior Eurovision. Estonia finished in second-last place, scoring 49 points. Following a fourteenth place finish in 2024 with "Tänavad" by Annabelle, ERR withdrew from the 2025 contest due to budget cuts.

== History ==
=== Before participation ===
ERR broadcast the first two editions of the Junior Eurovision Song Contest in 2003 and 2004, but did not participate due to financial restraints. Broadcasters from the Baltic countries, including Estonia, expressed interest in taking part in the 2016 contest. This however did not materialise.

=== Tähtede lava ===
Tähtede lava (transl. "Star Stage") is an Estonian singing competition for young soloists. The competition first aired in 2019. The competition was used to select the representative of Estonia in 2024, and the winner of the second edition of the show was also selected to represent Estonia in 2023.

The first edition took place between March and May 2019, the winner overall was Glorija Ruadjärv – whom was also the winner of the "Middle–aged group." Meanwhile Sireli Salum won the "Older–aged group," and Arhanna Sandra Arbma won the "Younger–aged group." The second edition took place between January and February 2022, this time the "Age–groups" weren't used. Arhanna Sandra Arbma, returned to the competition and won the event, meanwhile Marten Thomas Tõniste won the audience category. The third edition aired from April and May 2024 and also included the return of "Age–groups." Oliver Rei won the "Younger–aged group," Steven Luik won the "Middle–aged group," and Annabelle Ats won the "Older–aged group." Annabelle Ats was also selected to represent Estonia at Junior Eurovision 2024.

=== Participation ===
On 29 August 2023, the European Broadcasting Union (EBU) published the list of participating countries in the 2023 contest, which included Estonia. On the same day, ERR announced that 11-year-old Arhanna Sandra Arbma would be Estonia's entrant. Her song, "Hoiame kokku" ("Let’s Stick Together"), written by Arhanna herself along with Karl-Ander Reismann, Leelo Tungal and Rael Laikre, was released on 16 October along with a music video. At the contest Arhanna finished 15th with 49 points.

On 24 November 2023, ahead of the country's debut, ERR said that it was considering the possibility of making the singing competition Tähtede lava its national final for Junior Eurovision. This was confirmed the following 4 May, ahead of the final of Tähtede lava. One day later, on 5 May 2024, Estonia selected Annabelle Ats as its entrant for the 2024 contest. At the 2024 contest, held on 16 November 2024 in Spain, she performed song "Tänavad". Receiving 55 points, she finished in 14th place.

On 11 December 2024, Estonian broadcaster ERR confirmed its withdrawal from the 2025 contest due to budget cuts.

== Participation overview ==
Year	Artist	Song	Language	Place	Points
2023	Arhanna	"Hoiame kokku"	Estonian, English	15	49
2024	Annabelle	"Tänavad"	Estonian	14	55

== Commentators and spokespersons ==
The Estonian broadcaster, ERR, sent their own commentator to each contest in order to provide commentary in Estonian and Russian. Spokespersons were also chosen by the national broadcaster in order to announce the awarding points from Estonia. The table below lists the details of each commentator and spokesperson since the country's debut in 2023.

Year	Channel(s)	Commentator	Spokesperson	Ref.
2003	ETV	Unknown	Did not participate	
2004	ETV	Unknown	Did not participate	
2005–2022	No broadcast		Did not participate	N/A
2023	ETV2, ETV+	Marko Reikop (ETV2); Aleksandr Hobotov and Julia Kalenda (ETV+)	Iris Ashton	
2024	ETV2, ETV+	Marko Reikop (ETV2); Aleksandr Hobotov and Julia Kalenda (ETV+)	Arhanna	
2025–2026	No broadcast		Did not participate	N/A

== See also ==
- Estonia in the Eurovision Song Contest
