= 107.1 FM =

FM radio frequency

The following radio stations broadcast on FM frequency 107.1 MHz:

== Argentina ==
- Astral in Capilla del Monte, Córdoba
- Azul in Río Primero, Córdoba
- City in Jujuy
- Cronos in Sastre, Santa Fe
- De La Paz in San Juan
- Disco in Esquel, Chubut
- Esperanza in Maquinista Savio, Buenos Aires
- GD Radio in Puán, Buenos Aires
- Los ángeles in Castelli, Chaco
- La Red Corrientes in Corrientes
- La voz de la amistad in General Cabrera, Córdoba
- Meridiano in Rosario, Santa Fe
- Patagonia in Realicó, La Pampa
- Plaza in Plaza Huincul, Neuquén
- Radio María in San Rafael, Mendoza
- Shalom in Mendoza
- Universal in Buenos Aires

== Austria ==
- Arabella Niederösterreich in Niederösterreich, Austria

== Australia ==
- 2AAA in Wagga Wagga, New South Wales
- 2KY in Coffs Harbour, New South Wales
- 2KY in Eden, New South Wales
- 5SSA in Adelaide, South Australia
- Triple J in Ballarat, Victoria

== Canada (Channel 296) ==
- CBIC-FM in Chéticamp, Nova Scotia
- CBSI-FM-21 in Blanc-Sablon, Quebec
- CFNL-FM in Sorrento, British Columbia
- CFNO-FM-2 in Hornepayne, Ontario
- CFNO-FM-5 in Longlac, Ontario
- CFNO-FM-7 in Nakina, Ontario
- CFPB-FM in Kugaaruk, Nunavut
- CFSM-FM-2 in Sparwood, British Columbia
- CHFL-FM in Fort Liard, Northwest Territories
- CHNC-FM in New-Carlisle, Quebec
- CIBM-FM in Riviere-du-Loup, Quebec
- CILQ-FM in Toronto, Ontario
- CISQ-FM in Squamish, British Columbia
- CJCR-FM in Clyde River, Nunavut
- CJCS-FM in Stratford, Ontario
- CJFI-FM in Moose Factory, Ontario
- CJHQ-FM in Nakusp, British Columbia
- CJIS-FM in Truro, Nova Scotia
- CJLP-FM in Disraeli, Quebec
- CJME-2-FM in Gravelbourg, Saskatchewan
- CJNW-FM in Edmonton, Alberta
- CJTN-FM in Quinte West, Ontario
- CJWA-FM in Wawa, Ontario
- CKAB-FM in Arctic Bay, Nunavut
- CKCL-FM in Winnipeg, Manitoba
- CKQC-FM in Abbotsford, British Columbia
- CKUA-FM-9 in Whitecourt, Alberta
- VF2021 in Kakisa, Northwest Territories
- VF2417 in Paulatuk, Northwest Territories
- VOAR-13-FM in Bridgewater, Nova Scotia

== China ==
- China Huayi Broadcast in Fuzhou and Putian
- CNR Business Radio in Chifeng and Guang'an
- CNR Music Radio in Xishuangbanna
- CNR The Voice of China in Yonghou
- CRI News Radio in Guangzhou, Zhongshan and Shenzhen

== Israel ==
- Galgalatz in Jerusalem

== Malaysia ==
- Kelantan FM in Eastern Kelantan
- Nasional FM in Kuantan, Pahang and Taiping, Perak
- Radio Klasik in Miri, Sarawak
- Suria in Johor Bahru, Johor and Singapore

== Mexico ==
- XHACN-FM in León, Guanajuato
- XHCGJ-FM in Ciudad Guzmán, Jalisco
- XHCLO-FM in Monclova, Coahuila
- XHDY-FM in Ciudad Morelos, Baja California
- XHETA-FM in Zitácuaro, Michoacán
- XHHTY-FM in Martínez de la Torre, Veracruz
- XHJAQ-FM in Jalpan de Serra, Querétaro
- XHPNS-FM in Piedras Negras, Coahuila
- XHSBE-FM in San Andrés Cholula, Puebla
- XHSCDW-FM in Arcelia, Guerrero
- XHSCFD-FM in Amatlán De Los Reyes-Cordoba, Veracruz
- XHTGAN-FM in Tangancícuaro, Michoacán
- XHVTH-FM in Matamoros, Tamaulipas

== New Zealand ==
- Various low-power stations up to 1 watt

== Philippines ==
- DWEE in San Fernando City, Pampanga
- DWFJ in Olongapo City
- DZLL-FM in Baguio City
- DWJS in Virac
- DWIR in Iriga City
- DYRQ in Masbate City
- DYEN in Bacolod City
- DYXC in Ormoc City
- DYPE in Toledo City
- XFM in Tagum City
- DXHD in Matanao, Davao del Sur
- DXYY in Kidapawan City
- Juander Radyo in Pagadian City
- DXYZ in Iligan City
- DXGG in Malaybalay City

== Taiwan ==
- Transfers China Huayi Broadcast in Matsu

== United Kingdom ==
- Raidió Fáilte in Belfast, Northern Ireland
- Capital Mid-Counties in Rugby, Warwickshire
- Capital Xtra in North London, England
- Greatest Hits Radio Black Country & Shropshire in Oswestry
- Greatest Hits Radio Harrogate & The Yorkshire Dales in Ilkley, Otley, Pateley Bridge and Skipton
- GTFM in Cynon Valley
- Nation Radio Wales in Pembrokeshire
- Hits Radio Cambridgeshire in Ely

== United States (Channel 296) ==
- KARX in Canyon, Texas
- KAUM in Colorado City, Texas
- KBHI in Miner, Missouri
- KBMV-FM in Birch Tree, Missouri
- KBNW-FM in Spokane, Washington
- KBPM-LP in Mesquite, Texas
- KCGW-LP in Edgar, Nebraska
- KCNY in Greenbrier, Arkansas
- KCWR in Bakersfield, California
- KDBX in Clear Lake, South Dakota
- KDRS-FM in Paragould, Arkansas
- KDSN-FM in Denison, Iowa
- KEGH in Woodruff, Utah
- KESR in Shasta Lake City, California
- KESS-FM in Benbrook, Texas
- KFCO in Bennett, Colorado
- KFNV-FM in Ferriday, Louisiana
- KHAV in Sabinal, Texas
- KHIT-FM in Madera, California
- KIPC-LP in Pendleton, Oregon
- KJML in Columbus, Kansas
- KKEQ in Fosston, Minnesota
- KLJH in Bayfield, Colorado
- KLJX-LP in Flagstaff, Arizona
- KLMZ in Leadwood, Missouri
- KLVU in Sweet Home, Oregon
- KLZT in Bastrop, Texas
- KMDS in Las Vegas, New Mexico
- KMGK in Glenwood, Minnesota
- KNID (FM) in North Enid, Oklahoma
- KNKK in Needles, California
- KYFV in Armijo, New Mexico
- KNWI in Osceola, Iowa
- KOFR-LP in Lander, Wyoming
- KOGD-LP in Shawnee, Oklahoma
- KOGM in Opelousas, Louisiana
- KOUJ-LP in Norman, Oklahoma
- KOYO-LP in Oroville, California
- KPTG-LP in Adelanto, California
- KPVW in Aspen, Colorado
- KQEO in Idaho Falls, Idaho
- KQIP-LP in Chico, California
- KRQN in Vinton, Iowa
- KRQT in Castle Rock, Washington
- KRVA-FM in Campbell, Texas
- KRXB in Beeville, Texas
- KSES-FM in Seaside, California
- KSFT-FM in South Sioux City, Nebraska
- KSIL in Rincon, New Mexico
- KSRT in Cloverdale, California
- KSSC in Ventura, California
- KSSD in Fallbrook, California
- KSSE in Arcadia, California
- KTFS-FM in Texarkana, Arkansas
- KTHI in Caldwell, Idaho
- KTHS-FM in Berryville, Arkansas
- KTMY in Coon Rapids, Minnesota
- KTUM in Tatum, New Mexico
- KVSG-LP in Twisp, Washington
- KVVA-FM in Apache Junction, Arizona
- KWHO in Lovell, Wyoming
- KWLV in Many, Louisiana
- KXHT in Marion, Arkansas
- KYEB-LP in Garland, Texas
- KYNZ in Lone Grove, Oklahoma
- WAFG-LP in Pompano Beach, Florida
- WAOA-FM in Melbourne, Florida
- WAVX-LP in Ormond Beach, Florida
- WBYP in Belzoni, Mississippi
- WCBC-FM in Keyser, West Virginia
- WCHG in Hot Springs, Virginia
- WCKC in Cadillac, Michigan
- WCKT in Lehigh Acres, Florida
- WCXP-LP in Chicago, Illinois
- WDOH in Delphos, Ohio
- WEAI (FM) in Lynnville, Illinois
- WEDJ in Danville, Indiana
- WEJP-LP in Wheeling, West Virginia
- WERZ in Exeter, New Hampshire
- WEVC in Gorham, New Hampshire
- WFHN in Fairhaven, Massachusetts
- WFON in Fond du Lac, Wisconsin
- WFXC in Durham, North Carolina
- WFXM in Gordon, Georgia
- WGMY in Thomasville, Georgia
- WHFV in Shenandoah, Virginia
- WHJB in Greensburg, Pennsylvania
- WHMD in Hammond, Louisiana
- WIRO in Ironton, Ohio
- WIRX in Saint Joseph, Michigan
- WITB-LP in Benton, Kentucky
- WJPS in Boonville, Indiana
- WKBE in Corinth, New York
- WKCB-FM in Hindman, Kentucky
- WKFS in Milford, Ohio
- WKRV in Vandalia, Illinois
- WKTW-LP in Lenhartsville, Pennsylvania
- WLAI in Danville, Kentucky
- WLBI-LP in Tomahawk, Wisconsin
- WLGF in Gulfport, Mississippi
- WLIH in Whitneyville, Pennsylvania
- WLIR-FM in Hampton Bays, New York
- WLJZ-LP in Salisbury, North Carolina
- WLNU-LP in Lenoir City, Tennessee
- WLRF in Greenville, Pennsylvania
- WLSM-FM in Louisville, Mississippi
- WLVZ in Collins, Mississippi
- WMNB-LP in North Adams, Massachusetts
- WNUS in Belpre, Ohio
- WOCO-FM in Oconto, Wisconsin
- WPGU in Urbana, Illinois
- WPSK-FM in Pulaski, Virginia
- WPVL-FM in Platteville, Wisconsin
- WQJU in Mifflintown, Pennsylvania
- WQKL in Ann Arbor, Michigan
- WRFK (FM) in Barre, Vermont
- WRFN-LP in Pasquo, Tennessee
- WRHM in Lancaster, South Carolina
- WRXZ in Briarcliff Acres, South Carolina
- WSAQ in Port Huron, Michigan
- WSGT in Patterson, Georgia
- WSPY-FM in Plano, Illinois
- WTDK in Federalsburg, Maryland
- WTJN-LP in Troy, Ohio
- WTKF in Atlantic, North Carolina
- WTLZ in Saginaw, Michigan
- WTSH-FM in Rockmart, Georgia
- WTTX-FM in Appomattox, Virginia
- WUHU in Smiths Grove, Kentucky
- WURN-FM in Key Largo, Florida
- WWFK in Dannemora, New York
- WWLG in Circleville, Ohio
- WWYY in Belvidere, New Jersey
- WWZY in Long Branch, New Jersey
- WXPK in Briarcliff Manor, New York
- WYFA in Waynesboro, Georgia
- WZLF in Bellows Falls, Vermont
- WZMO-LP in Marion, Ohio
- WZVN (FM) in Lowell, Indiana
