= WOCO =

WOCO may refer to:

- WOCO (AM), a radio station (1260 AM) licensed to Oconto, Wisconsin, United States
- WOCO-FM, a radio station (107.1 FM) licensed to Oconto, Wisconsin, United States
- WoCo, a works council is a shop-floor organization representing workers that functions as a local/firm-level complement to trade unions but is independent of these at least in some countries.
- UEFA Women's Championship, football competition contested by the senior women's national teams of the members of UEFA
