= WLJZ =

WLJZ may refer to:

- WLJZ-LP, a low-power radio station (107.1 FM) licensed to serve Salisbury, North Carolina, United States
- WSBX (FM), a radio station (94.5 FM) licensed to Mackinaw City, Michigan, United States which held the call sign WLJZ from 1995 to 2012
