= Junior Eurovision Song Contest 2016 =

International song competition for youth

- Embrace

Date and venue
- Final: 20 November 2016
- Venue: Mediterranean Conference Centre; Valletta, Malta

Organisation
- Organiser: European Broadcasting Union (EBU)
- Executive supervisor: Jon Ola Sand

Production
- Host broadcaster: Public Broadcasting Services (PBS)
- Director: Gordon Bonello
- Executive producer: Charles Dalli
- Presenters: Ben Camille; Valerie Vella

Participants
- Number of entries: 17
- Returning countries: Cyprus; Israel; Poland
- Non-returning countries: Montenegro; San Marino; Slovenia
- Participation map: Competing countries Countries that participated in the past but not in 2016

Vote
- Voting system: Each country's adult & kid juries, as well as three expert jurors, award 12, 10, 8–1 points to their top 10 songs.
- Winning song: Georgia "Mzeo"

The Junior Eurovision Song Contest 2016 was the fourteenth edition of the Junior Eurovision Song Contest, held on 20 November 2016 at the Mediterranean Conference Centre, in Valletta, Malta, and presented by Ben Camille and Valerie Vella. It was organised by the European Broadcasting Union (EBU) and host broadcaster Public Broadcasting Services (PBS). This was the second time that the contest was hosted in Malta, its first being in 2014. Jon Ola Sand was appointed as the Executive Supervisor for the Junior Eurovision Song Contest 2016, following the dismissal of the former supervisor, Vladislav Yakovlev.

Broadcasters from seventeen countries participated in the contest with Montenegro and Slovenia both withdrawing from the competition after two contests, and San Marino withdrawing after three, whilst Cyprus returned after a one-year break, Israel returned after a three-year break and Poland returned to the contest after an eleven-year break. For the first time since the inauguration of the contest the voting procedure did not include a public televote. The overall results were determined by combination of professional and young jurors.

The winner was Georgia with the song "Mzeo" by Mariam Mamadashvili, marking the third time Georgia has won the Junior Eurovision Song Contest (following 2008 and 2011 respectively), making Georgia the first country to win the competition three times. Armenia and Italy finished in second and third place, respectively.

== Location ==
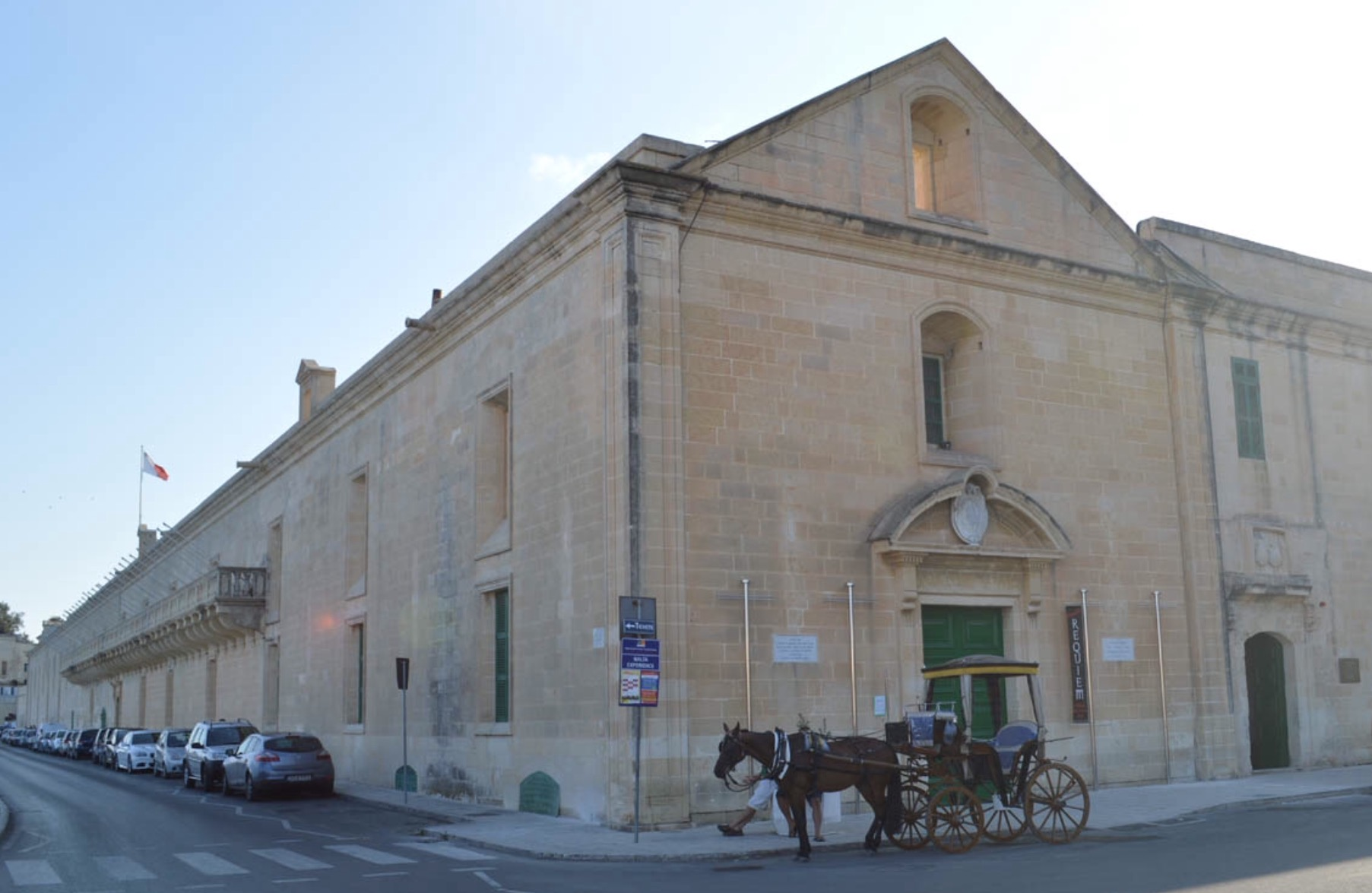
The Mediterranean Conference Centre, venue for 2016.

During a press conference interview on 21 November 2015, a representative from the EBU stated that they had already begun approaching several broadcasters in regards to being the host country for the 2016 contest. On 13 April 2016, it was confirmed that Malta would host the contest. This was the second time that the country hosted the contest, having previously done so in 2014.

The chosen venue was the Mediterranean Conference Centre in Valletta, the Maltese capital. The main stage was in the Republic Hall which typically seats up to 1,400 people, while the green room was placed in a hall next to it, the Sacra Infermeria Hall.

== Participants ==
On 28 September 2016, it was confirmed that seventeen countries would take part in the contest. Cyprus, Israel, and Poland all returned after a one-year, three-year and eleven-year breaks respectively. Montenegro and Slovenia both withdrew from the competition after two contests, and San Marino withdrew after competing in the past three editions. TVM, the Maltese television network operated by the Public Broadcasting Services (PBS), initially expected that a total of eighteen countries would participate in the 2016 contest.

Prior to the event, a digital compilation album featuring all the songs from the 2016 contest, as well as two new songs by 2015 winner Destiny Chukunyere: "Embrace" and "Fast Life", was put together by the European Broadcasting Union and released by Universal Music Group on 12 November 2016.

Participants of the Junior Eurovision Song Contest 2016
Country	Broadcaster	Artist	Song	Language	Songwriter(s)
Albania	RTSH	Klesta Qehaja	"Besoj"	Albanian, English	Adrian Hila; Pandi Laço
Armenia	AMPTV	Anahit and Mary	"Tarber" (Տարբեր)	Armenian, English	Avet Barseghyan; Nick Egibyan
Australia	SBS	Alexa Curtis	"We Are"	English	Boi-1da; Tania Doko; Ali Tamposi
Belarus	BTRC	Alexander Minyonok	"Muzyka moikh pobed (Music Is My Only Way)" (Музыка моих побед)	Russian, English	Kirill Ermakov; Roman Kolodko; Alexander Minyonok
Bulgaria	BNT	Lidia Ganeva	"Magical Day (Valsheben den)" (Вълшебен ден)	Bulgarian, English	Vladimir "Grafa" Ampov; Iliya Grigorov
Cyprus	CyBC	George Michaelides	"Dance Floor"	Greek, English	Andreas Anastasiou; George Michaelides
Georgia	GPB	Mariam Mamadashvili	"Mzeo" (მზეო)	Georgian	Maka Davitaia; Giorgi Kukhianidze
Ireland	TG4	Zena Donnelly	"Bríce ar Bhríce"	Irish, English	Zena Donnelly
Israel	IBA	Shir and Tim	"Follow My Heart"	Hebrew, English	Dor Daniel; Noam Horev
Italy	RAI	Fiamma Boccia	"Cara mamma (Dear Mom)"	Italian, English	Fiamma Boccia; Alessandro Ghironi; Marco Iardella; Francesco Spadoni
Macedonia	MRT	Martija Stanojković	"Love Will Lead Our Way (Ljubovta ne vodi)" (Љубовта не води)	Macedonian, English	Aleksandar Masevski; Martija Stanojković
Malta	PBS	Christina Magrin	"Parachute"	English	Florent Boshnjaku; Christina Magrin; Matt "Muxu" Mercieca
Netherlands	AVROTROS	Kisses	"Kisses and Dancin'"	Dutch, English	Joost Griffioen; Stas Swaczyna; Hansen Tomas
Poland	TVP	Olivia Wieczorek	"Nie zapomnij"	Polish, English	Dominik Grabowski; Piotr Rubik
Russia	VGTRK	The Water of Life Project	"Water of Life"	Russian, English	Rita Dakota
Serbia	RTS	Dunja Jeličić	"U la la la" (У ла ла ла)	Serbian	Vladimir Graić; Dunja Jeličić; Leontina Vukomanović
Ukraine	NTU	Sofia Rol	"Planet Craves for Love"	Ukrainian, English	Sandra Bjurman; Yevgeny Matyushenko; Vitalii Kurovskyi; Ruslan Kvinta; Sofia Rol

== Format ==
=== Executive supervisor dismissal ===
An announcement was made in December 2015, regarding the contract termination of the Junior Eurovision Song Contest Executive Supervisor Vladislav Yakovlev. Yakovlev was fired without any clear reasons after three contests, and was replaced by Jon Ola Sand who has been Executive Supervisor for the Eurovision Song Contest since 2011.

=== Graphic design ===
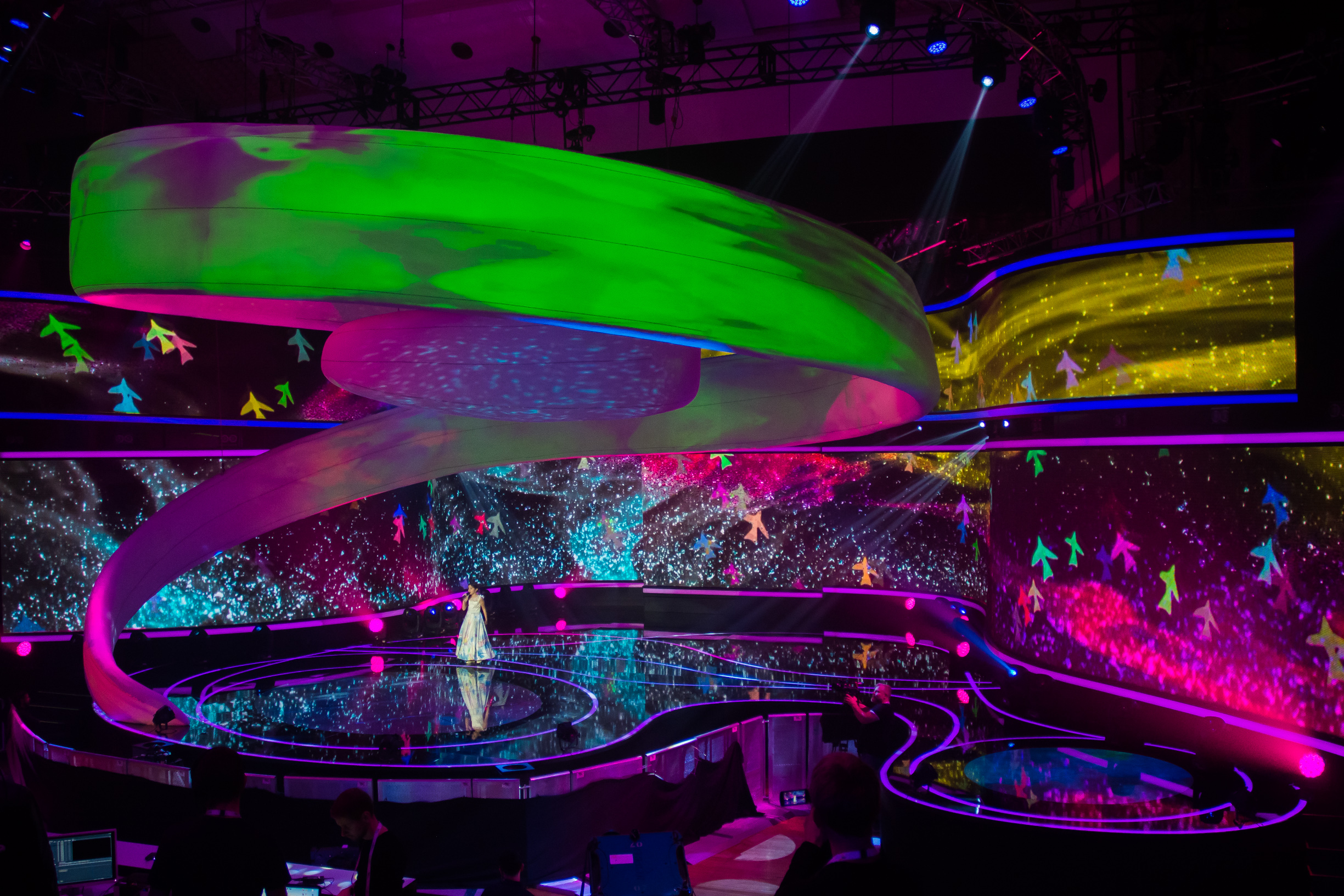
Stage design of the contest during the Bulgarian entry

During a press conference in Stockholm, Sweden, on 13 May 2016, the logo and slogan of the contest were released, intending to represent the contest's values: connectivity, diversity, creativity and respect. The slogan for the contest was "Embrace". On 10 September 2016, it was revealed that each of the postcards preceding the participants' performances would showcase Malta. Filming took place in various locations, including Hastings Gardens and City Gate.

On 8 October 2016, PBS released details regarding the proposed stage design for the contest. The design included a circular stage with an LED backdrop and a spiral structure.

=== Hosts ===
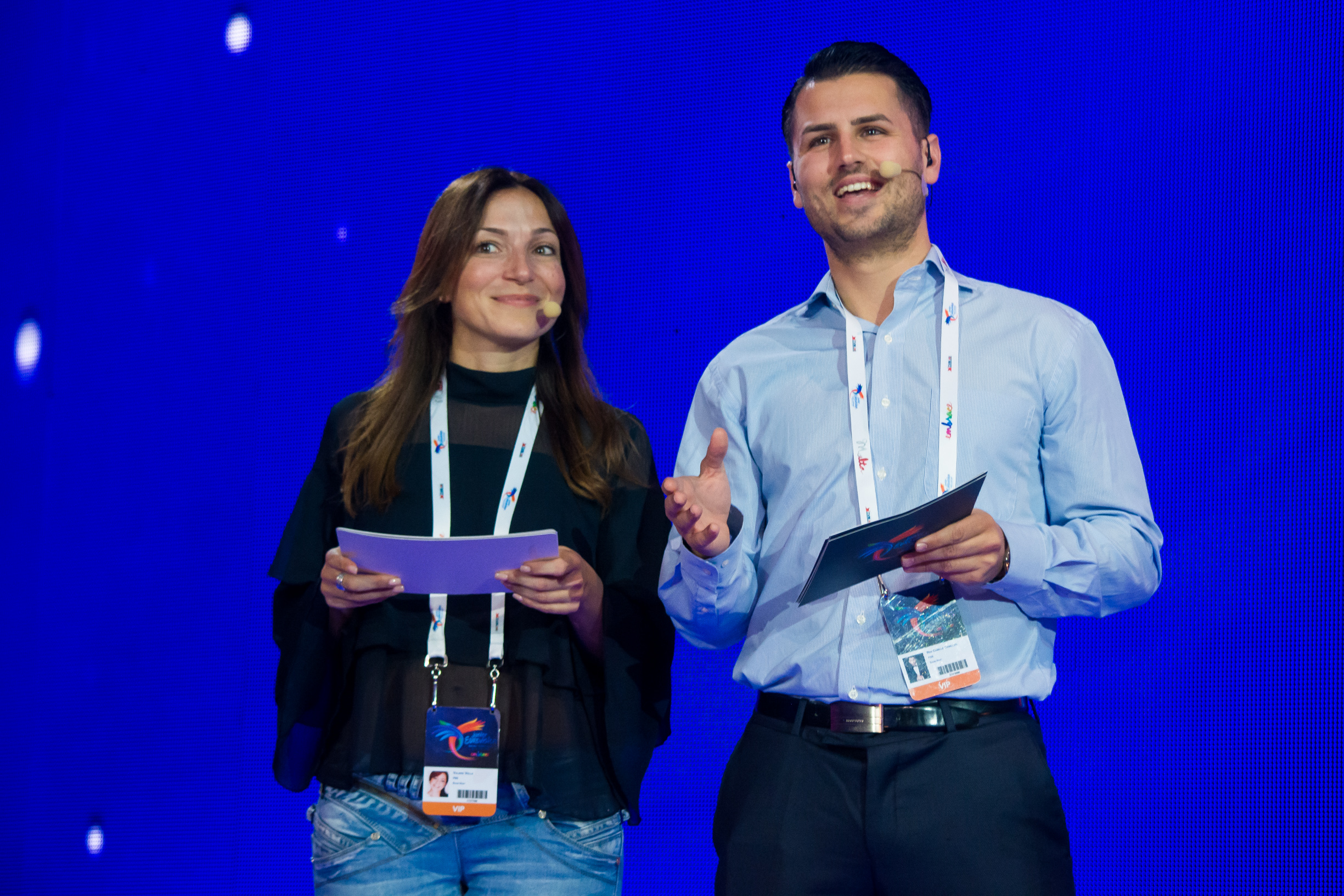
Vella and Camille during a rehearsal

On 28 October 2016, it was announced that Valerie Vella and Ben Camille would host the 2016 contest. Vella is known in Malta as a television presenter, having hosted the Maltese national final for the Eurovision Song Contest in 2002, 2009 and 2011. She presented the Maltese votes at the Eurovision Song Contest in 2000 and 2005 and commented on the Eurovision Song Contest in 2009 and 2010, as well as the Junior Eurovision Song Contest from 2004 to 2009. Camille is also known both as a television presenter and an actor in Malta, notable for having acted in Maltese television show Strada Stretta. He hosted Malta Eurovision Song Contest 2016 and presented the Maltese votes in the Eurovision Song Contest that year.

=== Voting ===
During the press conference for the Junior Eurovision Song Contest 2016, which was held in Stockholm, as the adult contest was being held there, the steering group announced several changes to the voting format for the 2016 contest. Previously, points had been awarded based on a combination of 50% national juries and 50% televoting, from each country with one more set of points also given out by a 'Kids' Jury'. The new voting system would be an adaptation of the new system used in the adult festival, but instead of the televoting, which was removed, a children's jury would be used by each country. In 2016, 1–8, 10, and 12 points were awarded based on a 50/50 combination of each country's Adult and Kids' Jury, announced by a spokesperson. This brought an end to the use of televoting for the first time. For the first time, an expert panel from the professional music industry provided feedback on each of the artists performances. The members of the panel were: Christer Björkman, Mads Grimstad, and the 2011 and 2012, participants at the adult version Jedward. Also for the first time since 2005, the starting 12 points, which were then added to make sure nobody would receive no points, were dropped.

== Contest overview ==
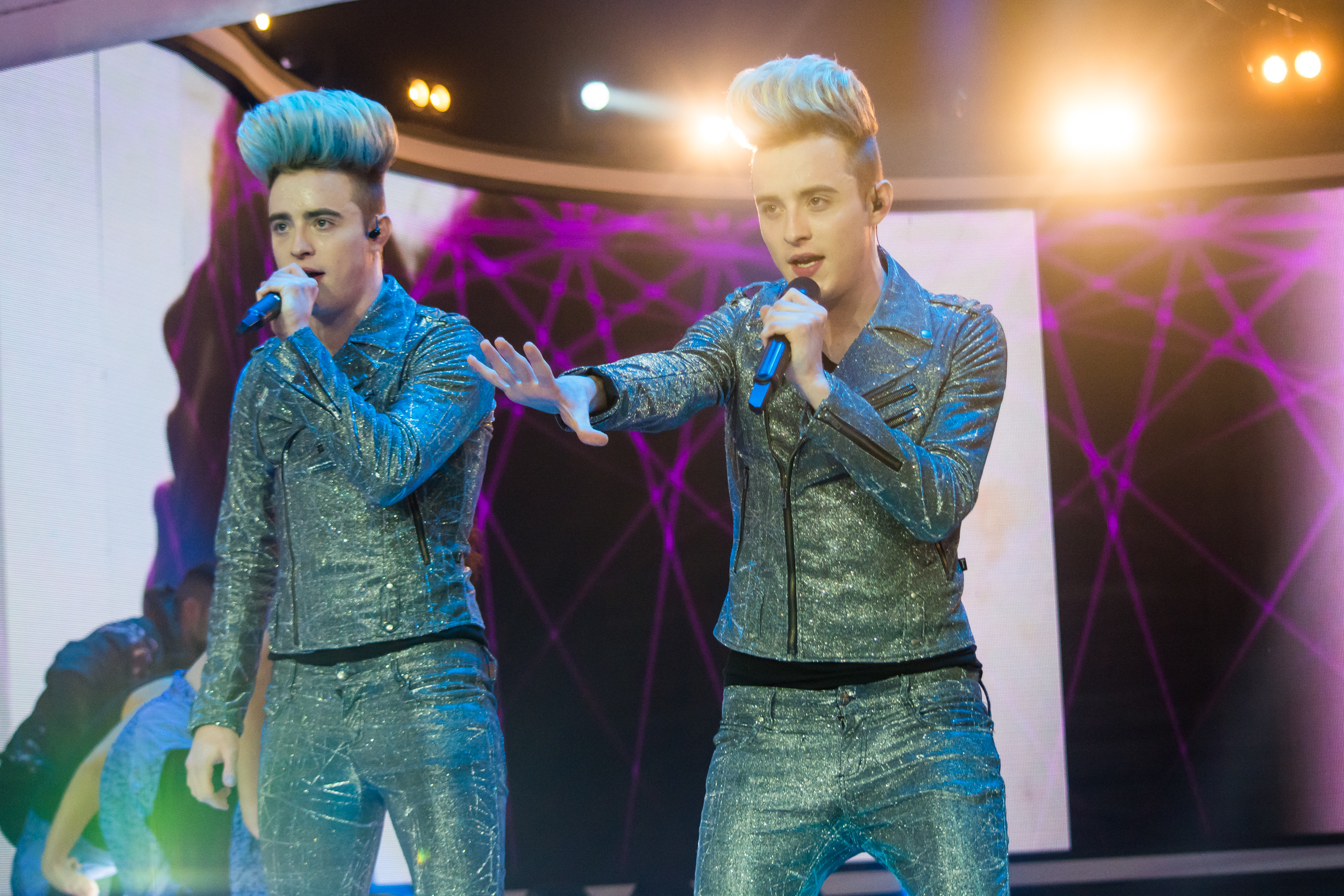
Jedward performed "Hologram" as part of an interval act

The event took place on 20 November 2016 at 16:00 CET. Seventeen countries participated, with the running order published on 15 November 2016. All the countries competing were eligible to vote with the Adult and the Kids jury vote, as well as an Expert jury, eligible to vote. Georgia won with 239 points, also winning the Adult jury vote. Armenia came second with 232 points and won the Kids jury vote, with Italy, Russia (who won the Expert jury vote), and Australia completing the top five. Albania, Ukraine, Israel, Cyprus, and Serbia occupied the bottom five positions.

The opening of the show featured last year's winner Destiny Chukunyere performing her winning entry "Not My Soul" followed by the traditional flag parade accompanied by the theme song "Embrace". The interval acts included Poli Genova performing her Eurovision 2016 entry "If Love Was a Crime" and Jedward performing "Hologram". All participants then joined on stage for a rendition of the common song, "We Are" (not to be confused with the competing Australian entry).

R/O	Country	Artist	Song	Points	Place
1	Ireland	Zena Donnelly	"Bríce ar Bhríce"	122	10
2	Armenia	Anahit and Mary	"Tarber"	232	2
3	Albania	Klesta Qehaja	"Besoj"	38	13
4	Russia	The Water of Life Project	"Water of Life"	202	4
5	Malta	Christina Magrin	"Parachute"	191	6
6	Bulgaria	Lidia Ganeva	"Magical Day (Valsheben den)"	161	9
7	Macedonia	Martija Stanojković	"Love Will Lead Our Way (Ljubovta ne vodi)"	41	12
8	Poland	Olivia Wieczorek	"Nie zapomnij"	60	11
9	Belarus	Alexander Minyonok	"Muzyka moikh pobed (Music Is My Only Way)"	177	7
10	Ukraine	Sofia Rol	"Planet Craves for Love"	30	14
11	Italy	Fiamma Boccia	"Cara mamma (Dear Mom)"	209	3
12	Serbia	Dunja Jeličić	"U la la la"	14	17
13	Israel	Shir and Tim	"Follow My Heart"	27	15
14	Australia	Alexa Curtis	"We Are"	202	5
15	Netherlands	Kisses	"Kisses and Dancin'"	174	8
16	Cyprus	George Michaelides	"Dance Floor"	27	16
17	Georgia	Mariam Mamadashvili	"Mzeo"	239	1

=== Spokespersons ===
The first votes to be announced were those of the professional music industry jury, announced in the order of performance. The expert juries then announced their votes which had been cast live at the contest. Finally, the points awarded by the kids juries were announced as a total in order of the fewest to the greatest number of points received by each country. The spokespersons are shown below alongside each participating country.

1. Ireland – Andrea Leddy
2. Armenia – Mika
3. Albania – Juna Dizdari
4. Russia – Mikhail Smirnov
5. Malta – Gaia Cauchi
6. Bulgaria – Milen Pavlov
7. Macedonia – Antonija Dimitrijevska
8. Poland – Nicoletta Włodarczyk
9. Belarus – Ruslan Aslanov
10. Ukraine – Anna Trincher
11. Italy – Jade Scicluna
12. Serbia – Tomislav Radojević
13. Israel – Itay Limor
14. Australia – Sebastian Hill
15. Netherlands – Anneloes
16. Cyprus – Loucas Demetriou
17. Georgia – Elene Sturua
18. Expert jury – Mads Grimstad
19. Expert jury – Christer Björkman
20. Expert jury – Jedward

== Detailed voting results ==
The votes of the adult jury and the kids jury were cast after the second dress rehearsal, whereas the votes of the expert jury were cast after the performances at the final. Mariam Mamadashvili who represented Georgia with the song "Mzeo", was declared the winner after all the votes had been announced from all of the seventeen participating countries and the expert juries. Below is a full breakdown of how the votes were cast.

Split results
Place	Combined		Adult Jury		Expert Jury		Kids Jury	
Place	Country	Points	Country	Points	Country	Points	Country	Points
1	Georgia	239	Georgia	144	Russia	29	Armenia	110
2	Armenia	232	Armenia	99	Armenia	23	Malta	105
3	Italy	209	Netherlands	94	Italy	22	Russia	105
4	Russia	202	Belarus	92	Belarus	20	Italy	103
5	Australia	202	Australia	86	Australia	17	Australia	99
6	Malta	191	Italy	84	Bulgaria	15	Georgia	83
7	Belarus	177	Malta	80	Netherlands	15	Bulgaria	68
8	Netherlands	174	Bulgaria	78	Georgia	12	Netherlands	65
9	Bulgaria	161	Russia	68	Ireland	9	Belarus	65
10	Ireland	122	Ireland	56	Malta	6	Ireland	57
11	Poland	60	Albania	23	Poland	3	Poland	36
12	Macedonia	41	Poland	21	Albania	2	Macedonia	24
13	Albania	38	Ukraine	18	Israel	1	Israel	20
14	Ukraine	30	Macedonia	17	Macedonia	0	Albania	13
15	Israel	27	Cyprus	15	Ukraine	0	Ukraine	12
16	Cyprus	27	Israel	6	Serbia	0	Cyprus	12
17	Serbia	14	Serbia	5	Cyprus	0	Serbia	9

Detailed voting results (Adult jury votes)
Voting procedure used: Adult jury Expert jury Kids jury		Total score	Adult jury score	Expert jury score	Kids jury score	Ireland	Armenia	Albania	Russia	Malta	Bulgaria	Macedonia	Poland	Belarus	Ukraine	Italy	Serbia	Israel	Australia	Netherlands	Cyprus	Georgia
Contestants	Ireland	122	56	9	57			1	1	**12**	3				10	**12**	6		8		3	
Contestants	Armenia	232	99	23	110	4			7	10	8	10		10	2		**12**	10	4	7	7	8
Contestants	Albania	38	23	2	13				2	4				2		5	7		1		2	
Contestants	Russia	202	68	29	105	7	6	4			1	8	7	7	4	2	5	5	2	3	4	3
Contestants	Malta	191	80	6	105	1	4	7	3		5	6	1	8	5	10		1	**12**		10	7
Contestants	Bulgaria	161	78	15	68	3	8	6		6		7	**12**	5	3	7	1		7	6	1	6
Contestants	Macedonia	41	17	0	24			2		2						1	3	2	5	2		
Contestants	Poland	60	21	3	36		2		4	1		2		1		6		4				1
Contestants	Belarus	177	92	20	65	8	7		**12**	5	10	3	5					**12**	10	10	8	2
Contestants	Ukraine	30	18	0	12		3				2		4					3		1		5
Contestants	Italy	209	84	22	103	10	1	8	5		6	**12**	6	4	6		2	7		8	5	4
Contestants	Serbia	14	5	0	9							5										
Contestants	Israel	27	6	1	20			3					2		1							
Contestants	Australia	202	86	17	99	5	5	10	6	8	4	1	10	6	7	8				4		**12**
Contestants	Netherlands	174	94	15	65	6	10	5	8	7	7	4	3	3	8	4	4	6	3		6	10
Contestants	Cyprus	27	15	0	12	2											8			5		
Contestants	Georgia	**239**	144	12	83	**12**	**12**	**12**	10	3	**12**		8	**12**	**12**	3	10	8	6	**12**	**12**	

Detailed voting results (Expert jury votes)
Voting procedure used: Adult jury Expert jury Kids jury		Total score	Adult jury score	Expert jury score	Kids jury score	Mads Grimstad	Christer Björkman	Jedward
Contestants	Ireland	122	56	9	57	4		5
Contestants	Armenia	232	99	23	110	5	8	10
Contestants	Albania	38	23	2	13		2	
Contestants	Russia	202	68	29	105	10	7	**12**
Contestants	Malta	191	80	6	105	2		4
Contestants	Bulgaria	161	78	15	68	8	6	1
Contestants	Macedonia	41	17	0	24			
Contestants	Poland	60	21	3	36			3
Contestants	Belarus	177	92	20	65	6	**12**	2
Contestants	Ukraine	30	18	0	12			
Contestants	Italy	209	84	22	103	**12**	10	
Contestants	Serbia	14	5	0	9			
Contestants	Israel	27	6	1	20		1	
Contestants	Australia	202	86	17	99	7	3	7
Contestants	Netherlands	174	94	15	65	3	4	8
Contestants	Cyprus	27	15	0	12			
Contestants	Georgia	**239**	144	12	83	1	5	6

Detailed voting results (Kids jury vote)
Voting procedure used: Adult jury Expert jury Kids jury		Total score	Adult jury score	Expert jury score	Kids jury score	Ireland	Armenia	Albania	Russia	Malta	Bulgaria	Macedonia	Poland	Belarus	Ukraine	Italy	Serbia	Israel	Australia	Netherlands	Cyprus	Georgia
Contestants	Ireland	122	56	9	57			8	1	10			7	2	7	8		1	6	2	5	
Contestants	Armenia	232	99	23	110	7		6	10	7	**12**	8		**12**	5	10	10		5	6	4	8
Contestants	Albania	38	23	2	13		4					1	4		1				2	1		
Contestants	Russia	202	68	29	105	8	3			2	10	**12**	6	10	8	6	**12**	6		10	6	6
Contestants	Malta	191	80	6	105	5	6	**12**	8		5	10	10	5	3	**12**	4		10	3	7	5
Contestants	Bulgaria	161	78	15	68	6	5	5	3	5		6	1	8	2	3	3	8	3	7	3	
Contestants	Macedonia	41	17	0	24			7		1			2			2		3		8		1
Contestants	Poland	60	21	3	36		**12**	1		4	2			7				10				
Contestants	Belarus	177	92	20	65		8		**12**		8				6	5	7	5	7			7
Contestants	Ukraine	30	18	0	12					3	4			4					1			
Contestants	Italy	209	84	22	103	10	1	10	2	**12**	7	7	**12**	6			5	7	8	4	8	4
Contestants	Serbia	14	5	0	9						3	3				1						2
Contestants	Israel	27	6	1	20	1		3					5			4	1		4		2	
Contestants	Australia	202	86	17	99	**12**		2	7	8	6	2	8	1	4	7	6	4		**12**	10	10
Contestants	Netherlands	174	94	15	65	4	7		6	6	1	4			10		2	**12**			1	**12**
Contestants	Cyprus	27	15	0	12	2	2		5													3
Contestants	Georgia	**239**	144	12	83	3	10	4	4			5	3	3	**12**		8	2	**12**	5	**12**	

=== 12 points ===
Below is a summary of the maximum 12 points awarded by each country's adult and kids jury. Countries in bold gave the maximum 24 points (12 points apiece from the adult and kids jury) to the specified entrant.

12 points awarded by adult juries
N.	Contestant	Nation(s) giving 12 points
8	Georgia	Albania, Armenia, Belarus, Bulgaria, **Cyprus**, Ireland, Netherlands, **Ukraine**
2	Belarus	Israel, **Russia**
2	Ireland	Italy, Malta
1	Armenia	Serbia
1	Australia	Georgia
1	Bulgaria	Poland
1	Italy	Macedonia
1	Malta	Australia

12 points awarded by the expert juries
N.	Contestant	Juror(s) giving 12 points
1	Belarus	Christer Björkman
1	Italy	Mads Grimstad
1	Russia	Jedward

12 points awarded by the kids juries
N.	Contestant	Nation(s) giving 12 points
3	Georgia	Australia, **Cyprus**, **Ukraine**
2	Armenia	Belarus, Bulgaria
2	Australia	Ireland, Netherlands
2	Italy	Malta, Poland
2	Malta	Albania, Italy
2	Netherlands	Georgia, Israel
2	Russia	Macedonia, Serbia
1	Belarus	**Russia**
1	Poland	Armenia

== Other countries ==
For a country to be eligible for potential participation in the Junior Eurovision Song Contest, it needs to be an active member of the European Broadcasting Union (EBU). It is unknown whether the EBU issue invitations of participation to all 56 active members like they do for the Eurovision Song Contest. At a press conference held during the Junior Eurovision Song Contest 2015, the former contest Executive Supervisor, Vladislav Yakovlev, announced that broadcasters in Estonia, Latvia and Lithuania had expressed interest in participation. Additionally, during the Junior Eurovision Song Contest press conference held in Stockholm during the Eurovision Song Contest 2016, Jon Ola Sand confirmed that the EBU was in contact with a number of broadcasters regarding participation including Belgium, France, Germany and Spain.

The EBU Active Members, listed below, had made the following announcements in regards to their decisions:

=== Active EBU members ===
- Denmark – Right after the 2015 edition, Denmark's national broadcaster DR announced that they would "no longer" participate in further editions of the Junior Eurovision Song Contest. Jan Lagermand Lundme, the Entertainment President of DR, stated that the reason behind this decision was because the competition had become too much of a copy of the main Eurovision Song Contest and that the contest had strayed from its core idea—"the joy, the humor and the play".
- France – On 18 November 2015, it was reported that the French broadcaster France Télévisions was interested in returning to the contest. Edoardo Grassi, the Head of Delegation for France in the Eurovision Song Contest, was one of the jury members at the Maltese national selection for the 2016 Junior Eurovision, and was introduced by the hosts of the show as being the Head of Delegation for France in the Junior Eurovision Song Contest. The broadcaster was ultimately not among the participants for the 2016 edition.
- Slovenia – On 24 May 2016, the Slovenian broadcaster Radiotelevizija Slovenija (RTVSLO) announced that they would withdraw from the contest for the first time since their debut in the 2014 edition of the contest. The broadcaster explained that the decision was made based on changes to the contest rules by the EBU, although not specifying which rule changes influenced their decision to withdraw from the competition. RTVSLO still broadcast the 2016 contest.
- Switzerland – Radiotelevisione svizzera (RSI) confirmed on 5 July 2016 that they would not return to the contest in 2016 due to the cost of the participation.

== Broadcasts ==
Broadcasters and commentators in participating countries
Country	Broadcaster(s)	Commentator(s)	Ref.
Albania	TVSH, RTSH Muzikë, Radio Tirana	Andri Xhahu	
Armenia	Armenia 1	Avet Barseghyan	
Australia	SBS One	No commentary	
Belarus	Belarus 1, Belarus 24	Julia Pertsova	
Bulgaria	BNT 1, BNT HD, BNT World	Elena Rosberg and Georgi Kushvaliev	
Cyprus	CyBC 2	Kyriacos Pastides	
Georgia	GPB 1TV	Demetre Ergemlidze	
Ireland	TG4	Eoghan McDermott	
Israel	Channel 1	No commentary	
Italy	Rai Gulp	Simone Lijoi and Laura Carusino Vignera	
Macedonia	MRT 1	Eli Tanaskovska	
Malta	TVM	No commentary	
Netherlands	NPO Zapp	Jan Smit	
Poland	TVP1 and TVP Polonia	Artur Orzech	
Russia	Carousel	Olga Shelest	
Serbia	RTS2, RTS Sat	Silvana Grujić	
Ukraine	UA:Pershyi	Timur Miroshnychenko	

Broadcasters and commentators in non-participating countries
Country	Broadcaster(s)	Commentator(s)	Ref.
Germany	NDR website	Thomas Mohr	
New Zealand	World FM 88.2	Ewan Spence, Lisa-Jayne Lewis, Sharleen Wright and Ben Robertson	
Singapore	247 Disco Heaven	Ewan Spence, Lisa-Jayne Lewis, Sharleen Wright and Ben Robertson	
Slovenia	TV SLO 2	Andrej Hofer	
United Kingdom	Radio Six International, Fun Kids, 103 The Eye	Ewan Spence, Lisa-Jayne Lewis, Sharleen Wright and Ben Robertson	
United States	KCGW-LP, KLZY-LP, KMJY-LP, WCGD-LP	Ewan Spence, Lisa-Jayne Lewis, Sharleen Wright and Ben Robertson	

== See also ==
- ABU Radio Song Festival 2016
- ABU TV Song Festival 2016
- Eurovision Young Musicians 2016
- Eurovision Song Contest 2016
