= WITB =

WITB may refer to:

- Working income tax benefit, a refundable tax credit for low-income working people in Canada
- WITB-LP, a radio station licensed to Benton, Kentucky, USA
