= WHFV =

WHFV may refer to:

- WHFV (FM), Catholic radio station in Shenandoah, Virginia
- WHFV (Fredericksburg, Virginia), television station in Fredericksburg, Virginia that existed from 1973 to 1975
