= KOGD =

KOGD may refer to:

- Ogden-Hinckley Airport (ICAO code KOGD)
- KOGD-LP, a low-power radio station (107.1 FM) licensed to serve Shawnee, Oklahoma, United States
