= Kofr =

Kofr may refer to:

- Kafir
- KOFR-LP, low-power FM radio station in Lander, Wyoming, US

== Acronyms ==
- King of Fighters R-1 (KOF R-1), video game
- King of Fighters R-2 (KOF R-2), video game
- Knights of Reciprocity (KofR), defunct American semi-political secret society
