= XHJAQ-FM =

Radio station in Jalpan de Serra, Querétaro, Mexico

- Jalpan, Querétaro; Mexico
- Frequency: 107.1 MHz
- Branding: La Ke Buena

Programming
- Format: Regional Mexican
- Affiliations: Radiópolis

Ownership
- Owner: Grupo Edikam; (Edikam Comunicación, S.A. de C.V.)

History
- First air date: June 6, 1982 (concession)
- Call sign meaning: Jalpan de Serra, Querétaro

Technical information
- Class: C1
- ERP: 25 kW
- HAAT: 651.2 m
- Transmitter coordinates: 21°06′42.1″N 99°29′13.2″W

Links
- Website: kebuenaqro.mx

XHJAQ-FM is a radio station on 107.1 FM in Jalpan, Querétaro. The station is owned by Grupo Edikam and carries the Ke Buena Regional Mexican format from Radiópolis. The transmitter is located atop Cerro la Colgada in Jalpan, Querétaro.

== History ==
XHJAQ began as XEJAQ-AM 1040 (later 850), awarded to Rosenda Carmen Sandoval on June 6, 1982. It was initially known as Radio Felicidad, then Radio Joya. For a time, it carried the La Jefa/La Única Regional Mexican format from Grupo Siete.

In December 2011, XEJAQ received approval to migrate to FM on 107.1 MHz.
