= XHETA-FM =

Radio station in Zitácuaro, Michoacán, Mexico

Zitácuaro, Michoacán; Mexico
- Frequency: 107.1 FM
- Branding: Esencia Radio

Programming
- Format: Pop

Ownership
- Owner: Pichir Estéban Silva; (Sucesión de Pichir Estéban Polos)
- Sister stations: XHLX-FM

History
- First air date: March 2, 1950 (concession)

Technical information
- ERP: 10 kW
- Transmitter coordinates: 19°25′57″N 100°21′25″W

Links
- Webcast: Listen live
- Website: radiozitacuaro.com

XHETA-FM is a radio station on 107.1 FM in Zitácuaro, Michoacán, Mexico. It is owned by Radio Zitácuaro, S.A. and known as Esencia Radio.

== History ==
XETA-AM received its concession on March 2, 1950. It broadcast on 1080 kHz and was owned by Manuel Estéban Polos. Control transferred to Pichir Estéban Polos in the 1960s and XETA began broadcasting with 500 watts on 600 kHz.

In the 1990s, XETA increased power to 1,000 watts. It was approved to migrate to FM in 2011.

Until early 2016, it was known as Solo Hits.
