= XHTGAN-FM =

Community radio station in Tangancícuaro, Michoacán, Mexico

Tangancícuaro, Michoacán; Mexico
- Frequency: 107.1 FM
- Branding: Radio Erandi

Programming
- Format: Community radio

Ownership
- Owner: Radio Erandi, A.C.

History
- First air date: March 14, 2005 (XHFC-FM permit)
- Former call signs: XHFC-FM
- Former frequencies: 107.9 MHz, 106.1 MHz
- Call sign meaning: TanGANcícuaro

Technical information
- ERP: .5 kW (as XHFC)
- Transmitter coordinates: 19°53′17″N 102°12′32″W

Links
- Website: radioerandi.radio12345.com

XHTGAN-FM is a community radio station on 107.1 FM in Tangancícuaro, Michoacán, Mexico. It is known as Radio Erandi.

== History ==
Radio Erandi, original callsign XHFC-FM, was permitted on March 14, 2005, but its story predates the original permit. Frente Cívico Tangancícuaro, Pueblo Unido, A.C., the original permitholder, was created in 2001 in response to abuses of power by the municipal government. In 2006, the station had an all-volunteer crew of announcers and staff.

The original Radio Erandi permit wound up not renewed, and a new community concession was applied for to replace XHFC-FM. In December 2017, XHTGAN-FM 106.1 was approved to replace XHFC. On October 16, 2019, in order to resolve co-channel interference problems with XHCHIL-FM in Chilchota, XHTGAN was ordered to move to 107.1 MHz, carrying out the change on January 1, 2020.
