= XHLX-FM =

Radio station in Zitácuaro, Michoacán, Mexico

- Zitácuaro, Michoacán; Mexico
- Frequency: 95.1 MHz
- Branding: La Que Te Prende

Programming
- Format: Grupera

Ownership
- Owner: Pichir Estéban Silva; (Radio Zitácuaro, S.A.)
- Sister stations: XHETA-FM

History
- First air date: March 28, 1956 (concession)
- Former frequencies: 700 kHz

Technical information
- ERP: 10 kW
- HAAT: -151.7 m
- Transmitter coordinates: 19°26′18″N 100°20′49″W

Links
- Webcast: Listen live
- Website: www.radiozitacuaro.com

XHLX-FM is a radio station on 95.1 FM in Zitácuaro, Michoacán, Mexico. It is owned by Radio Zitácuaro, S.A. and carries a grupera format known as La Que Te Prende.

== History ==
XELX-AM received its concession on March 28, 1956. It broadcast with 10 kW on 1460 kHz.

In the 1990s, XELX moved to 700 kHz and cut its nighttime power to 500 watts. It was approved to migrate to FM in 2011.

Until early 2016, it broadcast the grupera format programmed by Grupo Siete Comunicación (known as La Jefa and later La Única).
