= Mzeo =

2016 single by Mariam Mamadashvili

Single by Mariam Mamadashvili
- Released: 24 October 2016
- Recorded: 2016
- Genre: Pop; jazz
- Length: 3:01
- Songwriter: Maka Davitaia
- Producer: Giga Kukhianidze

Mariam Mamadashvili singles chronology
"Let It Go" (2015)	"Mzeo" (2016)

Junior Eurovision Song Contest 2016 entry
- Country: Georgia
- Artist: Mariam Mamadashvili
- Language: Georgian
- Composer: Giga Kukhianidze
- Lyricist: Maka Davitaia

Finals performance
- Final result: 1st
- Final points: 239

Entry chronology
- ◄ "Gabede" (2015)
- "Voice of the Heart" (2017) ►

"Mzeo" (Georgian: მზეო, English: Sun) is a song by Georgian singer Mariam Mamadashvili. It represented Georgia and was the winning song at the Junior Eurovision Song Contest 2016 in Valletta, Malta. Mamadashvili also performed Mzeo in the opening of the 2017 edition of the contest.

== Music video ==
The music video was released on 24 October 2016. It features Mamadashvili performing the song in a studio setting.
