= Georgia in the Junior Eurovision Song Contest =

- Junior Eurovision Song Contest
- Participating broadcaster: Georgian Public Broadcaster (GPB)

Participation summary
- Appearances: 20
- First appearance: 2007
- Highest placement: 1st: 2008, 2011, 2016, 2024
- Host: 2017, 2025
- Participation history: 2007; 2008; 2009; 2010; 2011; 2012; 2013; 2014; 2015; 2016; 2017; 2018; 2019; 2020; 2021; 2022; 2023; 2024; 2025; 2026
- For the most recent participation see Georgia in the Junior Eurovision Song Contest 2026

Georgia has been represented at the Junior Eurovision Song Contest since 2007. The Georgian participating broadcaster in the contest is Georgian Public Broadcaster (GPB). Its first entry at the 2007 contest was "Odelia Ranuni" by Mariam Romelashvili, which finished in fourth place out of seventeen participants, achieving a score of one hundred and sixteen points. Since their debut, it has never missed an edition of the contest. Along with France, they are the most successful country in the contest (in terms of wins, not average scores), having won a total of four times, namely in 2008, 2011, 2016 and 2024. GPB hosted the contest for the first time in 2017 at the Olympic Palace in Tbilisi and in 2025 at the Gymnastic Hall of Olympic City.

== History ==
Georgia's first entry was Mariam Romelashvili with the song "Odelia Ranuni", which finished fourth of 17 entries at the contest in Rotterdam in 2007. Georgia was represented in 2008 by Bzikebi with the song "Bzz..", performed in an imaginary language. The song went on to win the contest, receiving 154 points and a total of eight 12-point votes out of 14 countries, the second-highest proportion of 12 points received by a winner in either Eurovision Contests, just beaten by Anastasiya Petryk in 2012.

In 2011, Georgia won the contest again with the band Candy who performed the song "Candy Music". The song won the competition with 108 points.

At the Junior Eurovision Song Contest 2014, Georgia failed to reach the top 10 for the first time: Lizi Pop finished in 11th place with the song "Happy Day". However, the official video of the song uploaded to the contest's official YouTube channel is the second most-viewed video, only behind Roksana Węgiel's "Anyone I Want to Be", counting more than 29 million views as of June 2023.

In 2016, Georgia once again won the contest with the song "Mzeo" performed by Mariam Mamadashvili, making Georgia the first country to win the contest three times. Following this victory, Georgia hosted the Junior Eurovision Song Contest 2017 on 26 November at the Olympic Palace in Tbilisi. Helen Kalandadze and Lizi Japaridze hosted the contest.

In 2019, Giorgi Rostiashvili's "We Need Love" finished 14th in the final, marking Georgia achieved its worst result. This would later be matched by Anastasia and Ranina's entry "Over the Sky" in 2023.

The following year, in 2024, Georgia once again won the contest with the song "To My Mom" performed by Andria Putkaradze, making Georgia the first country to win the contest four times.

== Participation overview ==
Table key
1	First place
2	Second place
3	Third place

Year	Artist	Song	Language	Place	Points
2007	Mariam Romelashvili	"Odelia ranuni" (ოდელია რანუნი)	Georgian	4	116
2008	Bzikebi	"Bzz.."	Imaginary	1	154
2009	Princesses	"Lurji prinveli" (ლურჯი ფრინველი)	Georgian, English	6	68
2010	Mariam Kakhelishvili	"Mari-Dari" (მარი-დარი)	Imaginary	4	109
2011	Candy	"Candy Music"	Georgian, English	1	108
2012	The Funkids	"Funky Lemonade"	Georgian, English	2	103
2013	The Smile Shop	"Give Me Your Smile"	Georgian, English	5	91
2014	Lizi Pop	"Happy Day"	Georgian, English	11	54
2015	The Virus	"Gabede" (გაბედე)	Georgian	10	51
2016	Mariam Mamadashvili	"Mzeo" (მზეო)	Georgian	1	239
2017	Grigol Kipshidze	"Voice of the Heart"	Georgian	2	185
2018	Tamar Edilashvili	"Your Voice"	Georgian, English	8	144
2019	Giorgi Rostiashvili	"We Need Love"	Georgian, English	14	69
2020	Sandra Gadelia	"You Are Not Alone"	Georgian, English	6	111
2021	Niko Kajaia	"Let's Count the Smiles"	Georgian, French, English	4	163
2022	Mariam Bigvava	"I Believe"	Georgian, English	3	161
2023	Anastasia and Ranina	"Over the Sky"	Georgian, English	14	74
2024	Andria Putkaradze	"To My Mom"	Georgian	1	239
2025	Anita Abgariani	"Shine Like a Star"	Georgian, English	3	176
2026	Davit Lomidze	"Sun on the Rooftops"	Georgian	5	145

== Commentators and spokespersons ==
The contests are broadcast online worldwide through the official Junior Eurovision Song Contest website junioreurovision.tv and YouTube. In 2015, the online broadcasts featured commentary in English by junioreurovision.tv editor Luke Fisher and 2011 Bulgarian Junior Eurovision Song Contest entrant Ivan Ivanov. The Georgian broadcaster, GPB, sent their own commentators to each contest in order to provide commentary in the Georgian language. Spokespersons were also chosen by the national broadcaster to announce the awarding points from Georgia. The table below lists the details of each commentator and spokesperson since 2007.

Year	Channel	Commentator	Spokesperson	Ref.
2007	1TV	Temo Kvirkvelia	Nino Epremidze	
2008	1TV	Temo Kvirkvelia	Ana Davitaia	
2009	1TV	Sofia Avtunashvili	Ana Davitaia	
2010	1TV	Temo Kvirkvelia	Giorgi Toradze	
2011	1TV	Temo Kvirkvelia	Elene Makashvili	
2012	1TV	Temo Kvirkvelia	Candy	
2013	1TV	Natia Bunturi and Giorgi Grdzelishvili	Elene Megrelishvili	
2014	1TV	Mero Chikashvili and Temo Kvirkvelia	Mariam Khunjgurua	
2015	1TV	Tuta Chkheidze	Lizi Pop	
2016	1TV	Demetre Ergemlidze	Elene Sturua	
2017	1TV	Demetre Ergemlidze	Lizi Tavberidze	
2018	1TV	Helen Kalandadze and George Abashidze	Nikoloz Vasadze	
2019	1TV	Demetre Ergemlidze and Tamar Edilashvili	Anastasia Garsevanishvili	
2020	1TV	Helen Kalandadze	Marita Khvedelidze	
2021	1TV	Nika Lobiladze	Sandra Gadelia	
2022	1TV	Nika Lobiladze	Niko Kajaia	
2023	1TV	Nika Lobiladze	Mariam Bigvava	
2024	First Channel Sport	Nika Lobiladze	Anastasia Vasadze	
2025	1TV	Nika Lobiladze	Vache Gviniashvili	
2026	1TV	Nika Lobiladze	Anita Abgariani	

== Hostings ==
Year	Location	Venue	Presenters
2017	Tbilisi	Olympic Palace	Helen Kalandadze and Lizi Japaridze
2025	Tbilisi	Gymnastic Hall of Olympic City	David Aladashvili and Liza Tsiklauri

== Photo gallery ==
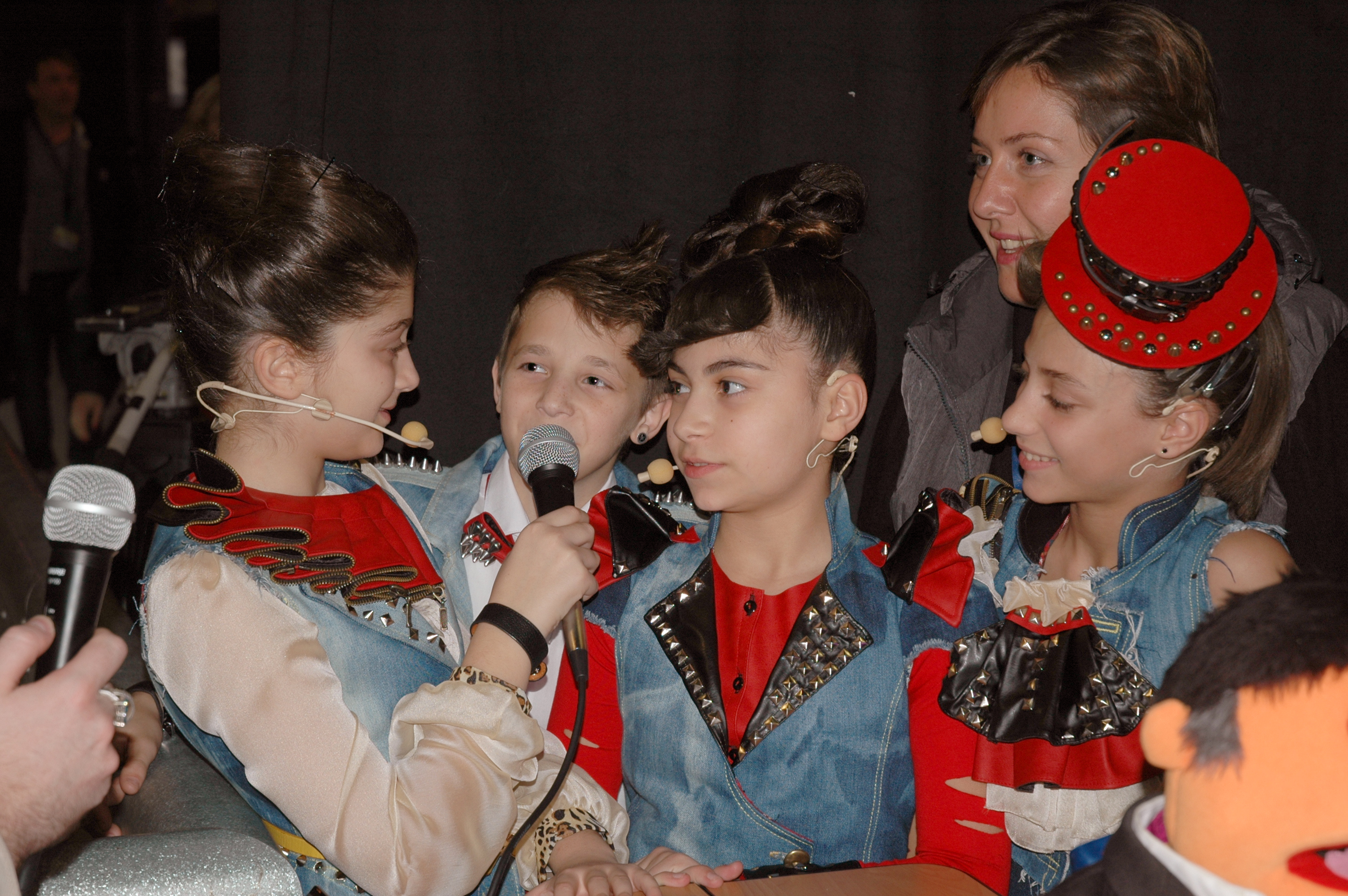
The Funkids in Amsterdam (2012)

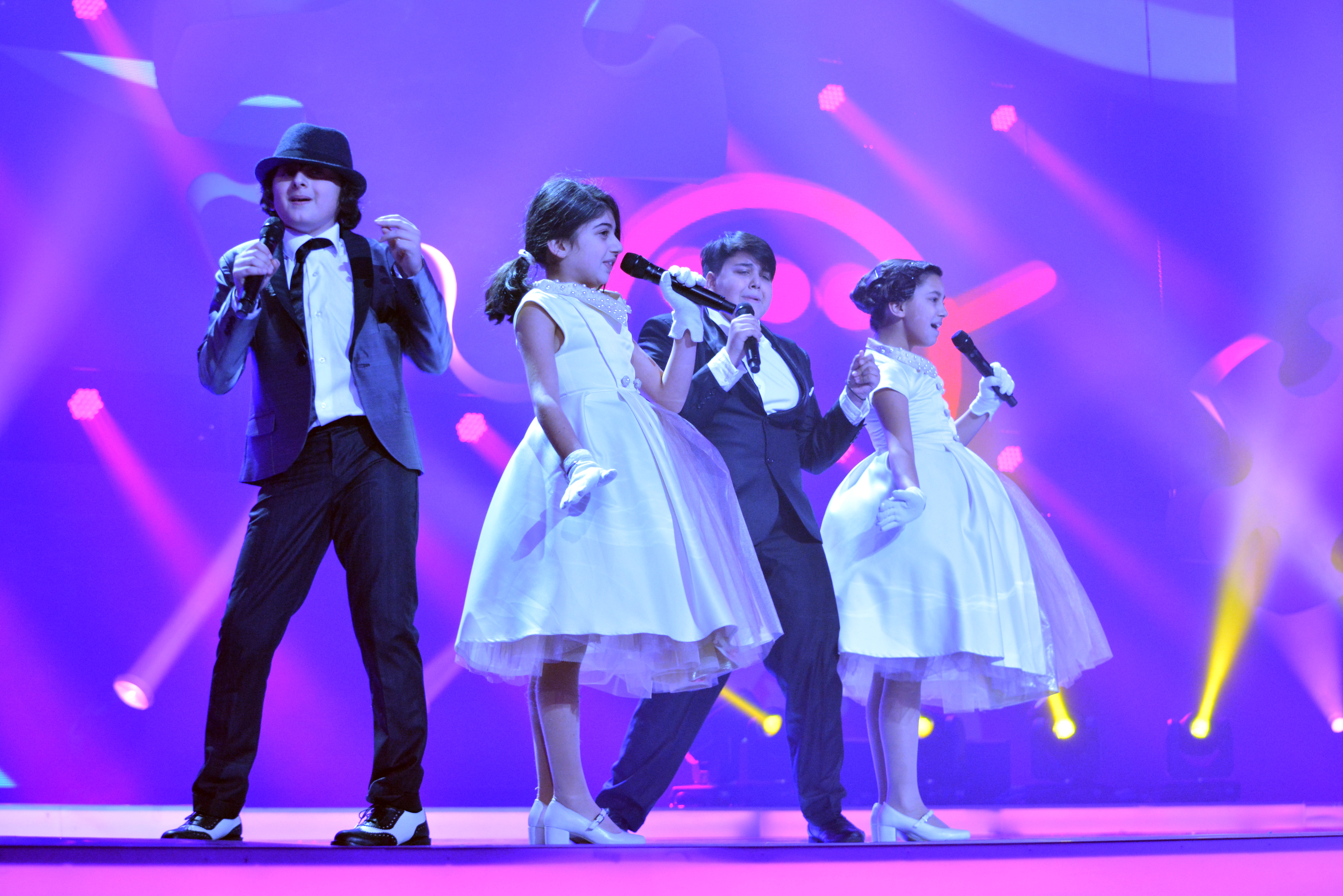
The Smile Shop in Kyiv (2013)

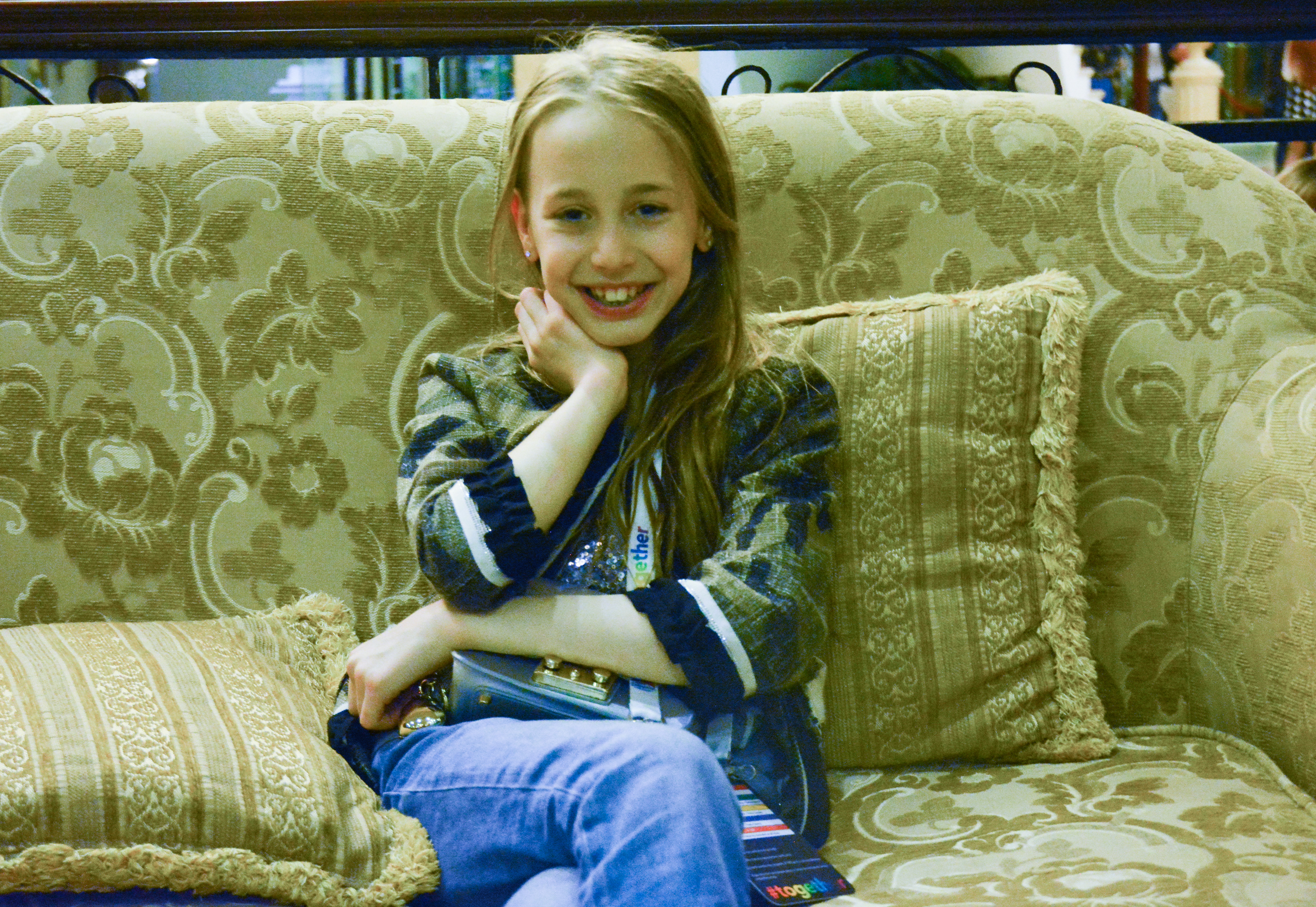
Lizi Pop in Malta (2014)

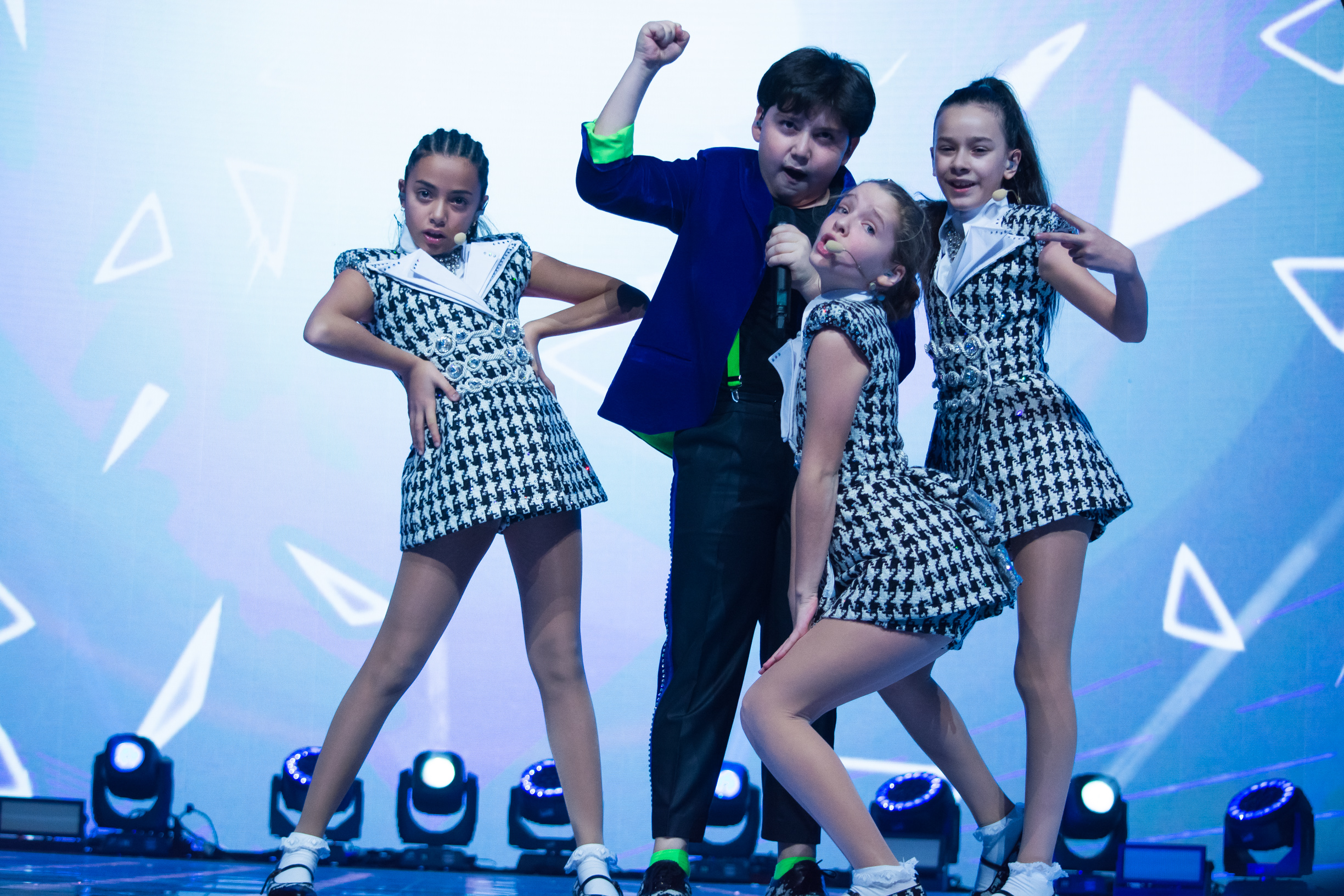
The Virus in Sofia (2015)

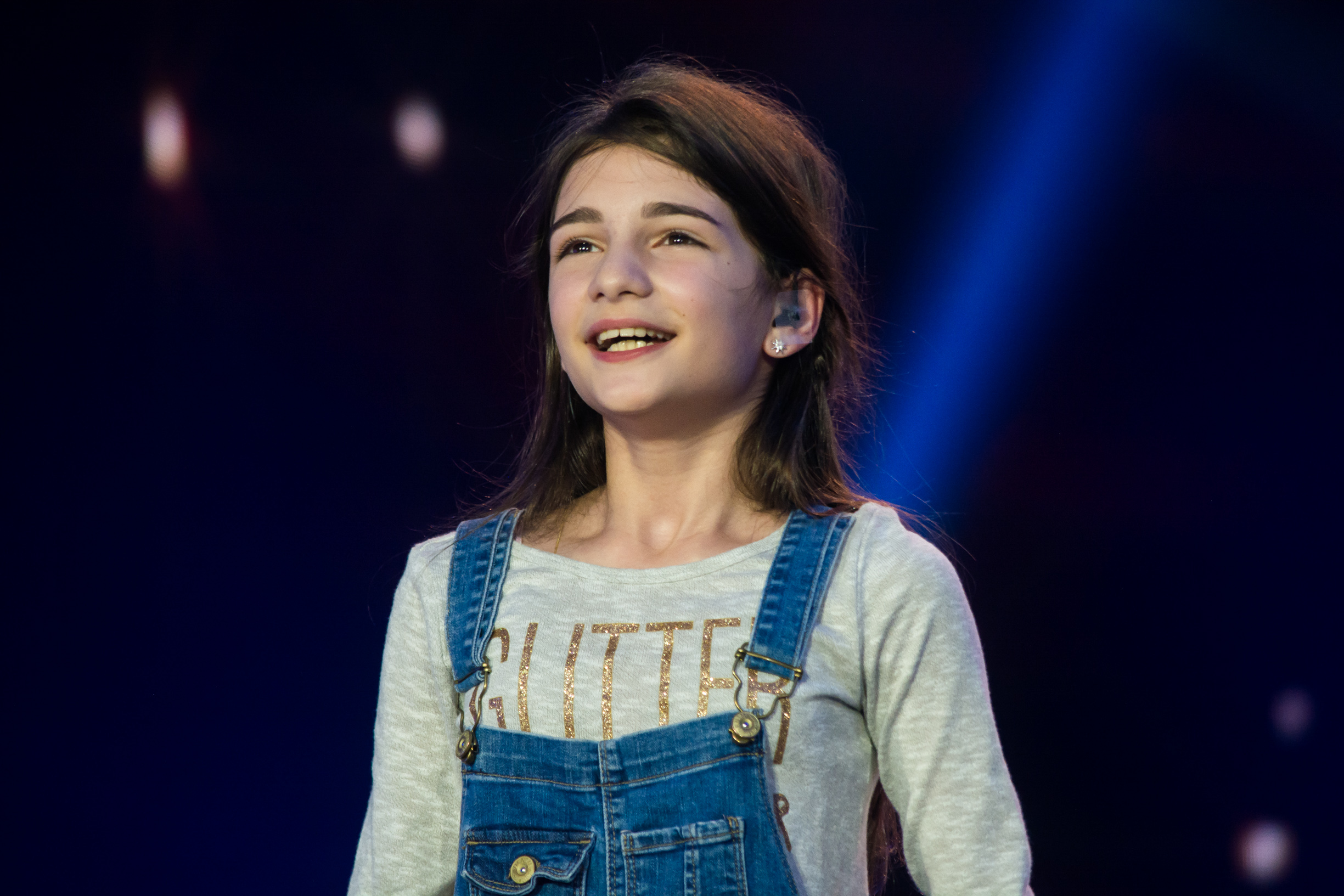
Mariam Mamadashvili in Valletta (2016)

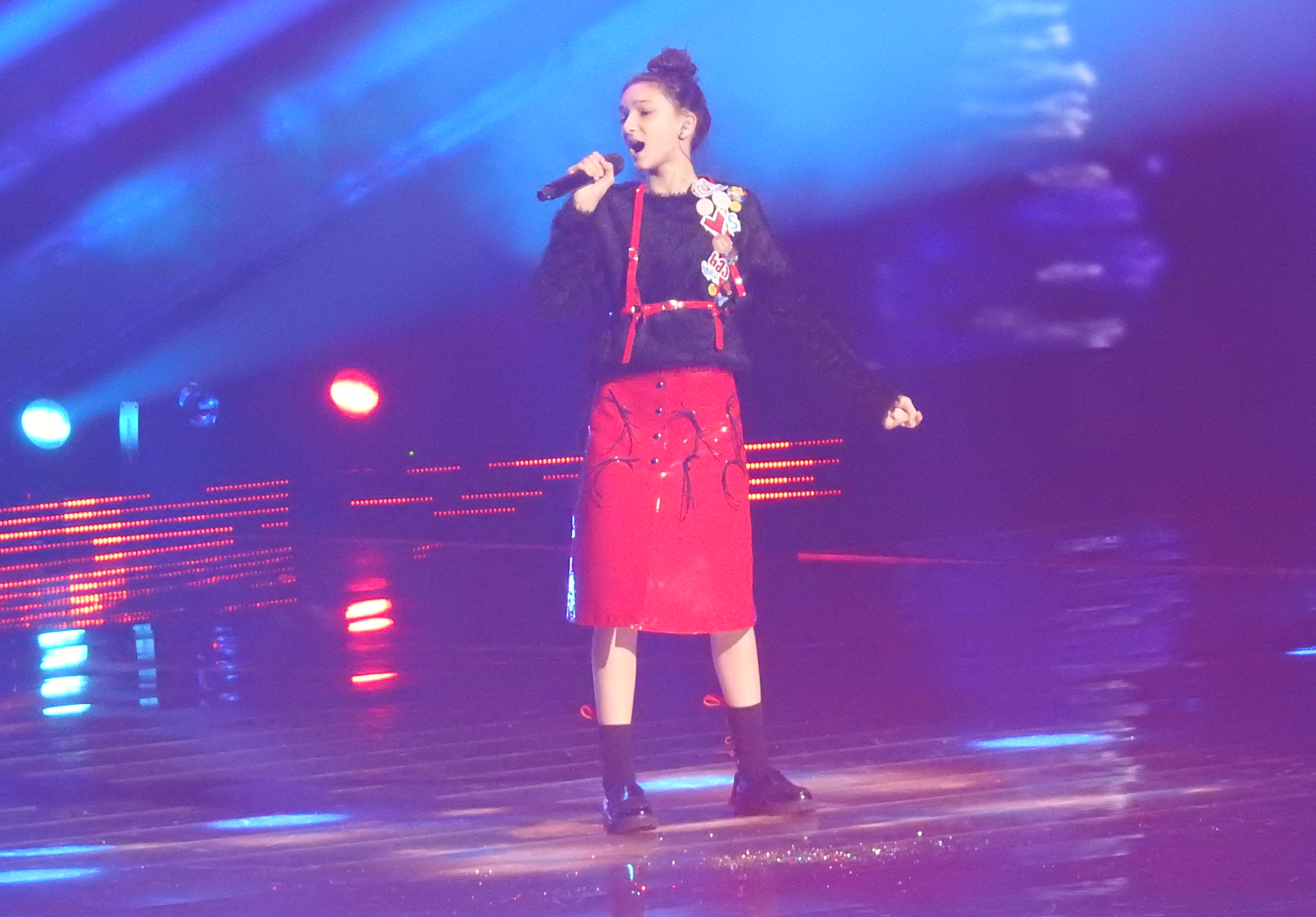
Tamar Edilashvili in Minsk (2018)

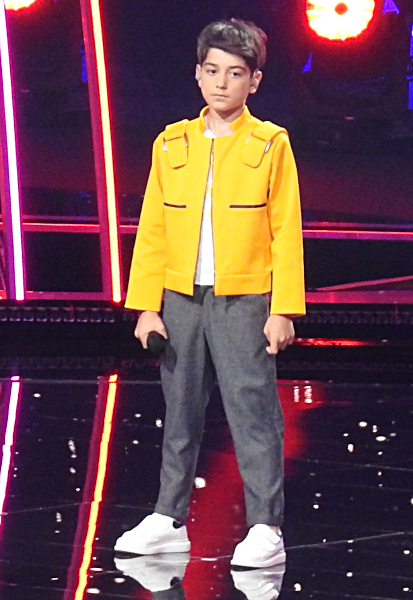
Giorgi Rostiashvili in Gliwice (2019)

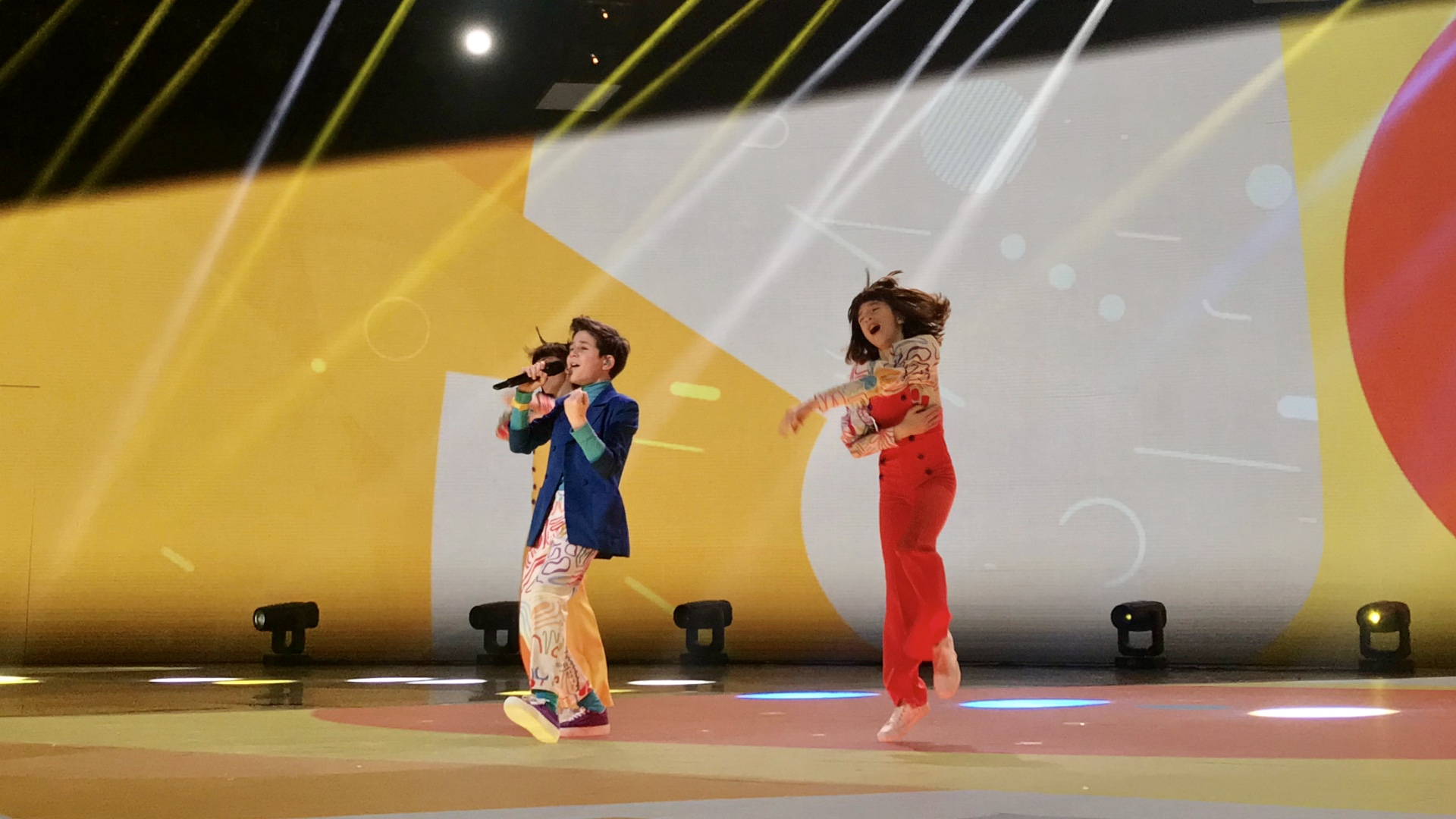
Niko Kajaia in Paris (2021)

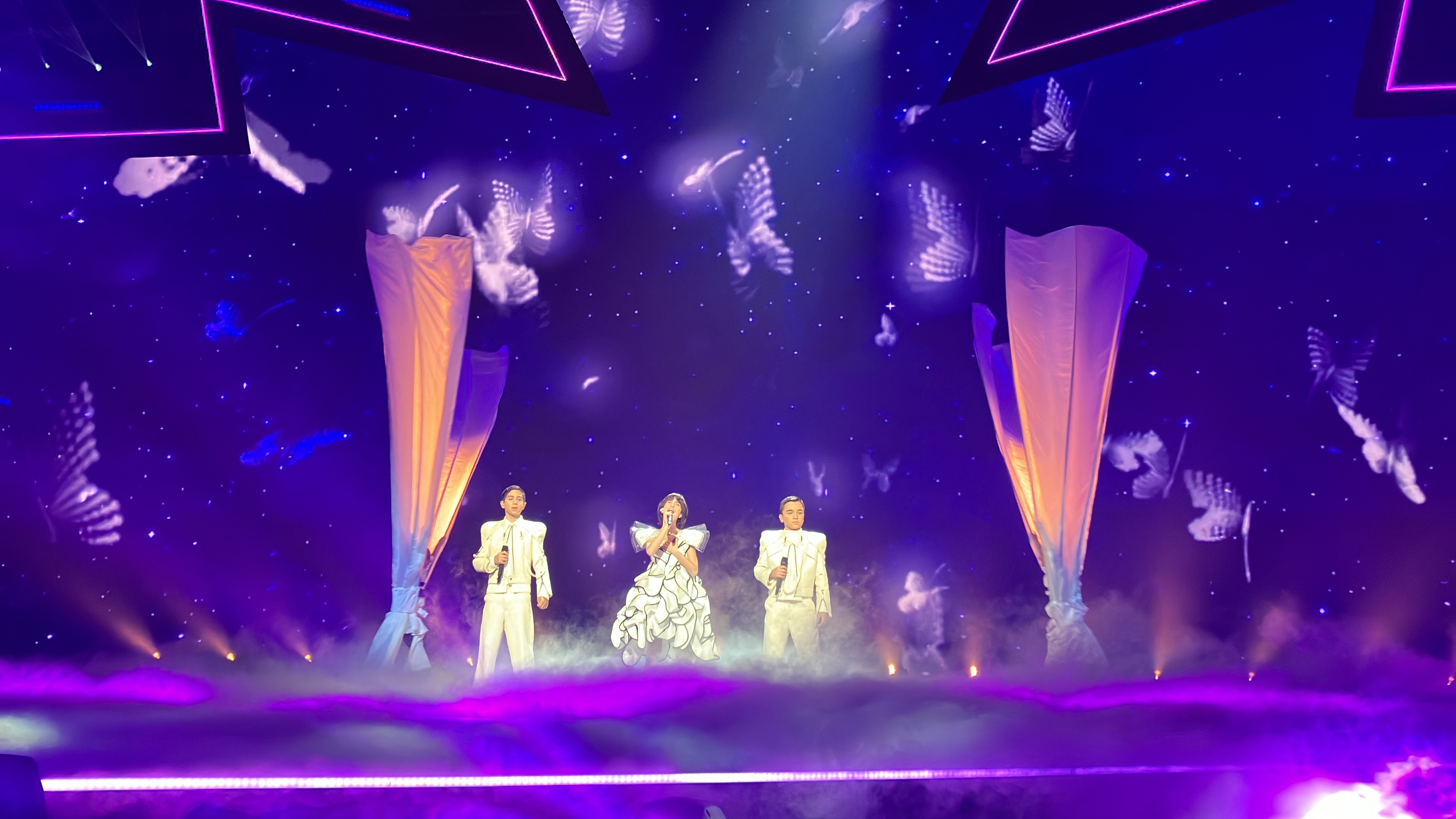
Anastasia and Ranina in Nice (2023)

== See also ==
- Georgia in the Eurovision Song Contest – Senior version of the Junior Eurovision Song Contest.
