= XHSBE-FM =

Radio station in San Andrés Cholula, Puebla

San Bernardino Tlaxcalancingo, San Andrés Cholula, Puebla; Mexico
- Frequency: 107.1 FM
- Branding: Cholollan Radio Comunitaria

Programming
- Format: Indigenous community radio

Ownership
- Owner: Comunidades Indígenas de San Bernardino Tlaxcalancingo y Santa María Zacatepec

History
- First air date: October 12, 2016 (social indigenous concession)
- Call sign meaning: San BErnardino Tlaxcalancingo

Technical information
- Class: A
- ERP: 750 watts
- HAAT: 197.2 m
- Transmitter coordinates: 19°04′27.71″N 98°20′49.48″W

Links
- Website: www.fmcholollan.org.mx

XHSBE-FM is a community radio station on 107.1 FM owned by and serving the indigenous communities of San Bernardino Tlaxcalancingo and Santa María Zacatepec from studios in San Andrés Cholula, Puebla, Mexico. It is known as FM Cholollan.

== History ==
XHSBE traces its origins to separate pirate radio stations in Tlaxcalancingo, located in the municipality of San Andrés Cholula, and Santa María Zacatepec, in Juan C. Bonilla Municipality. Pirate radio stations, however, are subject to seizure and forced closure. Axocotzin Radio, which had operated in Tlaxcalancingo since 2009 as an Internet radio station and on FM since 2011, was closed by representatives of the Federal Telecommunications Institute (IFT) on August 4, 2014. That same day, Radio Zacatepec in Santa María Zacatepec was shuttered. On May 30, 2015, Radio Zacatepec was forcibly closed for the second time in less than a year, having operated for just under two years.

Recognizing the need to obtain a broadcast concession to make the station legal but also the limited availability of frequencies, the two former stations combined in order to pursue the goal of receiving full approval to serve the municipalities in the shadow of Popocatépetl. Local residents demanded a new indigenous radio station be set up in the area, noting that stations from the Puebla metropolitan area did not pay attention to indigenous culture and issues.

After initially being denied due to an alleged lack of spectrum, in July 2016, the IFT made history by awarding two social indigenous concessions, the first for broadcast use: one to the indigenous communities of San Bernardino Tlaxcalancingo and Santa María Zacatepec, and the other for XHJP-FM, a pre-existing station in Oaxaca. The new XHSBE-FM would broadcast on 107.1 MHz, being among the first stations designated in the new reserved band for social community and indigenous stations.

XHSBE was initially approved to broadcast from a tower located on Cerro Tlacuaquilo in the community of San Francisco Coapa, located in San Andrés Cholula. In 2019, it relocated to Cerro Zapotecas.
