= Mariam Mamadashvili =

Georgian singer (born 2005)

Mariam Mamadashvili მარიამ მამადაშვილი
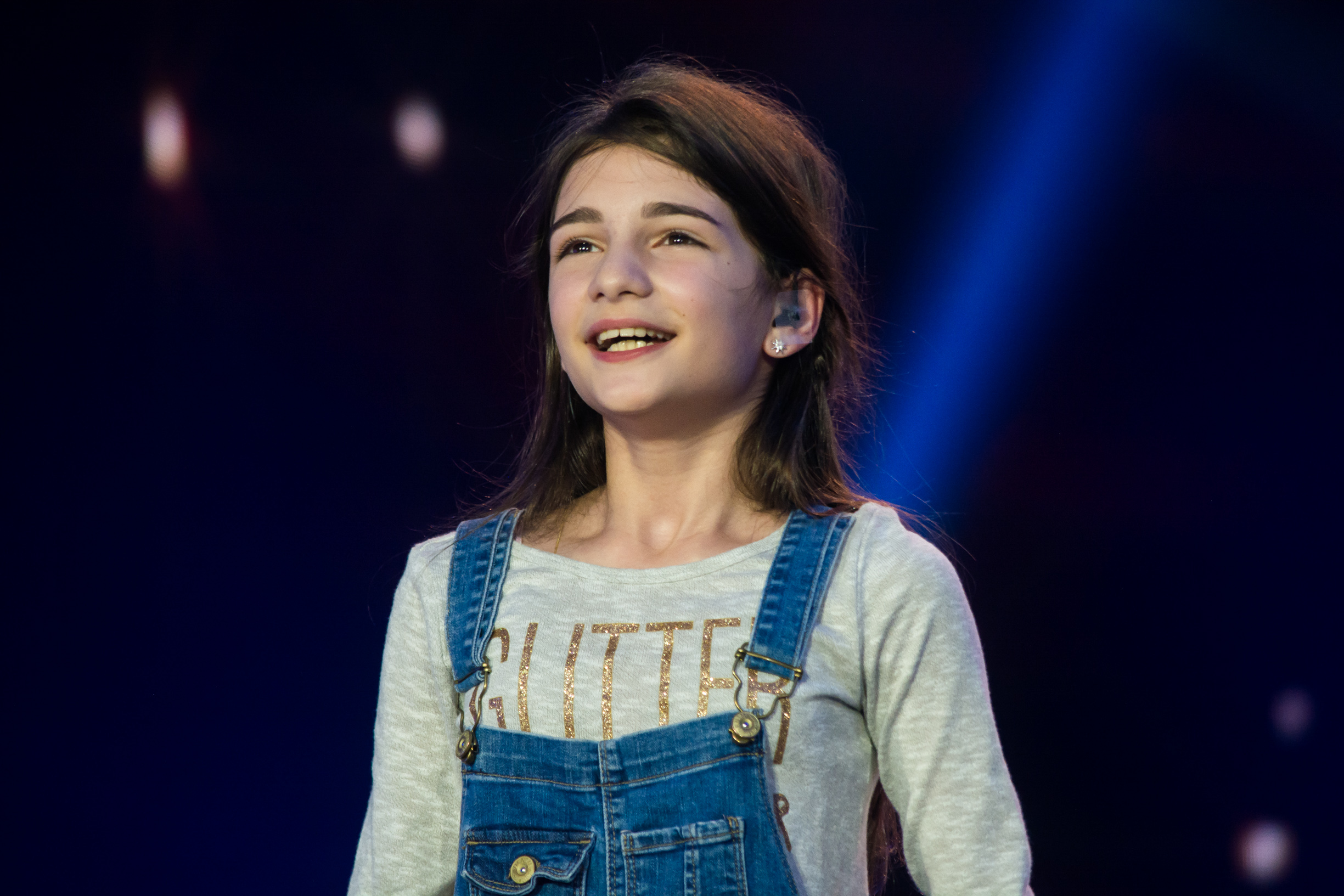
- Mamadashvili in 2016

Background information
- Born: 16 November 2005 (age 20); Tbilisi, Georgia
- Genres: Pop; R&B; jazz
- Occupation: Singer
- Instrument: Vocals
- Years active: 2010–present

Mariam Mamadashvili (Georgian: მარიამ მამადაშვილი, born 16 November 2005) is a Georgian singer. She won the Junior Eurovision Song Contest 2016 where she represented Georgia with the song "Mzeo". She moved to the United States in 2015.

== Biography ==
Mamadashvili has been performing since she was four years old. She studied at the Bzikebistudio in Georgia and also the Evgeni Mikeladze State Central Music School. Since moving to the United States, she has been enrolled at Tomlinson Middle School and Broadway Method Academy, and resides in Fairfield, Connecticut.

In 2022, at the Junior Eurovision Song Contest 2022 in Yerevan, Armenia, she was the spokesperson for North Macedonia.

She graduated from Fairfield Warde High School in 2023, and is currently attending Sacred Heart University, where she is majoring in business.

== Discography ==
Title	Year	Album
"The Butterfly"	2014	Non-album single
"Mzeo”	2016	Non-album single
"Circles"	2017	Non-album single
"This Is Our Day"	2022	Non-album single

Awards and achievements
Preceded by The Virus with "Gabede"	Georgia in the Junior Eurovision Song Contest; 2016	Succeeded by Grigol Kipshidze with "Voice of the Heart"
Preceded by (Malta) Destiny Chukunyere with "Not My Soul"	Winner of the Junior Eurovision Song Contest; 2016	Succeeded by (Russia) Polina Bogusevich with "Wings"
