= KVMC =

- Colorado City, Texas; United States
- Frequency: 1320 kHz
- Branding: Real Country

Programming
- Format: country music
- Affiliations: Citadel Broadcasting

Ownership
- Owner: Pete Garcia, Jr.; (Extreme Media, LLC)
- Sister stations: KAUM

Technical information
- Licensing authority: FCC
- Facility ID: 30102
- Class: D
- Power: 1,000 watts day
- Transmitter coordinates: 32°23′15.00″N 100°53′33.00″W

Links
- Public license information: Public file; LMS
- Webcast: Listen live
- Website: kvmckaum.blogspot.com

KVMC (1320 AM, Real Country) is a radio station broadcasting a country music music format. Licensed to Colorado City, Texas, United States, the station is currently owned by Pete Garcia, Jr., through licensee Extreme Media, LLC, and features programming from Citadel Broadcasting.
