= XHCLO-FM =

Radio station in Monclova, Coahuila, Mexico

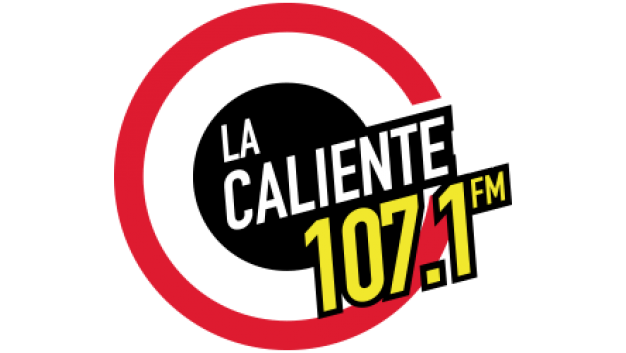
- Monclova, Coahuila; Mexico
- Frequency: 107.1 MHz
- Branding: La Caliente

Programming
- Format: Regional Mexican

Ownership
- Owner: Multimedios Radio; (Multimedios Radio, S.A. de C.V.)

History
- First air date: March 14, 1997 (concession)
- Call sign meaning: Monclova

Technical information
- Licensing authority: CRT
- Class: B1
- ERP: 50 kW
- HAAT: 73.6 m (241 ft)

Links
- Webcast: Listen live
- Website: mmradio.com

XHCLO-FM is a radio station on 107.1 FM in Monclova, Coahuila, Mexico. It is owned by Multimedios Radio and carries its La Caliente Regional Mexican format.

== History ==
XHCLO received its concession on March 14, 1997. It was owned by Multimedios Radio subsidiary Televideo Mexicana, S.A. de C.V.

On November 23, 2022, Multimedios and NRT México, owner of XHWGR-FM 101.1 and XHEMF-FM 96.3 as well as a local cable television channel, reached an agreement by which NRT would acquire XHCLO-FM and XHMTCO-TDT, the local Canal 6 transmitter, taking immediate possession of the facilities. However, the sale of NRT never carried out.
