= KRXB =

Coordinates: 28.4032°N 97.7477°W

- Beeville, Texas; United States
- Frequency: 107.1 MHz
- Branding: Dale' 107.1

Programming
- Format: Tejano

Ownership
- Owner: Scarlet Begonia Productions, Inc.
- Sister stations: KOUL

History
- First air date: 1988 (as KYTX at 97.9)
- Former call signs: KHBX (9/1988-10/1988); KYTX (1988–2002)
- Former frequencies: 97.9 MHz (1988–2002)

Technical information
- Licensing authority: FCC
- Facility ID: 36020
- Class: A
- ERP: 1,500 watts
- HAAT: 102.8 meters (337 ft)

Links
- Public license information: Public file; LMS
- Website: 1071krxb.com

KRXB (107.1 FM) is a radio station licensed to Beeville, Texas. The station broadcasts a tejano format and is owned by Scarlet Begonia Productions, Inc.

== History ==
As of August 1, 2015, KRXB ownership TexKan Communications, LLC leased all broadcast hours to Easton-Mark Media Group, with an option to buy the facility at a later date. This has resulted in KRXB dropping its classic rock format as "The Classic Rock Station", and becoming "Texas 107". The new format features country hits from the early 1990s to current.

On February 1, 2016, KRXB returned to a classic rock format.

Effective August 11, 2017, TexKan Communications sold KRXB to Scarlet Begonia Productions, Inc. for $215,000. On August 14, 2017, KRXB changed their format from classic rock to tejano, branded as "Dale' 107.1".
