= KCNY =

- Greenbrier, Arkansas; United States
- Broadcast area: Conway, Arkansas
- Frequency: 107.1 MHz
- Branding: Y107.1

Programming
- Format: Country music
- Affiliations: Premiere Networks; Westwood One

Ownership
- Owner: Crain Media Group, LLC

History
- First air date: December 12, 2002
- Former call signs: KKSY (1984–2005)
- Call sign meaning: K CoNwaY

Technical information
- Licensing authority: FCC
- Facility ID: 31452
- Class: C3
- ERP: 12,500 watts
- HAAT: 142.0 meters (465.9 ft)
- Transmitter coordinates: 35°17′47″N 92°19′11″W

Links
- Public license information: Public file; LMS
- Webcast: http://107.182.234.197:7564/stream
- Website: Official website

KCNY (107.1 FM, My Country 107.1) is a radio station broadcasting a country music format. Licensed to Greenbrier, Arkansas, United States. The station is currently owned by Crain Media Group, LLC.

== History ==
On December 12, 2002, the station was sold to Caldwell Broadcasting and on January 21, 2004, the station was sold to Crain Media Group.

Former logo
