= Chicago Independent Radio Project =

US non-profit organization

The Chicago Independent Radio Project (CHIRP) is a non-profit organization that operates a community radio station, CHIRP Radio. CHIRP is a non-profit 501(c)(3) organization funded primarily through individual donations, special event revenues, and grant support.

== History ==
From 2007 to 2010, CHIRP partnered with organizations across the country to get licenses from Federal Communications Commission for a low power FM radio in urban areas. In 2009, CHIRP's president and vice president, Shawn Campbell and Jenny Lizak, were invited to the White House to discuss the issue of expanding low power FM radio with President Obama's technology team. The bill CHIRP worked on was the Local Community Radio Act, which was signed into law in early 2011.

On January 17, 2010, CHIRP started an online radio station. The first song played was "Thank You Friends" by the band Big Star.

In June 2011, CHIRP Radio was named "Best Overall Radio Station" by the Chicago Reader in its annual Best of Chicago issue.

In November 2013, CHIRP submitted its broadcast license application for low-power FM.

In late 2014, CHIRP constructed a low power FM broadcast outlet in Chicago's north side. In October 2017, the organization launched its broadcast at 107.1 MHz with the call letters "WCXP-LP".
