= DWEE =

D'Ani Kita Radio (DWEE)
- Magalang; Philippines
- Broadcast area: Northern Pampanga, parts of Tarlac
- Frequency: 107.1 MHz
- Branding: DWEE 107.1 D'Ani Kita Radio

Programming
- Languages: Kapampangan, Filipino
- Format: Community radio

Ownership
- Owner: Department of Agriculture

History
- First air date: May 2021

Technical information
- Licensing authority: NTC
- Power: 1,000 watts

DWEE (107.1 FM) D'Ani Kita Radio is a radio station owned and operated by the Department of Agriculture. Its studio and transmitter are located inside the Pampanga State Agricultural University campus, Magalang.
