= DXHD =

Philippine radio station

Max FM Digos (DXHD)
Digos; Philippines
- Broadcast area: Davao del Sur and surrounding areas
- Frequency: 107.1 MHz
- Branding: 107.1 Max FM

Programming
- Languages: Cebuano, Filipino
- Format: News/Talk

Ownership
- Owner: Christian Media Management

History
- First air date: June 2022
- Former frequencies: 99.1 (June 2022-December 2024); 97.5 (February-August 2025)
- Call sign meaning: Hope Davao

Technical information
- Licensing authority: NTC
- Power: 1 kW

DXHD (107.1 FM), broadcasting as 107.1 Max FM, is an FM station owned and operated by Christian Media Management, a subsidiary of Laforteza Group of Companies. Its studios and transmitter are located at Ramon Magsaysay St., Digos.
