= KSRT =

Radio station in Cloverdale, California

Cloverdale, California; United States
- Broadcast area: Santa Rosa, California
- Frequency: 107.1 MHz
- Branding: Radio Lazer 107.1

Programming
- Format: Regional Mexican
- Affiliations: G1 creative, Ltd

Ownership
- Owner: Lazer Media; (Lazer Licenses, LLC)

History
- First air date: 2002
- Former call signs: KBPC (August–September 1999)

Technical information
- Licensing authority: FCC
- Facility ID: 52879
- Class: A
- ERP: 3,500 watts
- HAAT: 131 meters (430 ft)
- Transmitter coordinates: 38°48′34″N 123°2′56″W

Links
- Public license information: Public file; LMS
- Webcast: Listen Live
- Website: radiolazer.com/index.php/santa-rosa

KSRT (107.1 FM) is a commercial radio station broadcasting a Regional Mexican radio format. Licensed to Cloverdale, California, United States, it serves the Santa Rosa area. The station is currently owned by Lazer Media.
