= 2AAA =

Wagga Wagga, New South Wales, Australia; Australia
- Frequency: FM: 107.1 MHz Wagga Wagga

Ownership
- Owner: Wagga Wagga Community Media Incorporated

History
- First air date: 31 July 1981
- Call sign meaning: 2 = NSW; Accessible, Accountable, Alternative

Technical information
- Class: Community
- Power: 500 Watts
- Transmitter coordinates: 35.128385°S 147.374039°E
- Repeaters: FM: 97.9 MHz Junee; FM: 99.1 MHz Coolamon; FM: 99.1 MHz Gundagai; FM: 107.1 MHz Wagga Wagga; FM: 107.9 MHz Wagga Wagga

Links
- Website: Triple A FM

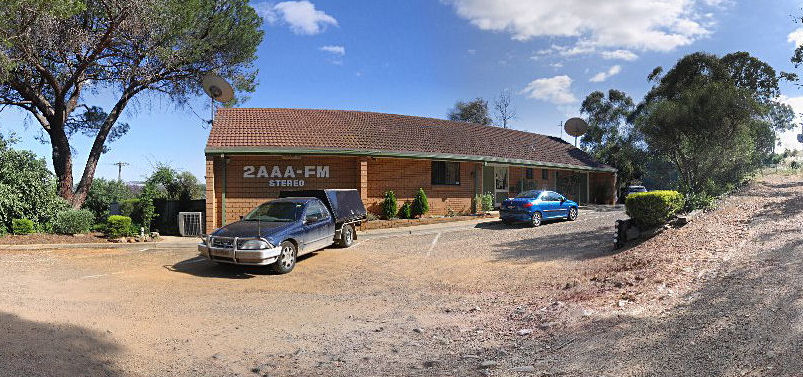
2AAA broadcast studio

2AAA (also known as Triple A FM) is a community radio station operated by Wagga Wagga Community Media Incorporated in Wagga Wagga, New South Wales, Australia broadcasting on FM 107.1 MHz.

The station was officially opened on 31 July 1981 and celebrated 25 years of continuous broadcasting in 2006. The station was rebranded to Triple A FM in 2018.
