= KFNV-FM =

- Ferriday, Louisiana; United States
- Broadcast area: Natchez micropolitan area
- Frequency: 107.1 MHz
- Branding: 107.1 The River

Programming
- Format: Classic hits

Ownership
- Owner: James Allgood; (Miss Lou Media, LLC)
- Sister stations: KWTG

History
- First air date: 1972; 54 years ago
- Call sign meaning: K Ferriday Natchez Vidalia

Technical information
- Licensing authority: FCC
- Facility ID: 67289
- Class: C3
- ERP: 18,500 watts
- HAAT: 71 meters (233 ft)
- Transmitter coordinates: 31°36′8″N 91°32′27″W

Links
- Public license information: Public file; LMS

KFNV-FM (107.1 FM, "The River") is a radio station broadcasting a classic hits music format. Licensed to Ferriday, Louisiana, United States, the station is owned by James Allgood, through licensee Miss-Lou Media, LLC, and is operated by Miss-Lou Media and their sister-company, Mid-South Broadcasting.

On April 15, 2017, KFNV-FM changed their format from adult contemporary (branded as "The River") to classic hits, branded as "107.1 The Bridge".

As of 2020 under its new ownership of Miss-Lou Media, the station continues to focus mainly on classic hits and rock, but re-introduced "The River" branding seen prior to the format-change.
