= WLSM-FM =

- Louisville, Mississippi; United States
- Frequency: 107.1 MHz
- Branding: "The Refuge 107.1 WLSM-FM"

Programming
- Format: Variety

Ownership
- Owner: WH Properties, Inc.

Technical information
- Licensing authority: FCC
- Facility ID: 26238
- Class: C3
- ERP: 12,500 watts
- HAAT: 142 metres (466 ft)
- Transmitter coordinates: 33°07′20″N 89°01′7″W

Links
- Public license information: Public file; LMS
- Website: www.wlsm107.com

WLSM-FM (107.1 FM) is a radio station licensed to serve the community of Louisville, Mississippi. The station is owned by WH Properties, Inc., and airs a variety format.

The station was assigned the WLSM-FM call letters by the Federal Communications Commission on February 8, 1966.
