= DXYY =

Philippine radio station

Radyo Natin Kidapawan (DXYY)
- Kidapawan; Philippines
- Broadcast area: Eastern Cotabato
- Frequency: 107.1 MHz
- Branding: 107.1 Radyo Natin

Programming
- Languages: Cebuano, Filipino
- Format: Community radio
- Network: Radyo Natin

Ownership
- Owner: MBC Media Group

History
- First air date: 2002

Technical information
- Licensing authority: NTC
- Power: 1,000 watts

DXYY (107.1 FM), broadcasting as 107.1 Radyo Natin, is a radio station owned and operated by MBC Media Group. The station's studio and transmitter are located in Brgy. Nuangan, Kidapawan.
