= KSIL =

- Rincon, New Mexico; United States
- Broadcast area: Silver City/Las Cruces, New Mexico
- Frequency: 107.1 MHz
- Branding: Latin X 94.3

Programming
- Format: Bilingual rhythmic CHR

Ownership
- Owner: Debra Tolleson and Humberto Hernandez; (Rincon Ventures, LLC)

History
- First air date: 1986
- Former call signs: KWNM
- Former frequencies: 105.5 MHz (2002–2017)
- Call sign meaning: SILver City; Keep Spanish In LatinX

Technical information
- Licensing authority: FCC
- Facility ID: 87838
- Class: C1
- ERP: 2300 watts
- HAAT: 165 meters
- Transmitter coordinates: 32°41′44″N 107°3′51″W
- Translators: 94.3 K232FC (El Paso, Texas)) (94.3 MHz) K232GD (Dona Ana)

Links
- Public license information: Public file; LMS
- Website: latinx943.com

KSIL (107.1 FM) is a radio station licensed to serve Rincon, New Mexico. The station is owned by Debra Tolleson and Humberto Hernandez and licensed to Rincon Ventures, LLC. It airs a bilingual rhythmic CHR music format featuring an eclectic mix of music including Latin pop, Reggaeton.

The station was assigned the KSIL call letters by the Federal Communications Commission on January 7, 2007.
