= DXYZ-FM =

Radio station in Iligan, Philippines

DXYZ
- Iligan; Philippines
- Broadcast area: Lanao del Norte, parts of Lanao del Sur
- Frequency: 107.1 MHz

Programming
- Format: Silent

Ownership
- Owner: MBC Media Group
- Sister stations: 99.3 Yes FM

History
- First air date: February 13, 1995
- Last air date: 2021
- Former call signs: DXLS (1995–2017)
- Former names: Love Radio (1995–2021)

Technical information
- Licensing authority: NTC

DXYZ (107.1 FM) was a radio station owned and operated by MBC Media Group.

Last April 20, 2017, Love Radio was shut down by Iligan mayor Celso Regencia due to failure of former management to paying taxes. Weeks later, the station returned on the air under new management and new home in Marietta Tower in Poblacion. It went off the air sometime in 2021.
