= WTKF =

Radio station in Atlantic, North Carolina

- Atlantic, North Carolina; United States
- Broadcast area: Morehead City-New Bern-Jacksonville
- Frequency: 107.1 MHz
- Branding: "FM 107.1 WTKF"

Programming
- Format: Talk radio
- Affiliations: Fox News Radio; Compass Media Networks; Salem Radio Network; Westwood One

Ownership
- Owner: Atlantic Ridge Telecasters

History
- Former frequencies: 107.3 MHz (1992–2008)

Technical information
- Licensing authority: FCC
- Facility ID: 3146
- Class: C1
- ERP: 46,000 watts
- HAAT: 190 meters
- Transmitter coordinates: 34°53′1.00″N 76°30′22.30″W

Links
- Public license information: Public file; LMS
- Webcast: Listen Live
- Website: wtkf107.com

WTKF (107.1 FM) is a radio station broadcasting a talk radio format. Licensed to Atlantic, North Carolina, United States, it serves the Morehead City-New Bern-Jacksonville area. WTKF signed on in 1992 as North Carolina's first FM talk-formatted station. It grew from the now-defunct WBTB/1400, which was licensed to Beaufort, North Carolina. As the first radio station in North Carolina to broadcast a talk format on FM radio, it boasted the slogan "First In Talk". In 2002, WTKF began simulcasting its signal on Jacksonville, North Carolina's WJNC AM 1240. On January 22, 2008, WTKF shifted from its 7,000-watt signal at 107.3 FM to a more-powerful 46,000-watt signal at 107.1 FM. The station is currently owned by Atlantic Ridge Telecasters.
