= KOUJ-LP =

- Norman, Oklahoma; United States
- Frequency: 107.1 MHz
- Branding: The Rock Of Salvation

Programming
- Format: Christian Rock

Ownership
- Owner: Calvary Chapel Of Norman, Incorporated

History
- First air date: 2015

Technical information
- Licensing authority: FCC
- Facility ID: 195139
- Class: LP1
- ERP: 69 watts
- HAAT: 36 meters (118 ft)
- Transmitter coordinates: 35°13′19″N 97°26′29″W

Links
- Public license information: LMS
- Webcast: https://streamdb6web.securenetsystems.net/v5/KOUJ
- Website: http://kouj.org

KOUJ-LP (107.1 FM) is a low-power FM radio station licensed to Norman, Oklahoma, United States. The station is currently licensed to Calvary Chapel Of Norman, Incorporated and carries Christian Rock.

== History ==
The callsign was KOUJ-LP on April 16, 2015.
