= WLVZ =

K-Love radio station in Collins–Hattiesburg, Mississippi, United States

- Collins, Mississippi; United States
- Broadcast area: Hattiesburg
- Frequency: 103.7 MHz
- Branding: K-Love

Programming
- Language: English
- Network: K-Love

Ownership
- Owner: Educational Media Foundation

History
- First air date: August 15, 1978
- Former call signs: WKNZ (1978–2007)
- Former frequencies: 101.7 MHz (1978–1994); 107.1 MHz (1994-2024)

Technical information
- Licensing authority: FCC
- Facility ID: 63847
- Class: C2
- ERP: 10,500 watts
- HAAT: 323 meters (1,060 ft)
- Transmitter coordinates: 31°31′36.10″N 89°08′10.20″W

Links
- Public license information: Public file; LMS

WLVZ (103.7 FM, "K-Love") is a non-commercial radio station licensed to Collins, Mississippi, United States, serving the Hattiesburg, Mississippi area. The station serves as the Hattiesburg-area transmitter for the K-Love Christian radio network.

== History ==
On January 10, 1977, Covington County Broadcasters, Inc., filed for a new FM radio station on 101.7 MHz in Collins. The Federal Communications Commission granted the construction permit on February 13, 1978. The station went on air that August 15 and immediately adopted a format including country music during the day and adult contemporary in the afternoon and at night. Covington County Broadcasters was owned by Ottis Wolverton and operated by the Blakeney brothers. By 1984, however, WKNZ had gone all-country. Wolverton acquired WBKH in Hattiesburg in 1988. Both stations were sold the next year to Southern Air Communications, Inc., owned by Bruce Easterling, in a $648,000 transaction; the new owners flipped WKNZ to oldies as "Z-101" in the summer of 1990. In early 1993, the format was changed to free-form classic rock.

Financial problems grounded Southern Air in 1993. The Associated Press sued Southern Air that year for unpaid wire service bills in 1990. By that time, however, WKNZ's ownership was already in the process of changing, as Wolverton repurchased the FM outlet. Southern Air owed Covington County Broadcasters, the former licensee, $423,000. WKNZ's format was changed back to country that June.

As part of a reassignment of FM allotments in several Mississippi communities approved in 1991, WKNZ had been relocated to 107.1 MHz; the frequency change came into effect on August 26, 1994. This move allowed WKNZ to more than double its ERP, resulting in a greatly improved signal.

After the station was purchased by Thomas F. McDaniels under the name Sunbelt Broadcasting Corporation, WKNZ's format was changed to classic rock as "Zoo 107" on December 29, 1994. The station became a partner of the Hattiesburg Zoo, which was its new namesake; it sponsored the zoo's name-a-zebra contest in 1996.

Radio Broadcasters, L.L.C., controlled by Ken Rainey and owners of WMXI, acquired WKNZ and WXHB in 2000 for $690,000. The station's format remained unchanged until the station was sold in 2005 to the Educational Media Foundation and converted into a K-Love transmitter. The station immediately dropped its programming, including sports programming, on April 1, 2005. The station's call sign was changed to WLVZ in 2007.

WLVZ moved from 107.1 MHz to 103.7 MHz in November 2024 with no change in ERP or HAAT. 103.7 MHz became available when Hattiesburg station WFFX was relocated to New Orleans in October 2024. In July 2025, WLVZ improved its signal and became a maximized Class C2 station by changing the location of its transmitter and increasing its ERP and HAAT.
