= WOCO-FM =

- Oconto, Wisconsin; United States
- Broadcast area: Oconto County, Green Bay metro
- Frequency: 107.1 MHz
- Branding: The All Heart Radio

Programming
- Format: Easy listening

Ownership
- Owner: Lamardo Inc.
- Sister stations: WOCO

History
- First air date: August 1, 1968
- Call sign meaning: Oconto

Technical information
- Licensing authority: FCC
- Facility ID: 36465
- Class: A
- ERP: 3,000 watts
- HAAT: 64 meters (210 ft)
- Transmitter coordinates: 44°53′31″N 87°57′18″W

Links
- Public license information: Public file; LMS
- Website: wocoradio.com

WOCO-FM (107.1 FM) is a radio station broadcasting an easy listening format. Licensed to Oconto, Wisconsin, United States, the station serves Oconto County and the northern part of the Green Bay metropolitan area. The station is currently owned by Lamardo Inc.
