= DYXC =

Radio station in Ormoc, Philippines

Radyo Natin Ormoc (DYXC)
- Ormoc; Philippines
- Broadcast area: Northwestern Leyte
- Frequency: 107.1 MHz
- Branding: 107.1 Radyo Natin

Programming
- Languages: Waray, Filipino
- Format: Community radio
- Network: Radyo Natin

Ownership
- Owner: MBC Media Group

History
- First air date: 2003
- Former names: Hot FM (2003-2016)
- Call sign meaning: Roman number for 90

Technical information
- Licensing authority: NTC
- Power: 1,000 watts

Links
- Website: radyonatinfm.com/ormoc/

DYXC (107.1 FM), broadcasting as 107.1 Radyo Natin, is a radio station owned and operated by MBC Media Group. The station's studio is located at the 3rd Floor, Lam Bldg., Corner Mabini St. cor. Carlos Tan St., Ormoc.
