= DWJS =

Radyo Natin Virac (DWJS)
- Virac; Philippines
- Broadcast area: Catanduanes, parts of Camarines Sur
- Frequency: 107.1 MHz
- Branding: Radyo Natin 107.1

Programming
- Languages: Bicolano, Filipino
- Format: Community radio
- Network: Radyo Natin Network

Ownership
- Owner: MBC Media Group; (Pacific Broadcasting System)

History
- First air date: 1997

Technical information
- Licensing authority: NTC
- Power: 1 kW

107.1 Radyo Natin (DWJS 107.1 MHz) is an FM station owned and operated by MBC Media Group. Its studios and transmitter are located at 4th Floor, Catanduanes College Bldg., Brgy. Salvacion, Virac, Catanduanes.
