= WZMO-LP =

- Marion, Ohio; United States
- Frequency: 107.1 MHz
- Branding: Marion Community Radio

Programming
- Format: Community radio

Ownership
- Owner: Marion Community Radio

History
- First air date: 2014
- Former frequencies: 107.5 MHz (2014–2017); 104.7 MHz (2017–2024)

Technical information
- Licensing authority: FCC
- Facility ID: 195387
- Class: L1
- ERP: 100 watts
- HAAT: 18 meters (59 ft)
- Transmitter coordinates: 40°36′14″N 83°16′48″W

Links
- Public license information: LMS
- Webcast: Listen live
- Website: wzmofm.com

WZMO-LP (107.1 FM) is a radio station licensed to serve the community of Marion, Ohio. The station, which is owned by Marion Community Radio, began broadcasting in 2014.

The station was assigned the WZMO-LP call sign by the Federal Communications Commission on May 12, 2014.
