= KAUM =

- Colorado City, Texas; United States
- Frequency: 107.1 MHz
- Branding: Real Country

Programming
- Format: Country
- Affiliations: ABC Radio

Ownership
- Owner: Pete Garcia, Jr.; (Extreme Media, LLC)
- Sister stations: KVMC

Technical information
- Licensing authority: FCC
- Facility ID: 30101
- Class: A
- ERP: 3,000 watts
- HAAT: 48.0 meters (157.5 ft)
- Transmitter coordinates: 32°23′15″N 100°53′33″W

Links
- Public license information: Public file; LMS

KAUM (107.1 FM, "Real Country") is a radio station broadcasting a country music format. Licensed to Colorado City, Texas, United States, the station is currently owned by Pete Garcia, Jr., through licensee Extreme Media, LLC, and features programming from ABC Radio.
