= CJFI-FM =

First Nations community radio station in Ontario

Coordinates: 51°15′43″N 80°35′50″W

CJFI-FM is a First Nations non-profit community radio station operating at 107.1 MHz (FM) in Moose Factory, Ontario, Canada. The station is branded as The Island-Youth Radio.

== History ==
The station started broadcasting in the fall of 2011. The radio station was conceived as a youth program inside the youth centre to provide them with the opportunity to learn radio broadcasting, and in doing so, they would have a creative outlet for any ideas or concepts in media. Being a non-profit community radio station means that The Island also accepts volunteers from the surrounding communities of Moose Factory and Moosonee. CJFI-FM is officially owned by Moose Cree First Nation, but has been associated with the Moose River Broadcasting Association. CJFI 107.1 The Island also streams online through the online streaming service MIXLR via its website and through Moose Cree First Nations home page. The radio station transmits at 50 watts with a 7 km radius. The Island currently broadcasts from the John R. Delaney Youth Centre in Moose Factory.
