= WLJZ-LP =

- Salisbury, North Carolina; United States
- Frequency: 107.1 MHz

Ownership
- Owner: (Livingstone College)

History
- First air date: 2017

Technical information
- Licensing authority: FCC
- Facility ID: 194366
- Class: FL
- ERP: 70 watts; 74.727 watts (CP)
- HAAT: 17.2 meters (56 ft); 34.6 meters (114 ft); (CP)
- Transmitter coordinates: 35°40′6.20″N 80°29′.90″W

Links
- Public license information: LMS
- Website: https://livingstone.edu/

WLJZ-LP (107.1 FM) is a low-power radio station. Licensed to Salisbury, North Carolina, United States, the station is owned by Livingstone College. The station was "deemed operational" December 7, 2017, but officially launched in February 2018. Programming includes information and discussions related to the college, community and music that includes jazz, Afro-Cuban, hip-hop, R&B fusion and gospel. Students work at the station, whose studios are in the W.J. Walls Center, and a major in communications is planned which would use the station.

College president Jimmy Jenkins was inspired to start WLJZ by his experience with helping start a station at Elizabeth City State University. Artists played on WLJZ include Marvin Gaye, Stevie Wonder and The Supremes. Students contribute a lot of the programming, but WLJZ remains on the air during the summer. In the future, sponsors may help to fund the station. One plan is to have professors at the college explain music as they play it. Although the signal only covers Salisbury, a new tower is planned that will provide more coverage to Rowan County.
