= WOCO (AM) =

- Oconto, Wisconsin; United States
- Frequency: 1260 kHz

Programming
- Format: Country music

Ownership
- Owner: Lamardo Inc.

History
- Call sign meaning: Oconto

Technical information
- Licensing authority: FCC
- Facility ID: 36466
- Class: D
- Power: 1,000 watts (day); 29 watts (night)
- Transmitter coordinates: 44°53′31″N 87°57′18″W

Links
- Public license information: Public file; LMS
- Website: wocoradio.com

WOCO (1260 AM) is a radio station broadcasting a country music format licensed to Oconto, Wisconsin, United States. The station is currently owned by Lamardo Inc.
