= KOGD-LP =

- Shawnee, Oklahoma; United States
- Broadcast area: Shawnee, Oklahoma
- Frequency: 107.1 MHz
- Branding: Oklahoma Catholic Radio

Programming
- Format: Catholic Religious

Ownership
- Owner: Benedictine Fathers Of Sacred Heart Mission, Inc.

History
- First air date: 2015

Technical information
- Licensing authority: FCC
- Facility ID: 194649
- Class: LP1
- ERP: 48 watts
- HAAT: 42.8 meters (140 ft)
- Transmitter coordinates: 35°22′3″N 96°57′14″W

Links
- Public license information: LMS
- Website: http://www.okcr.org

KOGD-LP (107.1 FM) is a low-power FM radio station licensed to Shawnee, Oklahoma, United States. The station is currently owned by Benedictine Fathers Of Sacred Heart Mission, Inc.

== History ==
The station call sign KOGD-LP on October 5, 2015.
