= WHFV (FM) =

Radio station in Shenandoah, Virginia

- Shenandoah, Virginia; United States
- Broadcast area: Shenandoah, Virginia; Elkton, Virginia
- Frequency: 107.1 MHz
- Branding: Holy Family Catholic Radio

Programming
- Format: Catholic religious
- Affiliations: EWTN Radio

Ownership
- Owner: Holy Family Communications

History
- First air date: November 24, 2014
- Call sign meaning: "Holy Family Virginia"

Technical information
- Licensing authority: FCC
- Facility ID: 184899
- Class: A
- ERP: 330 watts
- HAAT: −64.9 meters (−213 ft)
- Transmitter coordinates: 38°29′47.90″N 78°38′52.00″W

Links
- Public license information: Public file; LMS
- Webcast: Listen live (via iHeartRadio)
- Website: WHFV Online

WHFV is a Catholic religious formatted broadcast radio station licensed to Shenandoah, Virginia, serving Shenandoah and Elkton in Virginia. WHFV is owned and operated by Holy Family Communications. It has been assigned the WHFV call sign since September 25, 2014.
