= KCGW-LP =

- Edgar, Nebraska; United States
- Frequency: 107.1 MHz
- Branding: Cool Mix 107.1

Ownership
- Owner: Williams Life Radio

History
- First air date: January 22, 2014

Technical information
- Licensing authority: FCC
- Facility ID: 193292
- Class: L1
- ERP: 0.082 kw
- HAAT: 15.7 meters (51.509 feet)
- Transmitter coordinates: 40°22′37.80″N 97°58′13.90″W

Links
- Public license information: LMS

107.1 FM is a radio station broadcasting from Edgar, Nebraska. The station serves the rural farm communities of Clay, Nuckolls and Thayer counties. The station is also known as The Cool Mix 107.1. KCGW-LP 107.1 FM is under the ownership of Williams Life Radio of Edgar, Nebraska and operates as a not for profit organization. The station features a mix of genres and syndicate programming. Bringing community events and local news to the radio. The station has a variety of in studio musical guests.

KCGW-LP studio is located in Edgar, Nebraska.
