= KOFR-LP =

- Lander, Wyoming; United States
- Broadcast area: Lander
- Frequency: 107.1 MHz

Programming
- Format: Religious

Ownership
- Owner: Church of the Holy Rosary

History
- First air date: 2015

Technical information
- Licensing authority: FCC
- Facility ID: 194424
- Class: L1
- ERP: 100 watts
- HAAT: −25.21 meters (−82.7 ft)
- Transmitter coordinates: 42°49′15″N 108°45′53″W

Links
- Public license information: LMS

KOFR-LP (107.1 FM) is a low-power FM radio station broadcasting a Religious format. Licensed to Lander, Wyoming, United States, the station is currently owned by Church of the Holy Rosary.
