= WITB-LP =

- Benton, Kentucky; United States
- Frequency: 107.1 MHz

Ownership
- Owner: Benton Church of Christ, Inc

Technical information
- Licensing authority: FCC
- Facility ID: 134179
- Class: L1
- ERP: 59 watts
- HAAT: 39.0 meters
- Transmitter coordinates: 36°48′59.00″N 88°20′54.00″W

Links
- Public license information: LMS

WITB-LP (107.1 FM) is a radio station licensed to Benton, Kentucky, United States. The station is currently owned by Benton Church of Christ, Inc.
