= 1992 in Nordic music =

The following is a list of notable events and releases that happened in Nordic music in 1992.

== Events ==
- "Early in the year" – Opeth's founder and vocalist David Isberg leaves the band, citing "creative differences".
- 10 April – On the first day of Norway's 19th Vossajazz festival, Dag Arnesen is awarded the festival prize.
- 9 May – The 1992 Eurovision Song Contest is held at Malmö Isstadion in Malmö, Sweden, and is won by Ireland. Iceland, finishing in 7th place, is the best-performing of the Scandinavian countries.
- 20 August–6 September – The Helsinki Festival takes the theme theme: Music of the Baltics (orchestral and chamber-music concerts, opera productions, song recitals, ballet, theater, jazz, pop, and rock concerts).
- 21 September – PolyGram add a crown emblem to the ABBA logo to coincide with the release of ABBA Gold: Greatest Hits.
- unknown date – The newly founded Chi Mei Museum in Taiwan acquires a 1744 violin, possibly the last one ever made by Giuseppe Guarneri, formerly used by Ole Bull.

== Classical works ==
- Torstein Aagaard-Nilsen – Arctic Landscape for Military Band
- Vagn Holmboe – Svaerm for string quartet
- Ingvar Lidholm – Ett drömspel (opera)
- Jukka Linkola – Elina (opera)
- Aulis Sallinen – Kullervo (opera)

== Film and TV scores ==
- Gunner Møller Pedersen – Kærlighedens smerte

== Hit singles ==
- Ace of Base – "All That She Wants" (#1 Australia, Austria, Belgium, Denmark, Germany, Greece, Iceland, Italy, Spain, UK)
- J. Karjalainen – "Telepatiaa" (#1 Finland)
- Kim Larsen – "Leningrad" (#1 Denmark)
- Moogetmoogs – "Kolmen minuutin muna" (#1 Finland)
- Orup – "Stockholm" (#1 Sweden)
- Popeda – "Kersantti Karoliina" (#1 Finland)
- Roxette – "How Do You Do!" (#1 Norway; #2 Denmark, Finland, Sweden)
- Neljä Ruusua – "Juppihippipunkkari" (#1 Finland)
- Mauro Scocco – "Om du var min" (#1 Sweden)

== Eurovision Song Contest ==
- Denmark in the Eurovision Song Contest 1992
- Finland in the Eurovision Song Contest 1992
- Iceland in the Eurovision Song Contest 1992
- Norway in the Eurovision Song Contest 1992
- Sweden in the Eurovision Song Contest 1992

== Births ==
- 28 January – Simone Egeriis, Danish singer
- 31 January – Christopher Nissen, Danish singer
- 3 July – Molly Sandén, Swedish singer

== Deaths ==
- 27 March – Harald Sæverud, Norwegian composer (born 1897)
- 28 March – Elisabeth Granneman, Norwegian singer, songwriter, children's writer and actress (born 1930).
- 30 April – Toivo Kärki, Finnish composer, arranger and music producer (born 1915)
- 30 May – Karl-Erik Welin, Swedish organist, pianist and composer (born 1934)
- 3 August – Finn Ludt, Norwegian organist, pianist and harpsichordist (born 1918)
- 15 December – Otto Lington, Danish violinist, jazz bandleader and composer (born 1903)
