= Why Me? (Linda Martin song) =

1992 song by Linda Martin

Single by Linda Martin
- B-side: "Shades Of Blue"
- Released: 1992
- Label: Columbia
- Songwriter: Seán Sherrard

Eurovision Song Contest 1992 entry
- Country: Ireland
- Artist: Linda Martin
- Language: English
- Composer: Seán Sherrard
- Lyricist: Seán Sherrard
- Conductor: Noel Kelehan

Finals performance
- Final result: 1st
- Final points: 155

Entry chronology
- ◄ "Could It Be That I'm in Love" (1991)
- "In Your Eyes" (1993) ►

Official performance video
- "Why Me?" on YouTube

"Why Me?" is a 1992 song recorded by an Irish singer Linda Martin written by Seán Sherrard. It represented Ireland in the Eurovision Song Contest 1992 held in Malmö, winning the contest.

== Background ==
=== Conception ===
"Why Me?" is a song written by Seán Sherrard –better known as Johnny Logan– for Linda Martin. He had previously won the Eurovision Song Contest performing "What's Another Year" and the self-composed "Hold Me Now" –in 1980 and 1987 respectively– both representing Ireland.

"Why Me?" is a ballad, building in intensity towards the end. The singer describes her thoughts about her lover and asks why she is the lucky one to have his love, as against anyone else.

=== Eurovision ===
On 29 March 1992, "Why Me?" performed by Martin competed in the national selection organised by Raidió Teilifís Éireann (RTÉ) to select its song and performer for the 37th edition of the Eurovision Song Contest. The song won the competition so it became the Irish entrant –and Martin the performer– for Eurovision. This was the second time Martin would perform a song by Logan at Eurovision, after "Terminal 3" in 1984, where she placed second.

On 9 May 1992, the Eurovision Song Contest was held at the Malmö Isstadion in Malmö hosted by Sveriges Television (SVT), and broadcast live throughout the continent. Martin performed "Why Me?" seventeenth on the night, following the United Kingdom's "One Step Out of Time" by Michael Ball and preceding Denmark's "Alt det som ingen ser" by Kenny Lübcke & Lotte Nilsson. Noel Kelehan conducted the event's live orchestra in the performance of the Irish entry.

At the close of voting, the song had received 155 points, placing first in a field of twenty-three, and winning the contest. Logan is, to date, the only person to win the contest with a song composed for him, win the contest with his own song and then compose another winner. The song was succeeded in 1993 as winner by "In Your Eyes" by Niamh Kavanagh also representing Ireland.

=== Aftermath ===
In the Eurovision fiftieth anniversary competition Congratulations: 50 Years of the Eurovision Song Contest, held on 22 October 2005 in Copenhagen, Martin performed the song as part of the interval acts. On 31 March 2015, in the Eurovision sixtieth anniversary concert Eurovision Song Contest's Greatest Hits held in London, Logan performed the song as part of a medley with "Hold Me Now" and "What's Another Year".

== Charts ==
=== Weekly charts ===
Chart (1992)	Peak position
Belgium (Ultratop 50 Flanders)	21
Denmark (IFPI)	7
Europe (Eurochart Hot 100)	27
Ireland (IRMA)	1
Netherlands (Dutch Top 40)	23
Netherlands (Single Top 100)	29
Portugal (AFP)	7
UK Singles (Official Charts)	59

== Legacy ==
Logan covered the song on his 2001 album Reach for Me.

Preceded by "Fångad av en stormvind" by Carola	Eurovision Song Contest winners 1992	Succeeded by "In Your Eyes" by Niamh Kavanagh
