= Eurovision Song Contest 1992 =

International song competition

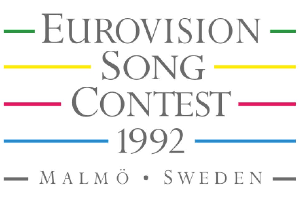

Date and venue
- Final: 9 May 1992
- Venue: Malmö Isstadion; Malmö, Sweden

Organisation
- Organiser: European Broadcasting Union (EBU)
- Scrutineer: Frank Naef

Production
- Host broadcaster: Sveriges Television (SVT)
- Director: Kåge Gimtell
- Executive producer: Ingvar Ernblad
- Musical director: Anders Berglund
- Presenters: Lydia Capolicchio; Harald Treutiger

Participants
- Number of entries: 23
- Returning countries: Netherlands
- Participation map: Competing countries Countries that participated in the past but not in 1992

Vote
- Voting system: Each country awarded 12, 10, 8-1 point(s) to their 10 favourite songs
- Winning song: Ireland "Why Me"

The Eurovision Song Contest 1992 was the 37th edition of the Eurovision Song Contest, held on 9 May 1992 at the Malmö Isstadion in Malmö, Sweden, and presented by Lydia Capolicchio and Harald Treutiger. It was organised by the European Broadcasting Union (EBU) and host broadcaster Sveriges Television (SVT), who staged the event after winning the 1991 contest for Sweden with the song "Fångad av en stormvind" by Carola.

Broadcasters from twenty-three countries participated in the contest – a new record number of participants – with the Netherlands returning to the contest following a one-year break to join the twenty-two countries which had participated in the previous year's event. This edition marked Yugoslavia's final appearance in the contest.

The winner was Ireland with the song "Why Me", written by Johnny Logan and performed by Linda Martin. This marked Ireland's fourth win, and brought songwriter Logan his third win overall, having previously won the contest in 1980 as singer and in 1987 as both singer and songwriter.
The United Kingdom, Malta, Italy, and Greece rounded out the top five, with the United Kingdom achieving its thirteenth second-place finish, while Malta and Greece achieved their best ever results up to this point. For the first time in the contest's history, the top three songs were all performed in English.

== Location ==
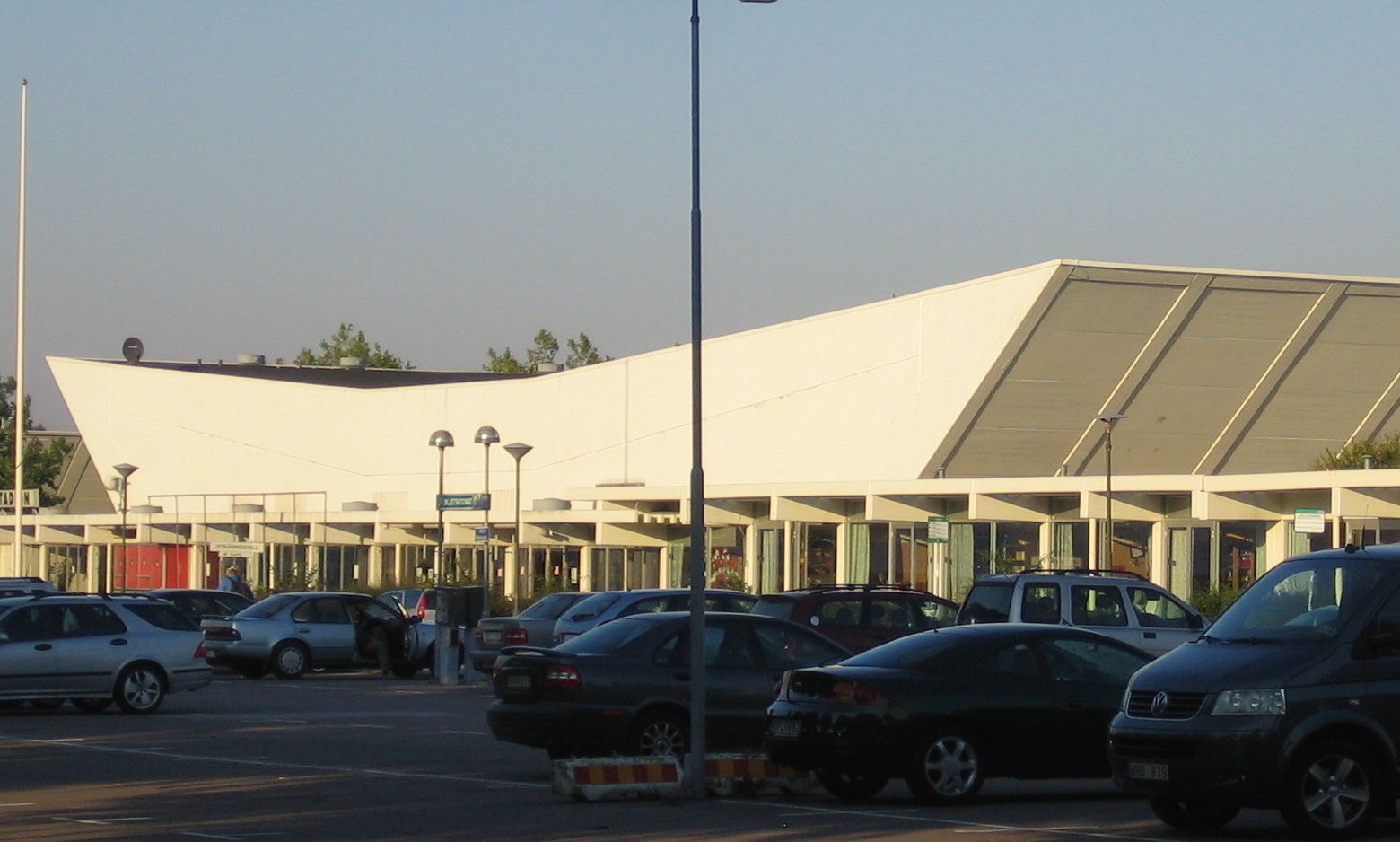
Malmö Isstadion, Malmö – host venue of the 1992 contest

The 1992 contest took place in Malmö, Sweden, following the country's victory at the 1991 contest with the song "Fångad av en stormvind", performed by Carola. It was the third time that Sweden had hosted the contest, following the 1975 and 1985 events held in Stockholm and Gothenburg respectively. The chosen venue was the Malmö Isstadion, normally used as an indoor ice hockey arena and up until 2008 the home stadium of the Malmö Redhawks ice hockey team. Constructed in 1970, the venue had also previously hosted concerts by Frank Sinatra and Julio Iglesias amongst others. With a typical capacity of 5,800 spectators for ice hockey matches, for the contest an audience of around 3,700 was present.

== Participants ==
Eurovision Song Contest 1992 – Participation summaries by country
- Austria; Belgium; Cyprus; Denmark; Finland; France; Germany; Greece; Iceland; Ireland; Israel; Italy; Luxembourg; Malta; Netherlands; Norway; Portugal; Spain; Sweden; Switzerland; Turkey; United Kingdom; Yugoslavia

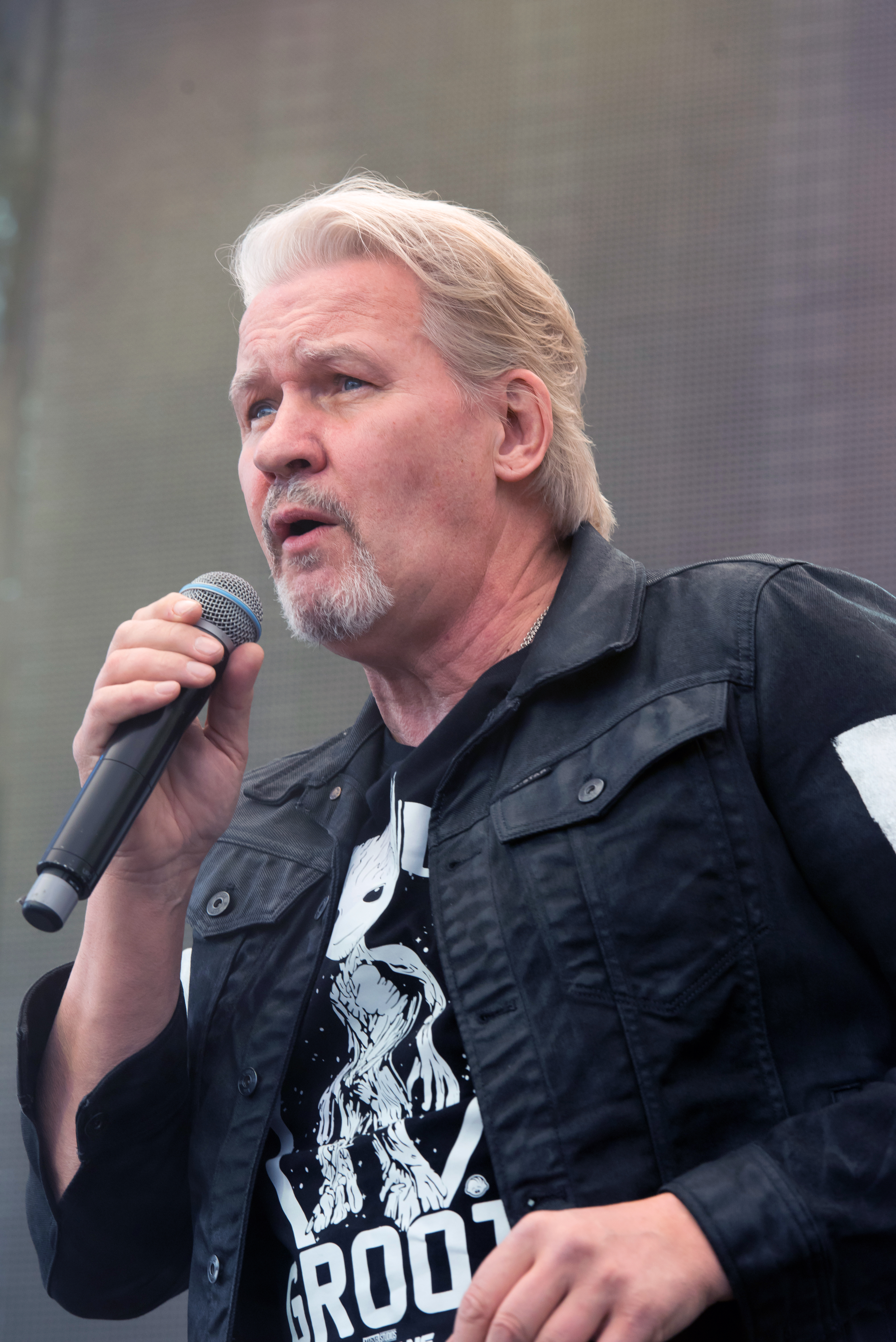
Two-time contest winner Johnny Logan (pictured in 2017) returned as the songwriter of the Irish entry.

With the Netherlands making a return to the contest after missing the previous year's contest, and Malta continuing to participate following its return to the event in 1991, twenty-three countries in total competed in the 1992 contest – a new contest record. Ahead of the 1991 event the Maltese broadcaster had been told by the contest organisers that they would only be allowed to remain in the competition if another nation dropped out of the event, however after placing sixth in the 1991 contest, the organisers instead decided to raise the maximum number of participating countries to twenty-three to make space for continued Maltese participation. The contest marked the final participation of Yugoslavia, whose entry represented the Federal Republic of Yugoslavia for the first and only time, following the break-up of the Socialist Federal Republic of Yugoslavia in the past year which had been responsible for all previous Yugoslav entries; following the 1992 contest Yugoslavia was excluded from participating and the nation would not return to the contest until 2004, when it competed under its new name Serbia and Montenegro. The 1992 contest was notable in the fact that only two countries which had previously participated in past editions of the event were absent from the contest, namely Monaco and Morocco.

Among the competing entries at this year's contest was the first entry to be performed in a French Creole language, and the first appearance of a song performed in Luxembourgish since 1960.

The 1992 event featured a number of artists who had competed in previous editions for the same country: Sigríður Beinteinsdóttir and Grétar Örvarsson, two members of Heart 2 Heart, had previously represented Iceland in 1990 as Stjórnin; Rom Heck, a member of the group Kontinent, had represented Luxembourg in 1989 as a member of the group Park Café; Linda Martin had represented Ireland in 1984; Mia Martini had represented Italy in 1977; and the group Wind had represented Germany in 1985 and 1987. Additionally, Evridiki participated as lead artist after previously performing backing vocals for Cyprus in 1983, 1986, and 1987.

Eurovision Song Contest 1992 participants
Country	Broadcaster	Artist	Song	Language	Songwriter(s)	Conductor
Austria	ORF	Tony Wegas	"Zusammen geh'n"	German	Dieter Bohlen; Joachim Horn-Bernges	Leon Ives
Belgium	RTBF	Morgane	"Nous on veut des violons"	French	Claude Barzotti; Anne-Marie Gaspard	Frank Fievez
Cyprus	CyBC	Evridiki	"Teriazoume" (Ταιριάζουμε)	Greek	George Theofanous	George Theofanous
Denmark	DR	Lotte Nilsson and Kenny Lübcke	"Alt det som ingen ser"	Danish	Carsten Warming	Henrik Krogsgaard
Finland	YLE	Pave	"Yamma Yamma"	Finnish	Hector; Pave	Olli Ahvenlahti
France	Antenne 2	Kali	"Monté la riviè"	French, Antillean Creole	Rémy Bellenchombre; Kali	Magdi Vasco Noverraz
Germany	MDR (Note: On behalf of the German public broadcasting consortium ARD)	Wind	"Träume sind für alle da"	German	Bernd Meinunger; Ralph Siegel	Norbert Daum
Greece	ERT	Cleopatra	"Olou tou kosmou i elpida" (Όλου του κόσμου η ελπίδα)	Greek	Christos Lagos	Haris Andreadis
Iceland	RÚV	Heart 2 Heart	"Nei eða já"	Icelandic	Friðrik Karlsson; Grétar Örvarsson; Stefán Hilmarsson	Nigel Wright
Ireland	RTÉ	Linda Martin	"Why Me"	English	Johnny Logan	Noel Kelehan
Israel	IBA	Dafna	"Ze Rak Sport" (זה רק ספורט)	Hebrew	Ehud Manor; Kobi Oshrat	Kobi Oshrat
Italy	RAI	Mia Martini	"Rapsodia"	Italian	Giancarlo Bigazzi; Giuseppe Dati	Marco Falagiani
Luxembourg	CLT	Marion Welter and Kontinent	"Sou fräi"	Luxembourgish	Ab van Goor; Jang Linster	Christian Jacob
Malta	PBS	Mary Spiteri	"Little Child"	English	Georgina Abela; Raymond Mahoney	Paul Abela
Netherlands	NOS	Humphrey Campbell	"Wijs me de weg"	Dutch	Edwin Schimscheimer	Harry van Hoof
Norway	NRK	Merethe Trøan	"Visjoner"	Norwegian	Eva Jansen; Robert Morley	Rolf Løvland
Portugal	RTP	Dina	"Amor d'água fresca"	Portuguese	Rosa Lobato de Faria; Ondina Veloso	Carlos Alberto Moniz
Spain	TVE	Serafín	"Todo esto es la música"	Spanish	Luis Miguélez; Alfredo Valbuena	Javier Losada
Sweden	SVT	Christer Björkman	"I morgon är en annan dag"	Swedish	Niklas Strömstedt	Anders Berglund
Switzerland	SRG SSR	Daisy Auvray	"Mister Music Man"	French	Gordon Dent	Roby Seidel
Turkey	TRT	Aylin Vatankoş	"Yaz Bitti"	Turkish	Aldoğan Şimşekyay; Aylin Uçanlar	Aydın Özarı
United Kingdom	BBC	Michael Ball	"One Step Out of Time"	English	Paul Davies; Tony Ryan; Victor Stratton	Ronnie Hazlehurst
Yugoslavia	JRT	Extra Nena	"Ljubim te pesmama" (Љубим те песмама)	Serbian	Gale Janković; Radivoje Radivojević	Anders Berglund

== Production and format ==
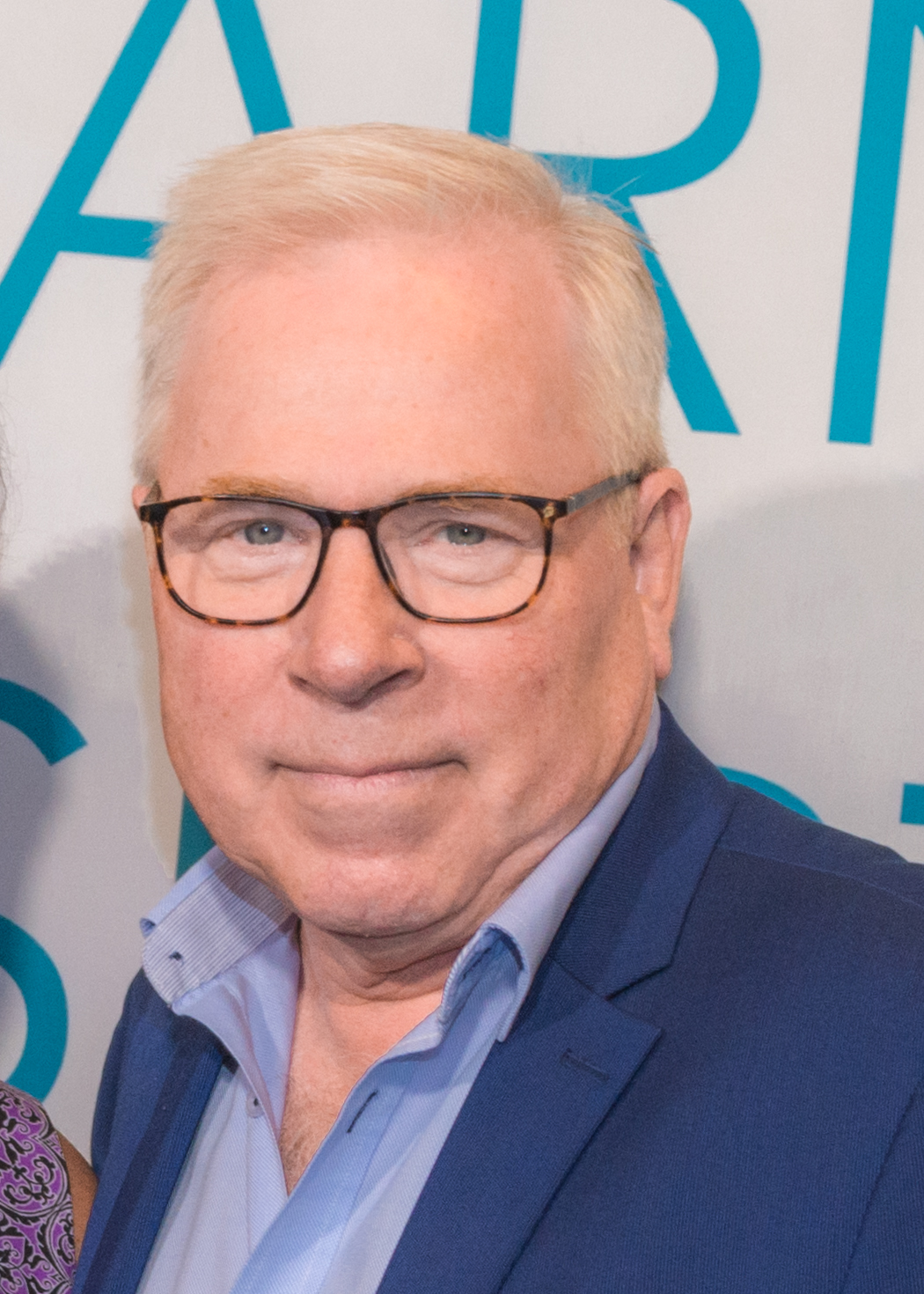
Anders Berglund (pictured in 2019) was the contest's musical director and led the orchestra during the event

The Eurovision Song Contest 1992 was produced by the Swedish public broadcaster Sveriges Television (SVT). Ingvar Ernblad served as executive producer, Kåge Gimtell served as producer and director, Göran Arfs served as designer, and Anders Berglund served as musical director leading an assembled orchestra of around 50 musicians. A separate musical director could be nominated by each participating delegation to lead the orchestra during its country's performance, with the host musical director also available to conduct for those countries which did not nominate their own conductor. On behalf of the European Broadcasting Union (EBU), the event was overseen by Frank Naef as scrutineer.

Each participating broadcaster submitted one song, which was required to be no longer than three minutes in duration and performed in the language, or one of the languages, of the country which it represented. A maximum of six performers were allowed on stage during each country's performance, and all participants were required to have reached the age of 16 in the year of the contest. Each entry could utilise all or part of the live orchestra and could use instrumental-only backing tracks, however any backing tracks used could only include the sound of instruments featured on stage being mimed by the performers.

Following the confirmation of the twenty-three competing countries, the draw to determine the running order was held on 3 December 1991 and was conducted by Carola.

The results of the 1992 contest were determined through the same scoring system as had first been introduced in 1975: each country awarded twelve points to its favourite entry, followed by ten points to its second favourite, and then awarded points in decreasing value from eight to one for the remaining songs which featured in the country's top ten, with countries unable to vote for their own entry. The points awarded by each country were determined by an assembled jury of sixteen individuals, which was required to be split evenly between members of the public and music professionals, between men and women, and by age. Each jury member voted in secret and awarded between one and ten votes to each participating song, excluding that from their own country and with no abstentions permitted. The votes of each member were collected following the country's performance and then tallied by the non-voting jury chairperson to determine the points to be awarded. In any cases where two or more songs in the top ten received the same number of votes, a show of hands by all jury members was used to determine the final placing.

The stage design for the Malmö contest centred around a large representation of the bow of a Viking ship, flanked on either side by sets of stairs, while a hexagonal design was used for the floor area in front which was painted to resemble the Eurovision network logo. To the left of the stage as seen by the audience sat the orchestra, while to the right stood a large video wall and a smaller stage for use by the presenters to introduce each act and during the voting sequence. Behind the Viking ship the backdrop featured a representation using neon lighting of the span of the Öresund Bridge, the construction of which had yet to begin but which would connect Sweden and Denmark, and thus connecting Sweden with the bulk of the European mainland from 1999.

Rehearsals in the contest venue began on 3 May 1992, focussing on the opening performances and interval act. The participating artists began their rehearsals on 4 May, and each participating delegation was afforded two technical rehearsals in the week of the contest, with countries rehearsing in the order in which they would perform. The first rehearsals, held on 4 and 5 May, saw each country given a 40-minute slot on stage, followed by a press conference. Each delegation was then given a second slot to rehearse on stage, this time for 30 minutes, on 6 and 7 May. Three dress rehearsals were held with all artists, two held in the afternoon and evening of 8 May and one final rehearsal in the afternoon of 9 May. Audiences were present for the latter two dress rehearsals, and the final afternoon dress rehearsal was also recorded for use as a production stand-by. During the contest week the participating delegations were also invited to a welcome reception, which was held in Malmö rådhus. The Yugoslav representative had been given additional security in the form of bodyguards and a doctor due to the breakout of the Yugoslav Wars.

This year's contest featured a mascot: the "Eurobird", an anthropomorphic bird, featured as a computer animated character during the transition between the competing songs.

== Contest overview ==
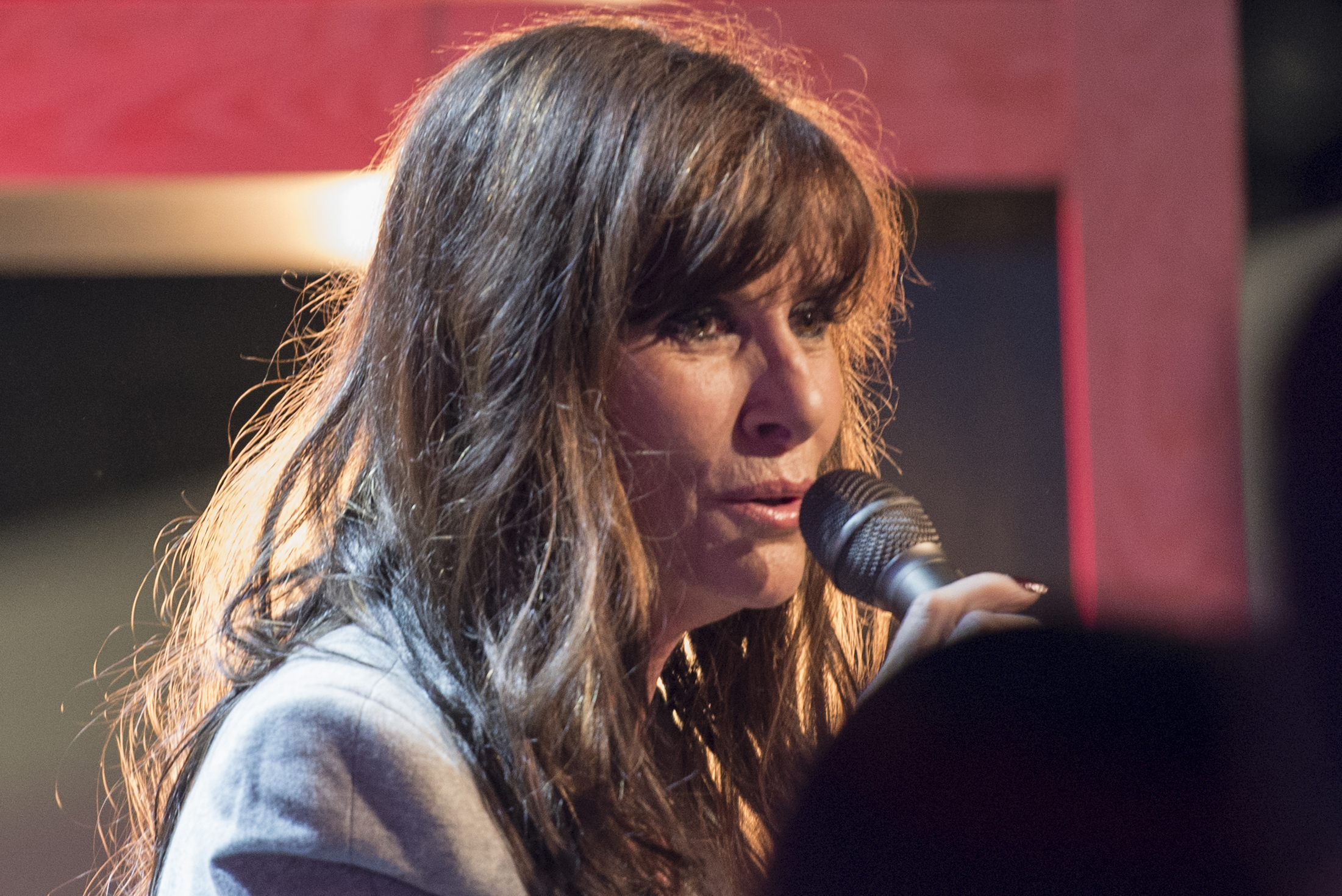
Having previously come second at the 1984 contest, Ireland's Linda Martin (pictured in 2013) returned and won the event with the song "Why Me?".

The contest took place on 9 May 1992 at 21:00 (CEST) with a duration of 3 hours. The show was presented by the Swedish journalists and television presenters Lydia Capolicchio and Harald Treutiger.

The opening sequence featured a computer-generated animation showing the journey from the previous year's host city Rome to Malmö, including oversized models placed on the European continent representing the Colosseum, the Leaning Tower of Pisa, the Alps, the Eiffel Tower, and structures in Malmö including Malmö Castle, Kronprinsen and the Hyllie Water Tower. This was followed by performances within the venue by the Malmöflickorna rhythmic gymnastics troupe, involving ribbon choreography to an instrumental version of "Fångad av en stormvind", and the previous year's winning artist Carola who sang the song "All the Reasons to Live". The interval act, entitled "A Century of Dance", featured David Johnson, Teresa Ibrahim, the Crazy Feat dance troupe and dancers from the Nöjesteatern, in a performance that showed the evolution of dance in Sweden and worldwide over the previous century; among the music pieces featured during the performance was "It Must Have Been Love" originally recorded by the Swedish duo Roxette. The trophy awarded to the winners was presented at the end of the broadcast by Carola.

The winner was Ireland represented by the song "Why Me?", written by Johnny Logan and performed by Linda Martin. This was the fourth time that Ireland had won the contest, following victories in 1970, 1980, and 1987. Having come second in 1984, Martin became the third artist to have placed both first and second in the contest, alongside Lys Assia and Gigliola Cinquetti, and songwriter Logan, who had already won the contest twice as a performer in 1980 and 1987 – the latter win additionally as the songwriter – became the third individual to record two songwriting wins, alongside Willy van Hemert and Yves Dessca, and became the first, and as of 2023 only, individual to record three wins as either singer or songwriter. The United Kingdom finished in second place for a record-extending thirteenth time, while Malta and Greece recorded their best ever results to date with third- and fifth-place finishes respectively. Conversely host country Sweden recorded one of its worst ever results, finishing 22nd and second-to-last, and Finland picked up its seventh last-place finish. With Ireland, the United Kingdom and Malta taking the top three places, all entries which were performed in English reached the top positions.

Results of the Eurovision Song Contest 1992
R/O	Country	Artist	Song	Points	Place
1	Spain	Serafín	"Todo esto es la música"	37	14
2	Belgium	Morgane	"Nous on veut des violons"	11	20
3	Israel	Dafna	"Ze Rak Sport"	85	6
4	Turkey	Aylin Vatankoş	"Yaz Bitti"	17	19
5	Greece	Cleopatra	"Olou tou kosmou i elpida"	94	5
6	France	Kali	"Monté la riviè"	73	8
7	Sweden	Christer Björkman	"I morgon är en annan dag"	9	22
8	Portugal	Dina	"Amor d'água fresca"	26	17
9	Cyprus	Evridiki	"Teriazoume"	57	11
10	Malta	Mary Spiteri	"Little Child"	123	3
11	Iceland	Heart 2 Heart	"Nei eða já"	80	7
12	Finland	Pave	"Yamma Yamma"	4	23
13	Switzerland	Daisy Auvray	"Mister Music Man"	32	15
14	Luxembourg	Marion Welter and Kontinent	"Sou fräi"	10	21
15	Austria	Tony Wegas	"Zusammen geh'n"	63	10
16	United Kingdom	Michael Ball	"One Step Out of Time"	139	2
17	Ireland	Linda Martin	"Why Me"	155	1
18	Denmark	Lotte Nilsson and Kenny Lübcke	"Alt det som ingen ser"	47	12
19	Italy	Mia Martini	"Rapsodia"	111	4
20	Yugoslavia	Extra Nena	"Ljubim te pesmama"	44	13
21	Norway	Merethe Trøan	"Visjoner"	23	18
22	Germany	Wind	"Träume sind für alle da"	27	16
23	Netherlands	Humphrey Campbell	"Wijs me de weg"	67	9

=== Spokespersons ===
Each participating broadcaster appointed a spokesperson, connected to the contest venue via telephone lines and responsible for announcing, in English or French, the votes for its respective country. Known spokespersons at the 1992 contest are listed below.

- Finland – Solveig Herlin
- France – Olivier Minne
- Ireland – Eileen Dunne
- Luxembourg – Maurice Molitor
- Malta – Joanna Drake
- Sweden – Jan Jingryd
- United Kingdom – Colin Berry

== Detailed voting results ==
Jury voting was used to determine the points awarded by all countries. The announcement of the results from each country was conducted in the order in which they performed, with the spokespersons announcing their country's points in English or French in ascending order. The detailed breakdown of the points awarded by each country is listed in the tables below.

Detailed voting results of the Eurovision Song Contest 1992
		Total score	Spain	Belgium	Israel	Turkey	Greece	France	Sweden	Portugal	Cyprus	Malta	Iceland	Finland	Switzerland	Luxembourg	Austria	United Kingdom	Ireland	Denmark	Italy	Yugoslavia	Norway	Germany	Netherlands
Contestants	Spain	37		1		1	4	6				2		3		3	2	1		1	7		5		1
Contestants	Belgium	11	3			4		3								1									
Contestants	Israel	85	10			2		8	4	7	4	7			4	8	1	7		2		**12**	2	4	3
Contestants	Turkey	17										8							3			6			
Contestants	Greece	94			7	8		7	3	5	**12**		2	5	10		4				**12**	7	8		4
Contestants	France	73	6		**12**	3					3			7	**12**				5		6		10	3	6
Contestants	Sweden	9						1												4		4			
Contestants	Portugal	26			8		2							2							1	5		8	
Contestants	Cyprus	57			3		10	2		2		1		8	2				6		4	8	3		8
Contestants	Malta	123	**12**	10			7		**12**	**12**	1		8		5	**12**	8		10	8	3	10			5
Contestants	Iceland	80	8	4	4		6		6	6					3	5	7	**12**		5	5		1	6	2
Contestants	Finland	4			1																	3			
Contestants	Switzerland	32		5									**12**					4	1		10				
Contestants	Luxembourg	10										10													
Contestants	Austria	63	2	8			8		1	3	8	4						10	**12**	7					
Contestants	United Kingdom	139	5	**12**	2	10		10	5		6	6	4	6	8	7	**12**		7	**12**	8			**12**	7
Contestants	Ireland	**155**	1	7		**12**	**12**		10	4	5	**12**	7	10	6	10	10	8		10	2	2	7	10	10
Contestants	Denmark	47	4		6				7	1			6			6	3	3					6	5	
Contestants	Italy	111				5	3	**12**	8	8	10	5	10	**12**	7		6						**12**	1	**12**
Contestants	Yugoslavia	44			10	6	1	5			2	3	5	4		2			4					2	
Contestants	Norway	23		3					2				1	1		4		5		6		1			
Contestants	Germany	27		6						10								6	2	3					
Contestants	Netherlands	67	7	2	5	7	5	4			7		3		1		5	2	8				4	7	

=== 12 points ===
The below table summarises how the maximum 12 points were awarded from one country to another. The winning country is shown in bold. Italy, Malta and the United Kingdom each received the maximum score of 12 points from four of the voting countries, with Ireland receiving three sets of 12 points, France and Greece receiving two sets of maximum scores each, and Austria, Iceland, Israel and Switzerland each receiving one maximum score.

Distribution of 12 points awarded at the Eurovision Song Contest 1992
N.	Contestant	Nation(s) giving 12 points
4	Italy	Finland, France, Netherlands, Norway
4	Malta	Luxembourg, Portugal, Spain, Sweden
4	United Kingdom	Austria, Belgium, Denmark, Germany
3	**Ireland**	Greece, Malta, Turkey
2	France	Israel, Switzerland
2	Greece	Cyprus, Italy
1	Austria	Ireland
1	Iceland	United Kingdom
1	Israel	Yugoslavia
1	Switzerland	Iceland

== Broadcasts ==
Each participating broadcaster was required to relay the contest via its networks. Non-participating broadcasters were also able to relay the contest as "passive participants". Broadcasters were able to send commentators to provide coverage of the contest in their own native language and to relay information about the artists and songs to their television viewers. These commentators were typically sent to the venue to report on the event, and were able to provide commentary from small booths constructed at the back of the venue.

The contest was broadcast in 44 countries, including Australia and South Korea, with an estimated global audience of 150 to 250 million viewers. Known details on the broadcasts in each country, including the specific broadcasting stations and commentators are shown in the tables below.

Broadcasters and commentators in participating countries
Country	Broadcaster	Channel(s)	Commentator(s)	Ref.
Austria	ORF	FS1	Ernst Grissemann	
Belgium	RTBF	RTBF1	Claude Delacroix	
Belgium	BRTN	TV1, TV2	André Vermeulen	
Belgium	BRTN	Radio 2	Marc Brillouet and Julien Put	
Cyprus	CyBC	RIK 1	Evi Papamichail	
Cyprus	CyBC	A Programma		
Cyprus	Various radio stations (Note: Simultaneous broadcast on Radio Castro, Radio Larnaca, Radio FM, Channel 9.86, Radio Capital, Radio Fredrik, Radio Epistrofi, Radio TOR FM, Radio ONE, Radio Paphos, Radio Kinyras, and Radio MAGIC)			
Denmark	DR	DR TV	Jørgen de Mylius	
Denmark	DR	DR P3	Jesper Bæhrenz and Andrew Jensen	
Finland	YLE	TV1	Erkki Pohjanheimo and Kati Bergman	
Finland	YLE	Radiomafia	Pekka and Pätkä	
Finland	YLE	Riksradion	Johan Finne, Paul Olin and Wille Wilenius	
France	Antenne 2		Thierry Beccaro	
Germany	ARD	Erstes Deutsches Fernsehen	Jan Hofer	
Germany	SSVC	SSVC Television		
Greece	ERT	ET1		
Iceland	RÚV	Sjónvarpið, Rás 2	Árni Snævarr	
Ireland	RTÉ	RTÉ 1	Pat Kenny	
Ireland	RTÉ	2FM	Larry Gogan	
Israel	IBA	Israeli Television		
Italy	RAI	Rai Due (Note: Deferred broadcast at 23:50 (CEST))	Peppi Franzelin	
Luxembourg	CLT	RTL Hei Elei	Romain Goerend	
Malta	PBS	TVM, Radio Malta 2	Anna Bonanno	
Netherlands	NOS	Nederland 3	Willem van Beusekom	
Norway	NRK	NRK Fjernsynet	John Andreassen	
Norway	NRK	NRK P2	Leif Erik Forberg and Vidar Lønn-Arnesen	
Portugal	RTP	RTP Canal 1	Eládio Clímaco	
Spain	TVE	La 2	José Luis Uribarri	
Sweden	SVT	TV2	Jesper Aspegren	
Sweden	RR	SR P3	Lotta Engberg and Kalle Oldby	
Switzerland	SRG SSR	TV DRS	Mariano Tschuor	
Switzerland	SRG SSR	TSR Chaîne nationale (Note: Broadcast through a second audio programme on TV DRS)	Ivan Frésard	
Switzerland	SRG SSR	TSI Canale nazionale		
Turkey	TRT	TV1		
United Kingdom	BBC	BBC1 (Note: Additional live broadcast on BBC World Service Television)	Terry Wogan	
United Kingdom	BBC	BBC Radio 2	Ken Bruce	
Yugoslavia	JRT	TV Beograd 1, TV Novi Sad 1	Mladen Popović	
Yugoslavia	JRT	Radio Beograd 202		

Broadcasters and commentators in non-participating countries
Country	Broadcaster	Channel(s)	Commentator(s)	Ref.
Australia	SBS	SBS TV (Note: Deferred broadcast the following day at 20:30 (AEST))		
Czechoslovakia	ČST	F1 (Note: Delayed broadcast on 15 May 1992 at 21:35 (CEST))		
Estonia	ETV		Ivo Linna and Olavi Pihlamägi	
Faroe Islands	SvF			
Greenland	KNR	KNR (Note: Delayed broadcast on 16 May 1992 at 21:05 (WGST))		
Hungary	MTV	MTV1 (Note: Deferred broadcast at 22:20 (CEST))	István Vágó	
Macedonia	MRT	MTV 1		
Poland	TVP	TVP1	Artur Orzech and Maria Szabłowska	
Romania	TVR	TVR 1 (Note: Deferred broadcast at 23:30 (CEST))		
Russia	RTR	RTR (Note: Also broadcast deferred via the Orbita satellite broadcasting system in the Russian Far East)		
Slovenia	RTVSLO	SLO 1	Miša Molk	
South Korea	KBS	KBS1 (Note: Delayed broadcast on 7 June 1992 at 14:50 (KST))	Kang In-gu and Kim Ja-young	

== Notes and references ==
=== Bibliography ===
- Murtomäki, Asko (2007). Finland 12 points! Suomen Euroviisut (in Finnish). Helsinki, Finland: Teos. ISBN 951-851-106-3.
- O'Connor, John Kennedy (2010). The Eurovision Song Contest: The Official History (2nd ed.). London, United Kingdom: Carlton Books. ISBN 978-1-84732-521-1.
- Roxburgh, Gordon (2020). Songs for Europe: The United Kingdom at the Eurovision Song Contest. Vol. Four: The 1990s. Prestatyn, United Kingdom: Telos Publishing. ISBN 978-1-84583-163-9.
- Thorsson, Leif; Verhage, Martin (2006). Melodifestivalen genom tiderna : de svenska uttagningarna och internationella finalerna [Melodifestivalen through the ages: the Swedish selections and international finals] (in Swedish). Stockholm, Sweden: Premium Publishing. ISBN 91-89136-29-2.
