= Capolicchio =

Capolicchio is a surname. Notable people with the surname include:

- Lino Capolicchio (1943–2022), Italian actor, screenwriter, and film director
- Lydia Capolicchio (born 1964), Swedish journalist and hostess
