= Yugoslavia in the Eurovision Song Contest 1992 =

FR Yugoslavia in the Eurovision Song Contest 1992
- Eurovision Song Contest 1992
- Participating broadcaster: Jugoslavenska radiotelevizija (JRT)
- Country: Yugoslavia
- Selection process: National final
- Selection date: 28 March 1992

Competing entry
- Song: "Ljubim te pesmama"
- Artist: Extra Nena
- Songwriters: Radivoje Radivojević; Gale Janković

Placement
- Final result: 13th, 44 points

Participation chronology

Yugoslavia was represented at the Eurovision Song Contest 1992 with the song "Ljubim te pesmama", composed by Radivoje Radivojević, with lyrics by Gale Janković, and performed by Extra Nena. The Yugoslav participating broadcaster, Jugoslavenska radiotelevizija (JRT), selected its entry through a national final. This was the last entry from Yugoslavia in the Eurovision Song Contest.

== Before Eurovision ==
=== National final ===
Jugoslavenska ratiotelevizija (JRT) held a national final to select its entry for the Eurovision Song Contest 1992. Following a meeting between all eight JRT subnational broadcasters on 17 October 1991, JRT confirmed its participation in the 1992 contest and that Makedonska Radio-Televizija (MRT) was to organise and host a national final which was going to be a cooperation and competition between eight of the subnational broadcasters that made up JRT at the time: HRT (Croatia), RTCG (Montenegro), RTV Beograd (Serbia), RTV Novi Sad (Autonomous Province of Vojvodina), RTV Priština (Autonomous Province of Kosovo and Metohija), RTV Sarajevo (SR Bosnia and Herzegovina), MRT (Macedonia), and RTV Slovenija (Slovenia). However, by 1 February 1992, RTV Slovenija and HRT had withdrawn from the contest and RTV Beograd had taken over hosting and organising duties from MRT.

The national final had several names in TV-guides from the time, such as: "Izbor JRT predstavnika za "Pesmu Evrovizije"" in Serbo-Croatian. The national final was referred to in the broadcast as "Jugoslovenski izbor za pesmu Evrovizije '92". However, the national final along with every other Yugoslav national final has been referred to post hoc as Jugovizija by several sources.

==== Competing entries ====
By 25 February 1992, each of the six participating broadcasters submitted one entry to JRT for the final, and several additional entries to a JRT jury, consisting of one member from each of the six broadcasters, who were tasked with selecting at least six additional songs to add to the competition. A total of twenty songs took part in the competition after MRT and RTV Priština withdrew their participants from the competition. Around 100 songs were submitted to the national final.

Competing entries
Artist	Song	Songwriter(s)		Conductor	Broadcaster
Artist	Song	Composer(s)	Lyricist(s)	Conductor	Broadcaster
Alma Čardžić	"Ljubav će pobijediti" (Љубав ће побједити)	Faruk Hasambegović	Željko Pržulj	Milivoje Marković	(Socialist Republic of Bosnia and Herzegovina) RTV Sarajevo
Arnela Konaković	"Prva noć" (Прва ноћ)	Slobodan Vujović		Zvonimir Skerl	(Socialist Republic of Bosnia and Herzegovina) RTV Sarajevo
Bajone	"Molitva" (Молитва)	Bajone		Milivoje Marković	(Socialist Republic of Serbia) RTV Beograd
Bojan	"Dajana" (Дајана)	Slobodan Bućevac	Zdravko Đuranović	Radovan Papović	(Socialist Republic of Montenegro) RTCG
Dejan Božović	"Dan samo zna, Tamara" (Дан само зна, Тамара)	Dejan Božović	Dragi Bujačić		(Socialist Republic of Montenegro) RTCG
Extra Nena	"Ljubim te pesmama" (Љубим те песмама)	Radivoje Radivojević	Gale Janković	Zvonimir Skerl	(Socialist Republic of Serbia) RTV Beograd
Filip and Nada	"Zemlja anđela" (Земља анђела)	Aleksandar Filipović	Leontina Vukomanović	Zvonimir Skerl	(Socialist Republic of Serbia) RTV Beograd
Ledeni Princ	"Pokloni mi poljupce" (Поклони ми пољупце)	Predrag Radivojević		Jovan Adamov	(Socialist Autonomous Province of Vojvodina) RTV Novi Sad
Mag	"Nikome te dao ne bih" (Никоме те дао не бих)	Aleksandar Đekić		Zvonimir Skerl	(Socialist Autonomous Province of Vojvodina) RTV Novi Sad
Makadam	"Sanjam ljeto" (Сањам љето)	Mirsad Serhatlić	Dragan Radulović	Aleksandar Tamindžić	(Socialist Republic of Montenegro) RTCG
Perper	"S druge strane" (С друге стране)	Perper	Momčilo Zeković	Radovan Papović	(Socialist Republic of Montenegro) RTCG
Renata	"Ti si vetar" (Ти си ветар)	Jovan Adamov	Miroslav Nastasijević	Jovan Adamov	(Socialist Autonomous Province of Vojvodina) RTV Novi Sad
Sestre Barudžije	"Hej, hej, vrati se" (Хеј, хеј, врати се)	Leontina Vukomanović		Milivoje Marković	(Socialist Republic of Serbia) RTV Beograd
Sonja Mitrović	"Nebo je plakalo za nama" (Небо је плакало за нама)	Bata Pavlović	Miki Kosanović	Milivoje Marković	(Socialist Autonomous Province of Vojvodina) RTV Novi Sad
Sunčeve pege	"Viva rock 'n' roll"	Branko Pražić		Jovan Adamov	(Socialist Autonomous Province of Vojvodina) RTV Novi Sad
Vampiri	"Ding ding dong" (Динг динг донг)	Aleksandar Eraković; Dejan Pejović		Dragan Ilić	(Socialist Republic of Serbia) RTV Beograd
Violeta and Triler	"Bio si sve" (Био си све)	Srđan Ćuković, Dragomir Stanojević	Srđan Ćuković	Zvonimir Skerl	(Socialist Autonomous Province of Vojvodina) RTV Novi Sad
Viva Romana	"Na tvoj mig" (На твој миг)	Željko Hubač			(Socialist Autonomous Province of Vojvodina) RTV Novi Sad
Vlada and Music Box	"Hiljadu snova" (Хиљаду снова)	Dobrivoj Kanurski	Vlado Janevski, Dobrivoj Kanurski	Jovan Adamov	(Socialist Autonomous Province of Vojvodina) RTV Novi Sad
Zerina Cokoja	"Neka te pjesmom probude" (Нека те пјесмом пробуде)	Brano Likić	Dragan Maksimović	Milivoje Marković	(Socialist Republic of Bosnia and Herzegovina) RTV Sarajevo

==== Final ====
The show was held in RTV Beograd studio 8 in Košutnjak, Belgrade, on 28 March 1992 at 21:00 CET, and was organised by RTV Beograd. The show was hosted by Dragana Katić, Maja Milatović, Milica Gacin, and Radoš Bajić. The results were decided by a fifteen-member professional jury handing out points in a 7-5-3-2-1 fashion, with 7 points going to their favourite song.

The contest was broadcast on several channels of JRT. It is known to have been broadcast on television on Televizija Beograd 1, Televizija Sarajevo 1, and Televizija Novi Sad.

Final - 28 March 1992
R/O	Artist	Song	Points	Place
1	Alma Čardžić	"Ljubav će pobijediti"	6	10
2	Vlada and Music Box	"Hiljadu snova"	5	11
3	Sunčeve pege	"Viva rock 'n' roll"	0	16
4	Viva Romana	"Na tvoj mig"	3	13
5	Makadam	"Sanjam ljeto"	22	6
6	Mag	"Nikome te dao ne bih"	10	9
7	Dejan Božović	"Dan samo zna, Tamara"	0	16
8	Sonja Mitrović	"Nebo je plakalo za nama"	34	4
9	Violeta and Triler	"Bio si sve"	0	16
10	Filip and Nada	"Zemlja anđela"	12	8
11	Perper	"S druge strane"	0	16
12	Sestre Barudžije	"Hej, hej, vrati se"	5	11
13	Renata	"Ti si vetar"	18	7
14	Zerina Cokoja	"Neka te pjesmom probude"	2	14
15	Bojan	"Dajana"	31	5
16	Bajone	"Molitva"	2	14
17	Extra Nena	"Ljubim te pesmama"	44	1
18	Vampiri	"Ding ding dong"	41	2
19	Ledeni Princ	"Pokloni mi poljupce"	0	16
20	Arnela Konaković	"Prva noć"	35	3

Detailed jury votes
R/O	Song	Enes Bajramović	Vojkan Borisavljević	Ivan Vitalić	Zoran Danilović	Feti Dautović	Dušan Živić	Stevan Zarić	Ivana Jeftić	Andjelko Maletić	Brano Mališić	Miroslav Maraus	Vesna Mulić	Lola Novaković	Dejan Perišić	Sonja Spasić	Total
1	"Ljubav će pobijediti"					3						3					6
2	"Hiljadu snova"		1			2								2			5
3	"Viva rock 'n' roll"																0
4	"Na mig tvoj"											2	1				3
5	"Sanjam ljeto"	2			7						5		3		5		22
6	"Nikome te dao ne bih"			2									5		2	1	10
7	"Dan samo zna, Tamara"																0
8	"Nebo je plakalo za nama"			7	5		5	7			3					7	34
9	"Bio si sve"																0
10	"Zemlja anđela"	5					1	1				5					12
11	"S druge strane"																0
12	"Hej, hej, vrati se"			3					2								5
13	"Ti si vetar"						3	5	5	5							18
14	"Neka te pjesmom probude"					1								1			2
15	"Dajana"		3	5	3						7			3	7	3	31
16	"Molitva"									2							2
17	"Ljubim te pesmama"	1	7		1	5	7	3	1	7	2			7	3		44
18	"Ding ding dong"	3	5			7	2	2	3	1		1	7	5		5	41
19	"Pokloni mi poljupce"																0
20	"Prva noć"	7	2	1	2				7	3	1	7	2		1	2	35

== At Eurovision ==
Extra Nena performed 20th on the night of the contest, following Italy and preceding Norway. At the close of voting, it had received a total of 44 points, placing 13th in a field of 23 competing countries. The Yugoslav jury awarded its 12 points to Israel.

The contest is known to have been broadcast on television on TV Beograd 1 and TV Novi Sad 1, both with commentary by Mladen Popović.

=== Voting ===
Points awarded to Yugoslavia
Score	Country
12 points	
10 points	Israel
8 points	
7 points	
6 points	Turkey
5 points	France; Iceland
4 points	Finland; Ireland
3 points	Malta
2 points	Cyprus; Germany; Luxembourg
1 point	Greece

Points awarded by Yugoslavia
Score	Country
12 points	Israel
10 points	Malta
8 points	Cyprus
7 points	Greece
6 points	Turkey
5 points	Portugal
4 points	Sweden
3 points	Finland
2 points	Ireland
1 point	Norway

== After Eurovision ==
This was the final participation of Yugoslavia at Eurovision Song Contest. Following the 1992 contest, the Yugoslav EBU member broadcaster, Jugoslovenska radiotelevizija (JRT), was disbanded that same year and its successor organisations in the FR Yugoslavia, Radio-televizija Srbije (RTS) in Serbia and Radio-televizija Crne Gore (RTCG) in Montenegro, were barred from joining the union due to sanctions placed by United Nations Security Council Resolution 757 against the country. The union between RTS and RTCG, Udruženje javnih radija i televizija (UJRT), was finally readmitted to the EBU on 1 July 2001 after the State Union of Serbia and Montenegro gained recognition from the United Nations and the International Telecommunication Union.

The broadcasters from the newly-formed republics, Bosnia and Herzegovina, Croatia, and Slovenia then appeared independently at Eurovision beginning with the 1993 contest, MRT from North Macedonia joined the contest in 1998, and finally UJRT from Serbia and Montenegro joined the contest in 2004.
