= Luxembourg in the Eurovision Song Contest 1992 =

- Eurovision Song Contest 1992
- Participating broadcaster: Compagnie Luxembourgeoise de Télédiffusion (CLT)
- Country: Luxembourg
- Selection process: Artist: Internal selection Song: National final
- Selection date: Artist: 11 March 1992; Song: 22 March 1992

Competing entry
- Song: "Sou fräi"
- Artist: Marion Welter and Kontinent
- Songwriters: Jang Linster; Ab van Goor

Placement
- Final result: 21st, 10 points

Participation chronology

Luxembourg was represented at the Eurovision Song Contest 1992 with the song "Sou fräi" (Luxembourgish pronunciation: [zəʊ̯ ˈfʀæːɪ̯]; transl. "So free"), written by Jang Linster and Ab van Goor, and performed by Marion Welter and the band Kontinent. The Luxembourgish participating broadcaster, the Compagnie Luxembourgeoise de Télédiffusion (CLT), selected its entry through a national final, after having previously selected the performer internally.

CLT organised a national final in order to select Marion Welter and Kontinent's song and "Sou fräi" emerged as the winning song on 22 March 1992 following a public postcard vote.

Luxembourg competed in the Eurovision Song Contest which took place on 9 May 1992. Performing during the show in position 14, Luxembourg placed twenty-first out of the 23 participating countries, scoring 10 points.

== Background ==
Prior to the 1992 contest, the Compagnie Luxembourgeoise de Télédiffusion (CLT) had participated in the Eurovision Song Contest representing Luxembourg thirty-six times since debuting in its first edition in 1956. It had won the contest on five occasions: in 1961 with "Nous les amoureux" performed by Jean-Claude Pascal, in 1965 with "Poupée de cire, poupée de son" performed by France Gall, in 1972 with "Après toi" performed by Vicky Leandros, in 1973 with "Tu te reconnaîtras" performed by Anne-Marie David, and finally in 1983 with "Si la vie est cadeau" performed by Corinne Hermès.

As part of its duties as participating broadcaster, CLT organises the selection of its entry in the Eurovision Song Contest and broadcasts the event in the country. In the past, CLT has selected its entries by using both national finals and internal selections. For the 1992 contest, the broadcaster opted to internally select the artist and organise a national final to select the song.

== Before Eurovision ==
=== Artist selection ===
On 11 March 1992, CLT announced that Marion Welter had been internally selected to represent Luxembourg in Malmö. It was also announced that a national final would be held to select the song Welter would perform.

=== National final ===
Two songs, written in Luxembourgish by Jang Linster and Ab van Goor, were selected for the national final and announced on 11 March 1992. Video recordings of Marion Welter performing the two competing songs at Villa Louvigny in Luxembourg City were presented during the 15 March 1992 broadcast of the television programme RTL-Hei elei and the public was able to vote for their favourite song through postcard voting until 19 March 1992. The winning song, "Sou fräi", was announced in the subsequent episode of RTL-Hei elei on 22 March 1992.

Final – 22 March 1992
R/O	Song	Percentage	Place
1	"Sou fräi"	51%	1
2	"Iwerall doheem"	49%	2

== At Eurovision ==
The Eurovision Song Contest 1992 took place on 9 May 1992 at the Malmö Isstadion in Malmö, Sweden. On 3 December 1991, an allocation draw was held which determined the running order and Luxembourg was set to perform in position 14, following the entry from Switzerland and before the entry from Austria. Marion Welter was joined on stage by Kontinent, a five-member band consisting of Änder Hirtt (vocals), Patrick Hartert (keyboards), the co-composer of "Sou fräi" Ab van Goor (drums and vocals), Romm Heck (bass and vocals) and Gordon Smith (guitar and vocals). The conductor for the Luxembourgish entry at the contest was Christian Jacob and Luxembourg finished in twenty-first place with 10 points. The Luxembourgish jury awarded its 12 points to Malta in the contest.

In Luxembourg, the contest was broadcast on RTL Hei Elei (with commentary by Romain Goerend).

=== Voting ===
Points awarded to Luxembourg
Score	Country
12 points	
10 points	Malta
8 points	
7 points	
6 points	
5 points	
4 points	
3 points	
2 points	
1 point	

Points awarded by Luxembourg
Score	Country
12 points	Malta
10 points	Ireland
8 points	Israel
7 points	United Kingdom
6 points	Denmark
5 points	Iceland
4 points	Norway
3 points	Spain
2 points	Yugoslavia
1 point	Belgium
