= Spain in the Eurovision Song Contest 1992 =

- Eurovision Song Contest 1992
- Participating broadcaster: Televisión Española (TVE)
- Country: Spain
- Selection process: Internal selection
- Announcement date: Artist: 10 March 1992; Song: 3 April 1992

Competing entry
- Song: "Todo esto es la música"
- Artist: Serafín
- Songwriters: Luis Miguélez; Alfredo Valbuena

Placement
- Final result: 14th, 37 points

Participation chronology

Spain was represented at the Eurovision Song Contest 1992 with the song "Todo esto es la música", written by Luis Miguélez and Alfredo Valbuena, and performed by Serafín Zubiri credited simply as Serafín. The Spanish participating broadcaster, Televisión Española (TVE), internally selected its entry for the contest. The song, performed in position 1, placed fourteenth out of twenty-three competing entries with 37 points.

== Before Eurovision ==
Televisión Española (TVE) internally selected "Todo esto es la música" performed by Serafín Zubiri as its entry for the Eurovision Song Contest 1992. The song was written by Luis Miguélez and Alfredo Valbuena. The title of the song, the songwriter, and the performer were announced on 10 March 1992. The song was presented on 3 April.

== At Eurovision ==
On 9 May 1992, the Eurovision Song Contest was held at the Malmö Isstadion in Malmö hosted by Sveriges Television (SVT), and broadcast live throughout the continent. Zubiri performed "Todo esto es la música" first on the evening, preceding Belgium. He was accompanied on stage by Mabi Vidal, María Lar, Adolfo Rodríguez, Manuel Rodríguez as backing singers, and by Ernesto Baquero as backing guitarist. Javier Losada conducted the event's live orchestra in the performance of the Spanish entry. At the close of the voting "Todo esto es la música" had received 37 points, placing 14th in a field of 23.

TVE broadcast the contest in Spain on La 2 with commentary by José Luis Uribarri. Before the event, TVE aired a talk show hosted by Isabel Gemio introducing the Spanish jury, which continued after the contest commenting on the results.

=== Voting ===
TVE assembled a jury panel with sixteen members. The following members comprised the Spanish jury:

- Karina – singer, represented Spain in 1971
- José Manuel Parada – journalist
- Bárbara Rey – actress
- Pablo Carbonell – singer and comedian
- Roberto Gil – singer, member of Tennessee
- Fernando Reinlein – journalist
- Marisa Collado – psychic and parapsychologist
- Miguel Ángel Barneto - economist
- Willy Rubio – screenwriter and musician
- Santiago Palacios – gynecologist
- Teresa Rioné – runner
- Angustias Gallardo – lawyer
- Iván Rodríguez – student
- Bárbara Martín – student
- Pilar Sánchez – businesswoman
- Esther del Prado – actress

The jury was chaired by José Luis Gracia. The jury awarded its maximum of 12 points to Malta.

Points awarded to Spain
Score	Country
12 points	
10 points	
8 points	
7 points	Italy
6 points	France
5 points	Norway
4 points	Greece
3 points	Finland; Luxembourg
2 points	Austria; Malta
1 point	Belgium; Denmark; Netherlands; Turkey; United Kingdom

Points awarded by Spain
Score	Country
12 points	Malta
10 points	Israel
8 points	Iceland
7 points	Netherlands
6 points	France
5 points	United Kingdom
4 points	Denmark
3 points	Belgium
2 points	Austria
1 point	Ireland
