= Serafín Zubiri =

Spanish musician (born 1964)

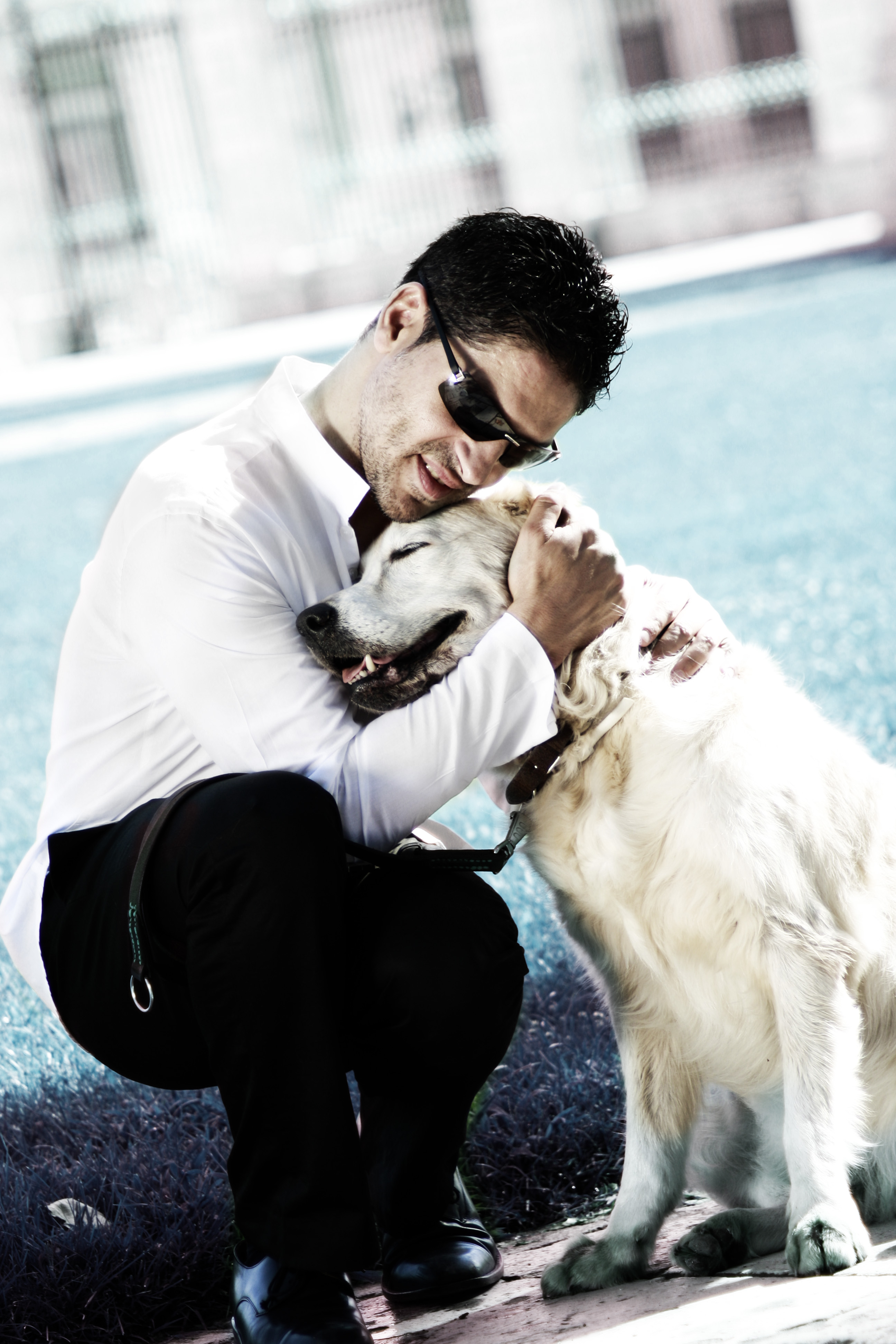
- Serafín Zubiri with his guide dog, Xifo in 2010

Background information
- Born: Serafín Lizoain Vidondo; 20 April 1964 (age 62); Pamplona (Navarre), Spain
- Occupation: Singer

Serafín Lizoain Vidondo (born 20 April 1964 in Pamplona, Spain) better known as Serafín Zubiri is a singer, composer and piano player.

== Biography ==
Zubiri is a blind singer and pianist who has represented Spain twice in the Eurovision Song Contest. He was the vocalist for the group Equus until 1987. In 1992, he recorded the Spanish soundtrack for the Disney film Beauty and the Beast. That same year, he went to the Swedish city of Malmö to represent Spain at the Eurovision Song Contest 1992 with the ballad "Todo esto es la música". In 2000, he won Eurocanción 2000, a contest organized by TVE, and thus again represented Spain at the Eurovision Song Contest 2000 in Stockholm, with the song "Colgado de un sueño" by Chema Purón.

He has also worked in radio and hosted the program for Disabled Unlimited (local TV in Pamplona). He starred alongside Marta Sánchez in the musical play called La magia de Broadway, which premiered at the Teatro Lara in Madrid in October 2000. In 2005, he was appointed vice president of the International Blind Sports Federation (IBSA). In 2007, he competed in the TVE show Mira quién baila, the Spanish version of Dancing With the Stars (where he was runner up). On 14 April 2008 he joined the Argentine version of the same show. He has also showed his skills in other international franchises of this show. In 2013 he competed in the Spanish version of Splash!, broadcast on Antena 3.

== Personal life ==
Zubiri is the uncle of footballer Raúl Lizoain.

== Albums ==
- 1987: Inténtalo
- 1988: Pedaleando
- 1991: Detrás del viento
- 1992: Te veo con el corazón
- 1995: Un hombre nuevo
- 2000: Colgado de un sueño
- 2008: Colgado de un sueño (re-release for Argentina)
- 2010: Sigo aquí
- 2012: X una causa justa

== Filmography ==
=== Television appearances ===
Year	Program	Network	Role
2000	Eurocanción	RTVE	Contestant
2000	The Best of Spain at Eurovision	RTVE	Guest
2007	Look Who's Dancing	RTVE	Contestant
2008	Dancing for a Dream	Canal 13 (Argentina)	Contestant
2008	El hormiguero	Cuatro	Guest
2013	Splash!	Telecinco	Contestant
2013	El hormiguero	Antena 3	Guest
2019	Gente Maravillosa	Castilla-La Mancha Media	Guest

Preceded by Sergio Dalma with "Bailar pegados"	Spain in the Eurovision Song Contest; 1992	Succeeded by Eva Santamaría with "Hombres"
Preceded by Lydia with "No quiero escuchar"	Spain in the Eurovision Song Contest; 2000	Succeeded by David Civera with "Dile que la quiero"
