= Belgium in the Eurovision Song Contest 1992 =

- Eurovision Song Contest 1992
- Participating broadcaster: Radio-télévision belge de la Communauté française (RTBF)
- Country: Belgium
- Selection process: Finale nationale du Concours Eurovision de la Chanson 1992
- Selection date: 8 March 1992

Competing entry
- Song: "Nous on veut des violons"
- Artist: Morgane
- Songwriters: Claude Barzotti; Anne-Marie Gaspard

Placement
- Final result: 20th, 11 points

Participation chronology

Belgium was represented at the Eurovision Song Contest 1992 with the song "Nous on veut des violons", composed by Claude Barzotti, with lyrics by Anne-Marie Gaspard, and performed by Morgane. The Belgian participating broadcaster, Walloon Radio-télévision belge de la Communauté française (RTBF), selected its entry through a national final.

== Before Eurovision ==
=== Finale nationale du Concours Eurovision de la Chanson 1992 ===
Walloon broadcaster Radio-télévision belge de la Communauté française (RTBF) had the turn to participate in the Eurovision Song Contest 1992 representing Belgium. RTBF held the national final on 8 March 1992 at 20:05 (CET) in its television studios, hosted by Thierry Luthers. The winner was chosen by five regional juries (Brabant, Hainaut, Liège, Luxembourg, Namur), plus a jury of music professionals. All the juries handed out songs in the same way as is done in the Eurovision Song Contest: 12 points to the top song, 10 points to the second top song, then 8 through to 1 points for the rest of the top ten songs.

Final – 8 March 1992
| R/O | Artist | Song | Songwriter(s) | Points | Place |
|---|---|---|---|---|---|
| 1 | Carole | "Au tour du monde" | Michel Krajewski, André Remy | 27 | 6 |
| 2 | Anne Coster | "Elie" | Anne Coster | 44 | 4 |
| 3 | Jean-Louis Constant Daulne | "Swinguez-vous la vie" | Jean-Louis Constant Daulne | 47 | 3 |
| 4 | Les Malheurs de Sophie | "Les petites filles de Bouddha" | Pascale Constant, John Smets | 24 | 8 |
| 5 | Maïra | "Coup de soleil" | John Smets, Michel Kilesse | 49 | 2 |
| 6 | Morgane | "Nous on veut des violons" | Claude Barzotti, Anne-Marie Gaspard | 61 | 1 |
| 7 | Nathalie and Philippe Laumont | "Douze étoiles en harmonie" | Henri Seroka, Jacques Zegers | 44 | 4 |
| 8 | Fabienne Pétrisse | "Mon mec est dans la finance" | P. Bartholomé, E. Gerstmans | 12 | 10 |
| 9 | Siloé | "Tu es tout au bout de ma chanson" | Pascale Bonheim | 15 | 9 |
| 10 | Françoise Vidick | "Ne me dis pas que tout s'éteint" | Marc Dixon, Didier Dessers, Françoise Vidick | 25 | 7 |

Detailed jury votes
| R/O | Song | Regional Juries | | | | | Professional Jury | Total |
| R/O | Song | Brabant | Hainaut | Liège | Luxembourg | Namur | Professional Jury | Total |
|---|---|---|---|---|---|---|---|---|
| 1 | "Au tour du monde" | 5 | 4 | 5 | 6 | 6 | 1 | 27 |
| 2 | "Elie" | 1 | 10 | 7 | 12 | 7 | 7 | 44 |
| 3 | "Swinguez-vous la vie" | 10 | 7 | 8 | 8 | 4 | 10 | 47 |
| 4 | "Les petites filles de Bouddha" | 6 | 5 | 4 | 2 | 5 | 2 | 24 |
| 5 | "Coup de soleil" | 7 | 8 | 10 | 4 | 8 | 12 | 49 |
| 6 | "Nous on veut des violons" | 12 | 12 | 12 | 7 | 12 | 6 | 61 |
| 7 | "Douze étoiles en harmonie" | 8 | 2 | 6 | 10 | 10 | 8 | 44 |
| 8 | "Mon mec est dans la finance" | 2 | 3 | 1 | 1 | 1 | 4 | 12 |
| 9 | "Tu es tout au bout de ma chanson" | 3 | 1 | 2 | 3 | 3 | 3 | 15 |
| 10 | "Ne me dis pas que tout s'éteint" | 4 | 6 | 3 | 5 | 2 | 5 | 25 |

== At Eurovision ==
The contest was broadcast on RTBF1 (with commentary by Claude Delacroix) and TV1 and TV2 (with commentary by André Vermeulen). It was also broadcast on radio station Radio 2 (with commentary by Marc Brillouet and Julien Put).

Morgane performed 2nd in the running order of the contest, following Spain and preceding Israel. "Nous on veut des violons" received 11 points, placing 20th of 23 countries competing.

=== Voting ===
Points awarded to Belgium
| Score | Country |
|---|---|
| 12 points | |
| 10 points | |
| 8 points | |
| 7 points | |
| 6 points | |
| 5 points | |
| 4 points | Turkey |
| 3 points | France; Spain |
| 2 points | |
| 1 point | Luxembourg |

Points awarded by Belgium
| Score | Country |
|---|---|
| 12 points | United Kingdom |
| 10 points | Malta |
| 8 points | Austria |
| 7 points | Ireland |
| 6 points | Germany |
| 5 points | Switzerland |
| 4 points | Iceland |
| 3 points | Norway |
| 2 points | Netherlands |
| 1 point | Spain |
