= Ireland in the Eurovision Song Contest 1992 =

- Eurovision Song Contest 1992
- Participating broadcaster: Radio Telefís Éireann (RTÉ)
- Country: Ireland
- Selection process: Eurosong '92
- Selection date: 29 March 1992

Competing entry
- Song: "Why Me?"
- Artist: Linda Martin
- Songwriter: Johnny Logan

Placement
- Final result: 1st, 155 points

Participation chronology

Ireland was represented at the Eurovision Song Contest 1992 with the song "Why Me?", written by Johnny Logan, and performed by Linda Martin. The Irish participating broadcaster, Radio Telefís Éireann (RTÉ), selected its entry through Eurosong '92. The entry eventually won the Eurovision Song Contest, becoming the fourth ever victory for Ireland in the contest, and the third by Johnny Logan. Linda Martin had represented Ireland in 1984.

== Before Eurovision ==
=== Eurosong '92 ===
The Irish broadcaster, Radio Telefís Éireann (RTÉ), held a national final, Eurosong '92, to select its entry for the Eurovision Song Contest 1992, held in Malmö, Sweden. The contest was held at the Opera House in Cork on 29 March, hosted by Pat Kenny. Eight songs competed in the contest with the winner being decided through the votes of 10 regional juries.

The winning song was "Why Me?" performed by Linda Martin and composed by two-time winner for Ireland Johnny Logan. Linda Martin had represented Ireland in 1984.

R/O	Artist	Song	Points	Place
1	The Last Word	"Feel the Pain"	79	2
2	Patricia Roe	"Your Love"	79	2
3	Joe O'Meara	"Inside My Restless Heart"	74	4
4	Luv Bug	"Close to Your Heart"	45	8
5	Connor Stevens	"Higher"	66	5
6	Alannah	"Le chéile arís"	53	6
7	Linda Martin	"Why Me?"	105	1
8	Karen Dowling	"Call to Me"	49	7

Detailed Regional Jury Votes
R/O	Song	Athlone	Cork	Dingle	Dublin	Dundalk	Galway	Letterkenny	Limerick	Monaghan	Waterford	Total
1	"Feel the Pain"	3	10	8	7	12	12	4	5	12	6	79
2	"Your Love"	10	6	5	10	7	7	6	10	10	8	79
3	"Inside My Restless Heart"	8	3	10	8	5	6	10	7	5	12	74
4	"Close to Your Heart"	5	5	3	5	6	4	7	4	3	3	45
5	"Higher"	6	8	7	3	10	10	3	8	4	7	66
6	"Le chéile arís"	7	7	6	4	3	5	8	3	6	4	53
7	"Why Me?"	12	12	12	12	8	8	12	12	7	10	105
8	"Call to Me"	4	4	4	6	4	3	5	6	8	5	49

== At Eurovision ==
Martin performed 17th on the night of the contest, following the United Kingdom and preceding Denmark. Martin received 155 points, winning the contest against 23 competing countries. She received three 12 points; however, the second and third placed countries, the United Kingdom and Malta respectively, received more.

The contest was broadcast on both RTÉ 1 and RTÉ Radio 1, with Pat Kenny providing the television commentary and Larry Gogan providing the radio commentary, respectively. RTÉ appointed Eileen Dunne once again as its spokesperson to announce the Irish votes.

=== Voting ===
Points awarded to Ireland
Score	Country
12 points	Greece; Malta; Turkey
10 points	Austria; Denmark; Finland; Germany; Luxembourg; Netherlands; Sweden
8 points	United Kingdom
7 points	Belgium; Iceland; Norway
6 points	Switzerland
5 points	Cyprus
4 points	Portugal
3 points	
2 points	Italy; Yugoslavia
1 point	Spain

Points awarded by Ireland
Score	Country
12 points	Austria
10 points	Malta
8 points	Netherlands
7 points	United Kingdom
6 points	Cyprus
5 points	France
4 points	Yugoslavia
3 points	Turkey
2 points	Germany
1 point	Switzerland
