= Turkey in the Eurovision Song Contest 1992 =

- Eurovision Song Contest 1992
- Participating broadcaster: Turkish Radio and Television Corporation (TRT)
- Country: Turkey
- Selection process: 16. Eurovision Şarkı Yarışması Türkiye Finali
- Selection date: 21 March 1992

Competing entry
- Song: "Yaz Bitti"
- Artist: Aylin Vatankoş
- Songwriters: Aldoğan Şimşekyay; Aylin Uçanlar

Placement
- Final result: 19th, 17 points

Participation chronology

Turkey was represented at the Eurovision Song Contest 1992 with the song "Yaz Bitti", composed by Aldoğan Şimşekyay, with lyrics by Aylin Uçanlar, and performed by Aylin Vatankoş. The Turkish participating broadcaster, the Turkish Radio and Television Corporation (TRT), selected its entry through a national final.

== Before Eurovision ==
=== 16. Eurovision Şarkı Yarışması Türkiye Finali ===
The Turkish broadcaster, the Turkish Radio and Television Corporation (TRT), held a national final to select its entry for the Eurovision Song Contest 1992, to be held in Malmö, Sweden.

TRT held the national final on 21 March 1992 at its studios in Ankara, hosted by Nevin Agiç and Bülend Özveren. Thirteen songs competed and the winner was determined by the votes of eight regional juries.

Final – 21 March 1992
R/O	Artist	Song	Lyricist	Composer	Points	Place
1	Melis Sökmen & Ercüment Vural	"Dön Geri"	Nurhan Gürdil	Tolga Gürdil	62	3
2	Candan Erçetin & Sinan Erkoç	"Ben Seni İsterim"	Metin Özülkü	Mehmet Sezer	26	8
3	Ayşe Gencer	"Şimdi Nerdesin?"	Kamil Özler	Kamil Özler	0	13
4	Savaş Bağcan, Sonat Bağcan & Seda Bağcan	"Sen misin?"	Savaş Bağcan	Savaş Bağcan	7	12
5	Aylin Vatankoş	"Yaz Bitti"	Aylin Uçanlar	Aldoğan Şimşekyay	81	1
6	Grup Piramit	"Yüzde Yüz"	Cem Bezeyiş	Cem Bezeyiş	25	9
7	Grup Bis	"Son Defa"	Zeynep Talu	Figen Çakmak	28	7
8	Deniz Şafak Yaprak	"İnanmam ki"	Semra Öztan	Semra Öztan	59	4
9	Şebnem Özsaran	"Nerdesin?"	Müfit Bayraşa	Müfit Bayraşa	35	6
10	Grup 13.30	"Dans Et"	Meltem Taşkıran	Turhan Yükseler	69	2
11	Sinan Erkoç	"Bu Gece"	Ebru Uzel	Mine Mucur	21	10
12	İbo	"Ölüm"	Karacaoğlan	Mehmet Talat Kurter	13	11
13	Cihan Okan	"Çağırsam Gelir misin?"	Meltem Bal	Aslıgül Ayas	38	5

Detailed Regional Jury Votes
R/O	Song	Ankara	Istanbul	İzmir	Antalya	Mersin	Diyarbakır	Trabzon	Erzurum	Total
1	"Dön Geri"	7	7	1	8	12	8	7	12	62
2	"Ben Seni İsterim"	3	1	2	4	2	7	2	5	26
3	"Şimdi Nerdesin?"									0
4	"Sen misin?"	2					5			7
5	"Yaz Bitti"	12	8	12	12	5	10	12	10	81
6	"Yüzde Yüz"	1	2	3	2	3	6	1	7	25
7	"Son Defa"	8		8	6	1		5		28
8	"İnanmam ki"	6	12	7	7	10	3	8	6	59
9	"Nerdesin?"	5	10	5	3	7		4	1	35
10	"Dans Et"	10	5	6	10	8	12	10	8	69
11	"Bu Gece"		4	4	5	4	1		3	21
12	"Ölüm"		6				2	3	2	13
13	"Çağırsam Gelir misin?"	4	3	10	1	6	4	6	4	38

== At Eurovision ==
Vatankoş performed 4th on the night of the contest, following Israel and preceding Greece. "Yaz Bitti" came 19th in the contest with 17 points.

=== Voting ===
Points awarded to Turkey
Score	Country
12 points	
10 points	
8 points	Malta
7 points	
6 points	Yugoslavia
5 points	
4 points	
3 points	Ireland
2 points	
1 point	

Points awarded by Turkey
Score	Country
12 points	Ireland
10 points	United Kingdom
8 points	Greece
7 points	Netherlands
6 points	Yugoslavia
5 points	Italy
4 points	Belgium
3 points	France
2 points	Israel
1 point	Spain
