= Cyprus in the Eurovision Song Contest 1992 =

- Eurovision Song Contest 1992
- Participating broadcaster: Cyprus Broadcasting Corporation (CyBC)
- Country: Cyprus
- Selection process: Epilogí Kypriakís Symmetochís Gia To Diagonismó Tragoudioú Tis Giourovízion 1992
- Selection date: 13 March 1992

Competing entry
- Song: "Teriazoume"
- Artist: Evridiki
- Songwriter: George Theofanous

Placement
- Final result: 11th, 57 points

Participation chronology

Cyprus was represented at the Eurovision Song Contest 1992 with the song "Teriazoume", written by George Theofanous, and performed by Evridiki. The Cypriot participating broadcaster, the Cyprus Broadcasting Corporation (CyBC), selected its entry through a national final.

== Before Eurovision ==
=== Epilogí Kypriakís Symmetochís Gia To Diagonismó Tragoudioú Tis Giourovízion 1992 ===
==== Competing entries ====
The Cyprus Broadcasting Corporation (CyBC) opened a submission period for Cypriot artists and composers to submit songs until 10 January 1992. By the end of the submission period, 65 entries had been submitted. On 16 February 1992, in the CyBC studios, a 16-member jury listened to the received submissions and chose eight songs to compete in the national final. The selection was done in three stages: first the songs were listened to and the invalid entries were taken out of the contest; then the jury voted and selected 20 entries; and from those 20 entries, the eight competing entries for the national final were selected.

==== Final ====
The final was broadcast live at 21:00 EET on RIK on 13 March in a show titled Epilogí Kypriakís Symmetochís Gia To Diagonismó Tragoudioú Tis Giourovízion 1992 (Greek: Επιλογή Κυπριακής Συμμετοχής Για Το Διαγωνισμό Τραγουδιού Της Γιουροβίζιον 1992). The contest was held at the International Conference Centre in Nicosia, and was hosted by Eirini Charalambidou. The winner was decided by a 24-member jury who each gave out 10 points to their favourite song, 8 to their second favourite, and 6 through to 1 points for their third to eighth placing songs. The jury was intended to have 26 members, consisting of the 16 jury members who chose the competing entries and ten members of the public, however the jury panel ended up only having 24 juries.

Final – 13 March 1992
R/O	Artist	Song	Songwriter(s)	Points	Place
1	Argyro Kaparou and Vasilis Hadjiloukas	"Niotho na me kitas" (Νιώθω να με κοιτάς)	Vasilis Hadjiloukas	53	8
2	Andri Kyriazi	"San" (Σαν)	Stavros Sideras	151	2
3	Alexis	"Si ifesi, la diesi" (Σι ύφεση, λα δίεση)	Vasos Vasileiou, Michalis Chatzimichail	85	5
4	Maria Charalambous	"Neos kosmos" (Νέος Κόσμος)	Michalis Papyrou	123	4
5	Andri Kyriazi	"Anatoli" (Ανατολή)	Andri Kyriazi	85	5
6	Katerina Logotheti	"San mia skia" (Σαν μια σκιά)	Andreas Giorgallis, Podoula Papalamprianou	151	2
7	Andrea Aravi	"Se thimame" (Σε θυμάμαι)	Marios Oikonomidis	60	7
8	Evridiki	"Teriazoume" (Ταιριάζουμε)	Giorgos Theofanous	228	1

Detailed Jury Votes
R/O	Song	Jury																								Total
R/O	Song	1	2	3	4	5	6	7	8	9	10	11	12	13	14	15	16	17	18	19	20	21	22	23	24	Total
1	"Niotho na me kitas"	1	1	1	1	1	1	3	4	1	4	1	6	4	1	2	2	2	1	2	1	1	8	2	2	53
2	"San"	6	6	8	5	5	8	8	5	10	6	10	4	6	5	4	6	5	8	4	8	6	3	5	10	151
3	"Si ifesi, la diesi"	3	3	5	6	6	4	4	2	2	2	2	3	2	2	3	4	3	3	3	5	3	4	6	5	85
4	"Neos kosmos"	10	5	3	3	4	3	5	1	3	3	3	5	3	8	8	8	6	5	8	4	10	5	4	6	123
5	"Anatoli"	5	4	4	4	3	5	1	3	4	1	4	1	1	3	5	3	4	4	5	3	5	6	3	4	85
6	"San mia skia"	4	8	6	10	8	6	6	8	6	8	5	8	8	6	6	5	8	6	6	6	4	2	8	3	151
7	"Se thimame"	2	2	2	2	2	2	2	6	5	5	6	2	5	4	1	1	1	2	1	2	2	1	1	1	60
8	"Teriazoume"	8	10	10	8	10	10	10	10	8	10	8	10	10	10	10	10	10	10	10	10	8	10	10	8	228

== At Eurovision ==
On the night of the final, Evridiki performed ninth in the running order, following Portugal and preceding Malta. At the closing of the voting, "Teriazoume" received 57 points, placing Cyprus 11th out of 23 competing countries. The Cypriot jury awarded its 12 points to Greece.

=== Voting ===
Points awarded to Cyprus
Score	Country
12 points	
10 points	Greece
8 points	Finland; Netherlands; Yugoslavia
7 points	
6 points	Ireland
5 points	
4 points	Italy
3 points	Israel; Norway
2 points	France; Portugal; Switzerland
1 point	Malta

Points awarded by Cyprus
Score	Country
12 points	Greece
10 points	Italy
8 points	Austria
7 points	Netherlands
6 points	United Kingdom
5 points	Ireland
4 points	Israel
3 points	France
2 points	Yugoslavia
1 point	Malta
