= Israel in the Eurovision Song Contest 1992 =

- Eurovision Song Contest 1992
- Participating broadcaster: Israel Broadcasting Authority (IBA)
- Country: Israel
- Selection process: Kdam Eurovision 1992
- Selection date: 28 March 1992

Competing entry
- Song: "Ze Rak Sport"
- Artist: Dafna Dekel
- Songwriters: Kobi Oshrat; Ehud Manor

Placement
- Final result: 6th, 85 points

Participation chronology

Israel was represented at the Eurovision Song Contest 1992 with the song "Ze Rak Sport", composed by Kobi Oshrat, with lyrics by Ehud Manor, and performed by Dafna Dekel. The Israeli participating broadcaster, the Israel Broadcasting Authority (IBA), selected its entry for the contest through Kdam Eurovision 1992.

== Before Eurovision ==
=== Kdam Eurovision 1992 ===
This Israeli broadcaster, the Israel Broadcasting Authority (IBA), held a national final to select its entry for the Eurovision Song Contest 1992, to be held in Malmö, Sweden. IBA held the national final on 28 March 1992 at its television studios in Jerusalem, hosted by Ronnie Yoval and Noam Aviram. 12 songs competed, with the winner being decided through the votes of 7 regional juries.

The winner was Dafna Dekel with the song "Ze Rak Sport", composed by Kobi Oshrat with lyrics by Ehud Manor.

Kdam Eurovision 1992 – 28 March 1992
R/O	Artist	Song	Points	Place
1	Leah Lupatin	"Hayu Li Chalomot"	35	5
2	Uri Fineman	"Ha'or"	33	7
3	Avi Dor	"Tweedledidi Tweedledidam"	20	10
4	Zehava Ben	"Daf Chadash"	3	12
5	Ronen Bahunker	"Yerushalem"	59	3
6	Anat Atzmon	"Hatikva"	60	2
7	Dafna Dekel	"Ze Rak Sport"	61	1
8	Itzik Ben-Ari	"Nagni Harmonica"	15	11
9	Yaron Chadad	"Zodiak"	21	9
10	Irit Anavi	"Hashed Hakatan Sheli"	35	5
11	Shalva Berti	"Mayim"	36	4
12	Eddie Grimberg	"Tel-Aviv Shota Le'chaim"	28	8

Detailed Regional Jury Votes
R/O	Song	Ma'ale Adumim	IDF	Ramat Gan	Kiryat Malakhi	Jerusalem	Kfar Ruppin	Tel Aviv	Total
1	"Hayu li chalomot"	2	5	7	6		12	3	35
2	"Ha'or	7	4	6	7	6	1	2	33
3	"Tweedledidi tweedledidam"	5	6				3	6	20
4	"Daf chadash"				1	2			3
5	"Yerushalem"	12	7	10	12	7	4	7	59
6	"Hatikva"	3	12	5	10	12	10	8	60
7	"Ze rak sport"	10	8	12	5	8	8	10	61
8	"Nagni harmonica"	4	1	2	4	4			15
9	"Zodiak"	1	3	4	2	5	2	4	21
10	"Hashed hakatan sheli"	6	10	1	3	3	7	5	35
11	"Mayim"	8		3	8	10	6	1	36
12	"Tel-Aviv shota le'chaim"		2	8		1	5	12	28
Spokespersons
Ma'ale Adumim – Unknown; IDF – Dan Ofry; Ramat Gan – Alon Ben David; Kiryat Malakhi – Shlomi Eldar; Jerusalem – Amir Chay; Kfar Ruppin – Amnon Peer; Tel Aviv – Dani Lewinstein

== At Eurovision ==
Dekel performed 3rd on the night of the final, following Belgium and preceding Turkey. She received 85 points, placing 6th in a field of 23. Israel was one of the two countries that didn't award points to the eventual winner Ireland, with the other one being France.

=== Voting ===
Points awarded to Israel
Score	Country
12 points	Yugoslavia
10 points	Spain
8 points	France; Luxembourg
7 points	Malta; Portugal; United Kingdom
6 points	
5 points	
4 points	Cyprus; Germany; Sweden; Switzerland
3 points	Netherlands
2 points	Denmark; Norway; Turkey
1 point	Austria

Points awarded by Israel
Score	Country
12 points	France
10 points	Yugoslavia
8 points	Portugal
7 points	Greece
6 points	Denmark
5 points	Netherlands
4 points	Iceland
3 points	Cyprus
2 points	United Kingdom
1 point	Finland
