= Norway in the Eurovision Song Contest 1992 =

- Eurovision Song Contest 1992
- Participating broadcaster: Norsk rikskringkasting (NRK)
- Country: Norway
- Selection process: Melodi Grand Prix 1992
- Selection date: 21 March 1992

Competing entry
- Song: "Visjoner"
- Artist: Merethe Trøan
- Songwriters: Robert Morley; Eva Jansen

Placement
- Final result: 18th, 23 points

Participation chronology

Norway was represented at the Eurovision Song Contest 1992 with the song "Visjoner", composed by Robert Morley, with lyrics by Eva Jansen, and performed by Merethe Trøan. The Norwegian participating broadcaster, Norsk rikskringkasting (NRK), selected its entry through Melodi Grand Prix 1992. At Eurovision, the entry received 23 points, placing her 18th of 23 competing countries.

== Before Eurovision ==
=== Melodi Grand Prix 1992 ===
The Norwegian broadcaster, Norsk rikskringkasting (NRK), continued to use Melodi Grand Prix format to select its entry for Eurovision. NRK held Melodi Grand Prix 1992 on 21 March at the Oslo Spektrum in Oslo, hosted by Elisabeth Andreassen and Jahn Teigen. 10 songs competed and ten regional juries selected the winner. The winner was Merethe Trøan with the song "Visjoner", composed by Robert Morley and Eva Jansen.

Final – 21 March 1992
R/O	Artist	Song	Songwriter(s)	Points	Place
1	Merethe Trøan	"Visjoner"	Robert Morley, Eva Jansen	740	1
2	Ottar "Big Hand" Johansen	"No i natt"	Bård Svendsen, Bjarne Bårdstu	234	7
3	Scandinavia	"Et sted i Scandinavia"	Steinar Storm Kristiansen, Rune Rudberg	329	5
4	Torhild Nigar	"Hjembygd"	Torhild Nigar	234	7
5	Stephen Ackles	"Det er lørdag og rock'n roll"	Hans Uleberg, Stephen Ackles	593	4
6	Anne Karin Kaasa	"Morgongry"	Tore W. Aas, Ragnar Kaasa	278	6
7	Tor Endresen	"Radio Luxembourg"	Tor Endresen, Rolf Løvland	715	2
8	The Contenders	"Munn mot munn-metoden"	Stein Kulseth, Bjørn Kulseth	220	9
9	Wenche Myhre	"Du skal få din dag i morgen"	Per Kristian Indrehus, Geir Olav Bøkestad, Jan Vincents Johannessen	618	3
10	Karl Robert Henie	"Som en bro"	Per Kristian Indrehus, Geir Olav Bøkestad, Trond Brænne	180	10

Detailed Regional Jury Votes
R/O	Song	Porsgrunn	Bergen	Bodø	Stavanger	Ålesund	Elverum	Tromsø	Fredrikstad	Trondheim	Oslo	Total
1	"Visjoner"	59	72	71	72	65	73	70	87	85	86	740
2	"No i natt"	8	16	31	23	21	13	24	30	45	23	234
3	"Et sted i Scandinavia"	34	28	21	30	38	44	46	24	38	26	329
4	"Hjembygd"	18	18	26	35	10	13	33	9	38	34	234
5	"Det er lørdag og rock'n roll"	69	55	56	55	74	56	60	44	64	60	593
6	"Morgongry"	23	32	33	31	24	18	30	21	30	36	278
7	"Radio Luxembourg"	70	88	70	81	81	66	62	70	79	48	715
8	"Munn mot munn-metoden"	16	20	16	18	19	22	21	12	37	39	220
9	"Du skal få din dag i morgen"	69	52	64	68	70	71	51	54	56	63	618
10	"Som en bro"	21	9	15	16	17	11	10	27	12	42	180

== At Eurovision ==
The contest was broadcast on NRK Fjernsynet (with commentary by John Andreassen) and on radio station NRK P2 (with commentary by Leif Erik Forberg and Vidar Lønn-Arnesen). Trøan performed 21st on the night of the contest, following Yugoslavia and preceding Germany. She received 23 points in total, placing 18th in a field of 23.

The members of the Norwegian jury included Sigurd Køhn, Erik Wesseltoft, Tora Ulstrup, Vibeke Wesenlund, Solveig Ravne, Gustavo Pollastri, Mette Lie, Bernt Finseth, Julie Holm, Per Gudim Thorbjørnsen, Tine Mørch Smith, Torill Jordsjø, Jan Paul Brekke, Carl Størmer, Reidar Skår, and Staffan William Olsson.

=== Voting ===
Points awarded to Norway
Score	Country
12 points	
10 points	
8 points	
7 points	
6 points	Denmark
5 points	United Kingdom
4 points	Luxembourg
3 points	Belgium
2 points	Sweden
1 point	Finland; Iceland; Yugoslavia

Points awarded by Norway
Score	Country
12 points	Italy
10 points	France
8 points	Greece
7 points	Ireland
6 points	Denmark
5 points	Spain
4 points	Netherlands
3 points	Cyprus
2 points	Israel
1 point	Iceland
