= Germany in the Eurovision Song Contest 1992 =

- Eurovision Song Contest 1992
- Participating broadcaster: ARD (Note: Arbeitsgemeinschaft der öffentlich-rechtlichen Rundfunkanstalten der Bundesrepublik Deutschland) – Mitteldeutscher Rundfunk (MDR)
- Country: Germany
- Selection process: Ein Lied für Malmö
- Selection date: 30 March 1992

Competing entry
- Song: "Träume sind für alle da"
- Artist: Wind
- Songwriters: Ralph Siegel; Bernd Meinunger

Placement
- Final result: 16th, 27 points

Participation chronology

Germany was represented at the Eurovision Song Contest 1992 with the song "Träume sind für alle da", composed by Ralph Siegel, with lyrics by Bernd Meinunger, and performed by the band Wind. The German participating broadcaster on behalf of ARD, Mitteldeutscher Rundfunk (MDR), selected their entry through a national final. Wind had previously represented Germany in 1985 and 1987 contests with "Für alle" and "Laß die Sonne in dein Herz", coming second both times.

== Before Eurovision ==
=== Ein Lied für Malmö ===
Mitteldeutscher Rundfunk (MDR) held, on behalf ARD, a national final to select their entry for the Eurovision Song Contest 1992, to be held in Malmö, Sweden.

The national final took place on 30 March 1992 at the Rotehornhalle in Magdeburg, hosted by Carmen Nebel. The winner was selected by the votes of regional juries located in the eleven regional ARD broadcasters who each voted for their favourite song. Each jury region consisted of ten television viewers who awarded each song from 1 to 3 points. The entry with the most points received 1 vote.

Final – 30 March 1992
| R/O | Artist | Song | Songwriter(s) | Votes | Place |
|---|---|---|---|---|---|
| 1 | Bernhard Brink | "Der letzte Traum" | Francesco Bruletti, Eugen Römer, Ingrid Reith | 0 | 4 |
| 2 | Relax | "Blue Farewell River" | Claus Mathias-Clamath, Ferdinand Förster, Hans Greiner, Reiner Michl | 0 | 4 |
| 3 | Susan Schubert | "Shalalaika" | Willy Klüter, Anna Rubach | 0 | 4 |
| 4 | Blaue Engel | "Licht am Horizont" | Hendrik Borsitz, Uwe Hiob | 3 | 2 |
| 5 | Lena Valaitis | "Wir seh'n uns wieder" | Ralph Siegel, Bernd Meinunger | 1 | 3 |
| 6 | Wind | "Träume sind für alle da" | Ralph Siegel, Bernd Meinunger | 7 | 1 |

Detailed Regional Jury Votes
| R/O | Song | BR | HR | NDR | ORB | RB | SDR | SFB | SR | SWF | WDR | MDR | Total |
|---|---|---|---|---|---|---|---|---|---|---|---|---|---|
| 1 | "Der letzte Traum" | | | | | | | | | | | | 0 |
| 2 | "Blue Farewell River" | | | | | | | | | | | | 0 |
| 3 | "Shalalaika" | | | | | | | | | | | | 0 |
| 4 | "Licht am Horizont" | X | | | | | | X | | | | X | 3 |
| 5 | "Wir seh'n uns wieder" | | X | | | | | | | | | | 1 |
| 6 | "Träume sind für alle da" | | | X | X | X | X | | X | X | X | | 7 |

== At Eurovision ==
Wind performed 22nd on the night of the contest, following Norway and preceding the Netherlands. "Träume sind für alle da" received 27 points, placing 16th of 23 countries competing.

The contest was broadcast on Erstes Deutsches Fernsehen (with commentary by Jan Hofer) and on SSVC Television. The show was watched by 5.61 million viewers in Germany.

=== Voting ===
Points awarded to Germany
| Score | Country |
|---|---|
| 12 points | |
| 10 points | Portugal |
| 8 points | |
| 7 points | |
| 6 points | Belgium; United Kingdom |
| 5 points | |
| 4 points | |
| 3 points | Denmark |
| 2 points | Ireland |
| 1 point | |

Points awarded by Germany
| Score | Country |
|---|---|
| 12 points | United Kingdom |
| 10 points | Ireland |
| 8 points | Portugal |
| 7 points | Netherlands |
| 6 points | Iceland |
| 5 points | Denmark |
| 4 points | Israel |
| 3 points | France |
| 2 points | Yugoslavia |
| 1 point | Italy |
