= Harald Treutiger =

Swedish journalist and television host

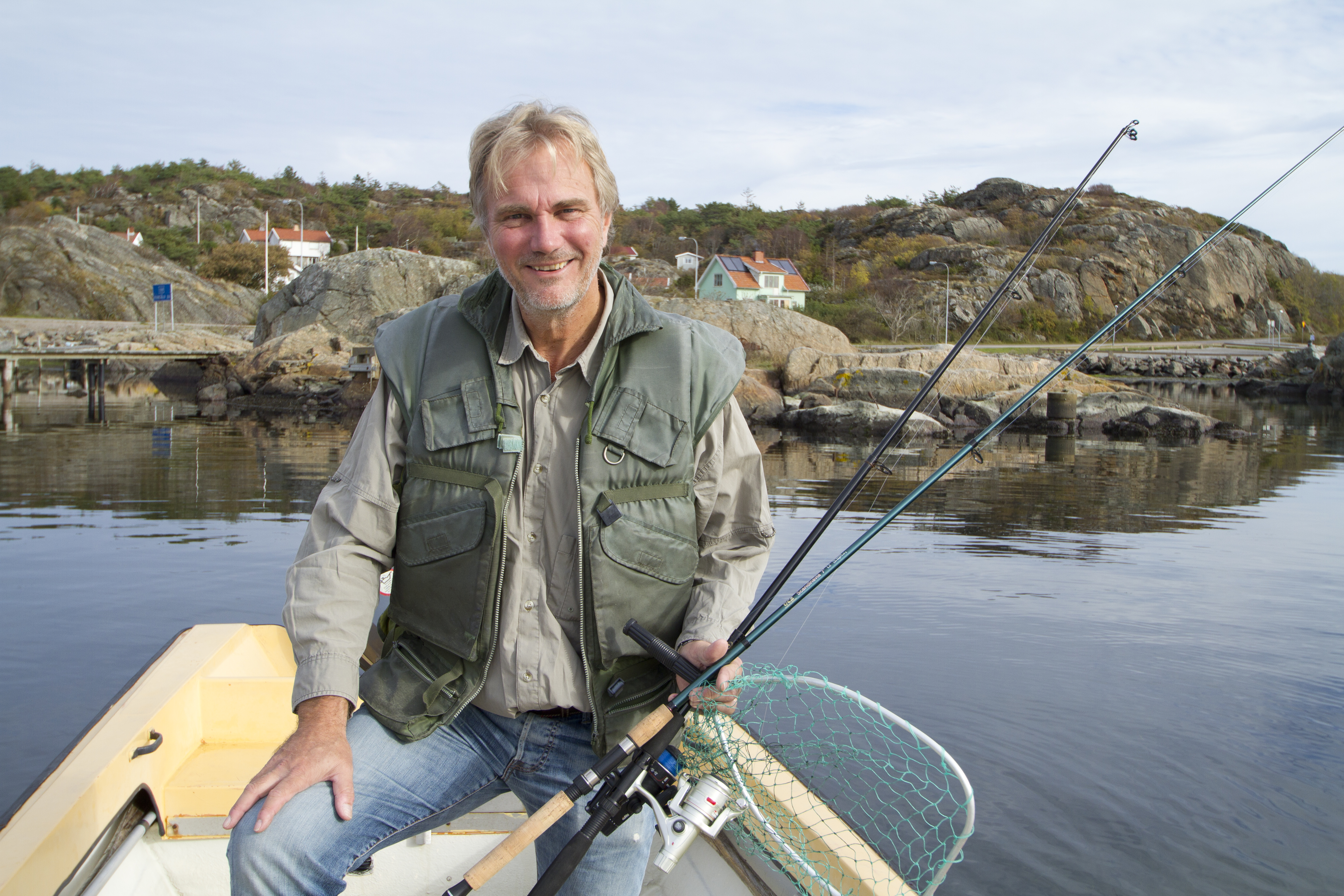
- Treutiger in 2011
- Born: Nils Harald Ossian Treutiger; 5 June 1956 (age 70); Gothenburg, Sweden
- Education: University of Gothenburg
- Occupations: Journalist and TV presenter
- Spouse: Kiki Hultin (m. 1984)
- Children: 2

Nils Harald Ossian Treutiger (born 5 June 1956) is a Swedish journalist and television host. Born in Gothenburg, he is best known for co-hosting the 1992 Eurovision Song Contest held in Malmö after Carola Häggkvist won in 1991.

Treutiger was the first host of Expedition Robinson, internationally known as Survivor, as the show was first aired in Sweden in 1997 before becoming an international franchise. He was replaced by Anders Lundin in 1999 after two seasons.

== See also ==
- List of Eurovision Song Contest presenters

Preceded by (Italy) Toto Cutugno & Gigliola Cinquetti	Eurovision Song Contest presenter (with Lydia Capolicchio); 1992	Succeeded by (Republic of Ireland) Fionnuala Sweeney
