= Kali (French singer) =

French singer

Jean-Marc Monnerville (born 21 February 1959), better known by his stage name Kali, is a French musician from Martinique known for his contributions to Modern Zouk, banjo playing and his work with the Eurovision Song Contest. He is further notable for his often controversial, politically charged lyrics comment on imperialism, slavery and military proliferation.

== Early life ==
Monnerville was born in Fort-de-France on 21 February 1956. His mother, a primary school teacher, and his father, a professional musician, encouraged Jean-Marc to study classical percussion. The nickname "Kali" was developed in primary school in homage to "Kalimero," a well-known cartoon character of the time. Kali's musical career began in earnest when his father sent him to France in the early 1970s to study music composition and theory. His first group, "Gaoule" was symbolically named after a notorious slave massacre carried out in the French West Indies in the 17th century.

"I belong to a very special race / I’m a nigger who was born in France’s overseas ‘department’ / And I’m heavily into the colonial style .... They bent over my cradle and covered me with the flag / Taking everything, even my destiny/ I’d have been better off born an orphan / Oh how many more generations will have to submit to this curse?"

— 6ème Continent, Reggae Dom-Tom

His signature Rasta style developed in 1979 with his sophomore ensemble, 6ème Continent. Their notable singles included an iconoclastic version of "Adieu Foulards" and "Reggae Dom-Tom", a hard-hitting song which evoked the difficult relationship between France and its former colony. In June 1983, 6ème Continent rose to national prominence when they stepped in to replace the Nigerian singer Femi Kuti at the "Fète de la Musique." Playing on an open-air stage erected on the Place du Trocadéro, 6ème Continent proved an enormous hit. After being asked to "modernize their sound" by CBS Records (the international name of Columbia Records), Monnerville made the executive decision to split up the group.

== Developing career ==
Kali returned to Martinique to start a solo career, intentionally ignoring the popular "Zouk" craze and focusing on traditional music of the West Indies. This return to musical heritage was further explored on the albums "Racines I" (1989) and "Racines II" (1990) by fusing acoustic piano and banjo with percussion and synthesizers. After returning to Paris for a live performance in 1990, he was selected to represent France in the Eurovision Song Contest 1992. His performance, the original composition Monté la riviè (Going up the River) was regarded by fellow contestants to be "an absolute surprise" for its offbeat subject matter and inclusion of the banjo. While the French entry ranked 8th among 23, his performance garnered major popularity and helped the sales of his next album "Lese la Te Tounen" (Let the Earth Move). In 1994 he won an award from the Sacem (French Association of Songwriters and Composers), citing his composition "Pan Patchew" as "Best Song of the Year in the Music from the French West Indies."

== Recent Music ==
His 1995 album "Débranché" (Unplugged), reverts to a purely acoustic sound. Following the record's success, Kali was invited to perform in Zimbabwe where he joined other musicians celebrating the Centenary of the first anti-colonial insurrection. "Racines IV," a 1998 album, celebrated the artist's comeback to traditional West Indian music since 1992. In 2002, Kali commemorated the centenary of the eruption of the Pelée volcano with "Bèlè Boum Bap." The fifth album in the "Racines Caraïbes" series was released in November 2007, featuring guest performances by Jocelyne Beroard, Tanya Saint-Val, Emeline Michel and Ralph Thamar.

== Discography ==
As Gaoulé:

Year	Title
1975	"Gaoulé 75"

As 6eme Continent:

Year	Title
1979	"6eme Continent"

As Kali:

Year	Title
1989	Racines I
1990	Racines II
1992	Roots
1993	Ile a Vendre
1993	Lesse La Te Tounen
1995	Débranché
1996	Racines Noël, III
1998	Kali au New Morning
1999	Francofaune
2000	Racines IV
2002	Bèlè Boum Bap
2007	Racines V
2007	Weapons of Mass Destruction
2010	Le Trio

Preceded by Amina with C'est le dernier qui a parlé qui a raison	France in the Eurovision Song Contest; 1992	Succeeded by Patrick Fiori with Mama Corsica
