= Fionnuala Sweeney =

Irish anchorwoman and reporter

- Born: Fionnuala Sweeney; Belfast, Northern Ireland
- Occupation: Television journalist
- Notable credit(s): CNN Newsroom and International Desk

Fionnuala Sweeney (/fɪˈnuːlə/ fin-OO-lə, Irish: [ˈfʲɪn̪ˠuəlˠə]) is an Irish anchorwoman and reporter. Based at CNN's headquarters in Atlanta and at CNN London, Fionnuala was also the solo host of the Eurovision Song Contest from Millstreet, County Cork.

== Early life and education ==
Fionnuala was born in Belfast, Northern Ireland, where she lived until she was 12, before moving to Dublin.

== Career ==
=== Radio ===
Fionnuala's career in broadcasting began as newscaster on Chris Cary's Energy Power 103 FM, a "Superpirate" in Dublin where she was a co-presenter on "Wake Up With Energy" along with Pat Courtenay and Bob Gallico. She left Energy to work as a newscaster at RTÉ 2FM before becoming a television reporter with RTÉ news. In early 2018, she returned to the RTÉ airwaves to co-present the political commentary show Late Debate [www.rte.ie/radio1/latedebate] on RTÉ Radio 1 at 10pm.

=== Television journalism ===
While a television journalist at RTÉ, Fionnuala was the sole host of the 38th Eurovision Song Contest. She then moved to CNN, where she was an anchor at CNN Headquarters in Atlanta, before relocating with CNN to London where she anchored World News Europe (and briefly World One), regularly traveling on assignment as a reporter to the Middle East and Europe. She also hosted Design 360, a program looking at the creative process, the social context, the business perspective and the influence of design throughout and beyond Europe.

She was named the anchor of Your World Today. and, in addition, anchored International Correspondents, a weekly behind the scenes look at the stories making global news, before returning to Atlanta to host CNN Newsroom and serving as the primary substitute on The International Desk.

== Awards ==
In 2006, Sweeney anchored and reported from Haifa during the Israel-Hezbollah war, for which CNN received an Edward R. Murrow Award. In 2012, she was part of the news team that won an Emmy in the Outstanding Live Coverage of a Current News Story – Long Form category at the 33rd Annual News and Documentary Emmy Awards for the 2011 broadcast CNN Breaking News: Revolution in Egypt – President Mubarak Steps Down. The coverage also won the network a Peabody Award. The same year she was part of the team nominated for another Emmy in the same category for the 2011 broadcast CNN Breaking News: Libya Revolution – Rebels Enter Tripoli and Gadhafi Compound.

== See also ==
- List of Eurovision Song Contest presenters

Preceded by (Sweden) Harald Treutiger & Lydia Capolicchio	Eurovision Song Contest presenter 1993	Succeeded by (Republic of Ireland) Gerry Ryan & Cynthia Ní Mhurchú
