= Finland in the Eurovision Song Contest 1992 =

- Eurovision Song Contest 1992
- Participating broadcaster: Yleisradio (Yle)
- Country: Finland
- Selection process: Euroviisut 1992
- Selection date: 29 February 1992

Competing entry
- Song: "Yamma, yamma"
- Artist: Pave Maijanen
- Songwriters: Pave Maijanen; Hector

Placement
- Final result: 23rd, 4 points

Participation chronology

Finland was represented at the Eurovision Song Contest 1992 with the song "Yamma, yamma", composed by Pave Maijanen, with lyrics by Hector, and performed by Maijanen himself. The Finnish participating broadcaster, Yleisradio (Yle), selected its entry in the contest through a national final.

== Before Eurovision ==
=== Euroviisut 1992 ===
Ten entries were selected for the competition from 435 submissions received during a submission period as well as from composers and music publishers directly invited by the Finnish broadcaster, Yleisradio (Yle). Yle held a national final to select its entry for the Eurovision Song Contest 1992, held in Malmö, Sweden. Yle held Euroviisut 1992 at the Typhon Hall in Turku on 29 February, hosted by Kati Bergman. The winner was decided through two rounds of jury voting, the first to select the top four songs, with the second selecting the winner. In the second round, each juror distributed their points as follows: 1, 2, 4 and 6 points

In addition to the performances of the competing entries, the interval acts featured Ten Sharp performing "You" and "Ain't My Beating Heart", and Bonnie Tyler performing "Against the Wind" and "Bitterblue".

First Round – 29 February 1992
R/O	Artist	Song	Songwriter(s)	Result
1	Arja Koriseva	"Huomiseen"	Cris Owen, Hector	—N/a
2	Pepe Willberg	"Kaukaa kaipaan"	Esa Juutilainen, Petter Ohls	—N/a
3	Sonja Lumme	"Rakkauden bulevardi"	Matti Puurtinen, Turkka Mali	Advanced
4	Kirka	"Antaa menneisyyden mennä"	Kisu Jernström, Kassu Halonen, Vexi Salmi	—N/a
5	Tauski Peltonen	"Lauluni sinulle"	Tauski Peltonen	—N/a
6	Leena Nilsson	"Soita kitaraa"	Jarmo Nikku, Jokke Seppälä, Jukka Välimaa	Advanced
7	Rexi Kero and Kaija Pohjola	"Ruskaa näin sinun silmissäs"	Rexi Kero, Hannele Miilumäki	—N/a
8	Pave Maijanen	"Yamma, yamma"	Pave Maijanen, Hector	Advanced
9	Riki Sorsa	"Silmiisi sun"	Kim Engblom, Janne Engblom, Pia Partanen	Advanced
10	Kikka	"Parhaat puoleni"	Veikko Samuli, Ilkka Vainio, Aappo I. Piippo	—N/a

Second Round – 29 February 1992
R/O	Artist	Song	Benny Törnroos	Antti Holma	Markus Ollikainen	Arto Alaspää	Erkki Lehtola	Kaj Lunden-Welden	Irina Milan	Esa Nieminen	Martin Timell	Seppo Matintalo	Kata Laurikainen	Total	Place
1	Sonja Lumme	"Rakkauden bulevardi"	4	2	2	4	2	2	1	1	2	2	2	24	3
2	Leena Nilsson	"Soita kitaraa"	1	1	4	1	4	4	4	4	4	4	4	35	2
3	Pave Maijanen	"Yamma, yamma"	6	6	6	6	6	6	6	6	6	6	6	66	1
4	Riki Sorsa	"Silmiisi sun"	2	4	1	2	1	1	2	2	1	1	1	18	4

== At Eurovision ==
Maijanen performed 12th on the night of the contest, following Iceland and preceding Switzerland. Maijanen was accompanied by Pirjo Aittomäki, Sini Heinilä and Anita Pajunen as backing vocalists. "Yamma, yamma" received 4 points, placing last of 23 countries competing.

Among the members of the Finnish jury was Vicky Rosti, who represented Finland in the 1987 contest.

=== Voting ===
Points awarded to Finland
Score	Country
12 points	
10 points	
8 points	
7 points	
6 points	
5 points	
4 points	
3 points	Yugoslavia
2 points	
1 point	Israel

Points awarded by Finland
Score	Country
12 points	Italy
10 points	Ireland
8 points	Cyprus
7 points	France
6 points	United Kingdom
5 points	Greece
4 points	Yugoslavia
3 points	Spain
2 points	Portugal
1 point	Norway
