= Linda Martin =

Irish singer (born 1952)

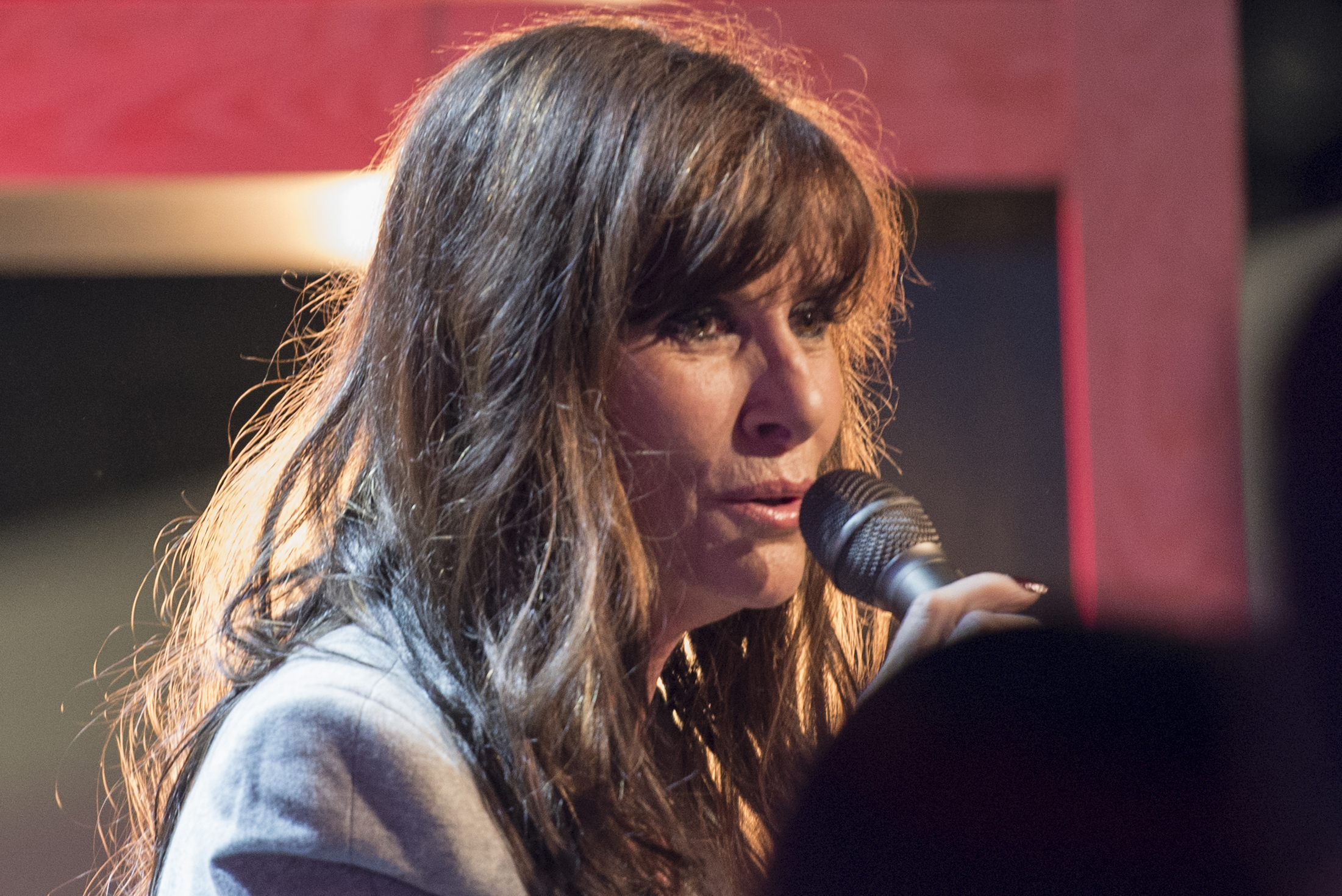
- Martin in May 2013

Background information
- Born: 27 March 1952 (age 74); Belfast, Northern Ireland
- Genres: Pop, pop-rock, MOR
- Years active: 1969–present
- Labels: CBS, Polydor, Rex, Spider, WEA

Linda Martin (born 27 March 1952) is a singer and television presenter from Northern Ireland. She is best known as the winner of the Eurovision Song Contest 1992 during which she represented Ireland with the song "Why Me?", the first of a record three consecutive wins by Ireland. She is also known within Ireland as a member of the band Chips.

== Early life and family ==
Born in Belfast in 1952, Martin is of Irish, Scottish and Italian ancestry. Her father's family's surname was originally Martini. Her paternal great-grandfather Francis Martini was born in Dublin to immigrants from Saronno, north of Milan, Italy. Two of Martin's maternal great-grandparents, William Green and Elizabeth Nangle, had a coal-mining background; they had transferred to Belfast from Larkhall, Scotland.

== Career ==
=== Chips ===
Martin began her musical career when she joined the band Chips in Omagh in 1969. They quickly became one of the top bands in Ireland on the live circuit, and released hit singles "Love Matters", "Twice a Week" and "Goodbye Goodbye" during the mid-to-late 1970s. In 1972, Martin left Chips to be a vocalist with new group Lyttle People, but rejoined her former bandmates the following year.

The group appeared on Opportunity Knocks in 1974 and appeared a number of times on British television promoting their singles, but never scored a UK hit. With multiple entries to the Irish National finals of the Eurovision Song Contest, the band carried on into the 1980s. They scored a final Irish hit in 1982 with "David's Song (Who'll Come With Me)", after which Martin left when she won the Castlebar Song Contest with "Edge of the Universe" in 1983. From this point, she concentrated on a solo career as well as occasional live appearances with Chips as her backing band.

=== Eurovision Song Contest ===
She participated in the National Song Contest four times as a member of Chips; however, they did not score successfully. She participated another four times in the contest as a soloist and once more as part of the group 'Linda Martin and Friends'. With nine participations, she has been the most frequent entrant in the National Song Contest's history. She won the contest twice, going on to represent Ireland twice at the Eurovision Song Contest.

The first of these victories was in 1984 with the song "Terminal 3", written by Johnny Logan (under his real name Séan Sherrard). The song came second in the final, being beaten by eight points. "Terminal 3" reached No. 7 in the Irish charts. The second victory was in 1992 when her song "Why Me" (also written by Logan) went on to win the final in Sweden. This became Ireland's fourth victory in the Eurovision Song Contest, and the song reached No. 1 in the Irish chart as well as becoming a hit in many European countries.

Martin was, at the time, one of only three artists to finish both first and second at Eurovision, behind Lys Assia and Gigliola Cinquetti. Since then, only Elisabeth Andreassen and Dima Bilan have achieved this, raising the number to five. Martin was the first of the three artists to finish second first and first second, matched only later by Bilan.

=== Television ===
Martin was one of the hosts on the RTÉ quiz show The Lyrics Board, and also served as one of Louis Walsh's behind-the-scenes team on the first series of ITV's The X Factor.

She also served as a judge on the first, second and fourth seasons of RTÉ's You're a Star and on Charity You're a Star in summer 2005 and summer 2006. While she was dismissed from later seasons, speaking on Saturday Night with Miriam on RTÉ television on 28 July 2007, she said that she was "open" to being invited back on to the show. Martin did not rule out a return to Eurovision following Ireland's dismal performance in the 2007 contest finishing last with only five points.

She was a guest performer at Congratulations, the 50th anniversary Eurovision concert in Copenhagen, Denmark, in October 2005. Martin was also the Irish spokesperson for Eurovision Song Contest 2007 and was one of the five judges for Eurosong 2009 (Irish Selection for Eurovision). In 2012, she was the mentor for Jedward in the Irish Eurovision final Eurosong 2012.

During the interval of Eurovision 2013, the host Petra Mede presented a light-hearted history of the contest, during which she explained to viewers that Johnny Logan had won the competition three times, in 1980, 1987 and 1992. Appearing alongside Linda Martin in some vintage footage she joked that he had won the third time disguised as a woman, saying, "I recognise a drag queen when I see one". The joke proved controversial, particularly in the Irish media. However, on 1 June 2013, during an appearance on RTÉ's The Saturday Night Show Martin said that she had actually benefited from all the publicity. On the same show she performed a cover of the song "Get Lucky" by Daft Punk.

=== Theatre ===
Martin has also appeared in pantomime, in Dublin. She starred in Cinderella as the Wicked Stepmother, Snow White as the Evil Queen and Robin Hood as herself, at the Olympia Theatre.

She toured Menopause the Musical with Irish entertainer Twink. While on tour, Twink described Martin as a "cunt" during a tirade in May 2010. The two had been friends for 30 years but both said afterwards that they had no plans to speak to each other again.

== Selected discography ==
=== Singles with Chips ===
Date	Single	Irish Charts
1971	"Today I Killed a Man"	-
1971	"Sock It to 'Em Sister Nell"	-
1973	"Open Your Eyes"	-
1974	"King Kong"(as Lily and Chips)	-
1974	"My World"	-
1975	"Love Matters"	6
1975	"Twice a Week"	13
1976	"I'm a Song (Sing Me)"	-
1977	"Shine a Light"	-
1977	"Goodbye Goodbye"	2
1978	"Here in My Arms" (or "It's Over")	-
1978	"The Sooner The Better"	-
1980	"Automobile"	-
1981	"New Romance (It's a Mystery)"	-
1982	"David's Song (Who'll Come With Me)"	13
1982	"Hi-Lowe"	-

=== Singles (solo) ===
Date	Single	Record label	Irish Charts
1983	"Edge of the Universe"	Lunar	20
1984	"Terminal 3"	CBS	7
1984	"Body Works"	CBS	19
1987	"Miles of Eyes"	Mystery records	-
1988	"Liffey Tinker"	Plaza	-
1988	"Hiding from Love"	EMI	22
1989	"Impossible to Do"	Plaza	-
1990	"Where the Boys Are"	K-Tel	19
1991	"Did You Ever?" (with Mick McCarthy)	K-Tel	15
1992	"Why Me?"	Columbia	1
2016	"Why Me? Remixed"	Energise	-
2017	"Won't Stop"	Powerworld Music	-

- "Why Me?" also reached No. 59 on the UK Singles Chart and No. 29 on the Dutch Singles Chart.

== Personal life ==
Martin was in a relationship with the musician Paul Lyttle from the early 1970s to the mid-1980s.

Since her childhood in east Belfast, Martin has nurtured an interest in animals and now operates a dog sanctuary in north Dublin.

In February 2025, Martin revealed that she had been approached by an unnamed political party to run in the 2025 Irish presidential election.

== See also ==
- List of people on the postage stamps of Ireland (1997)

Awards and achievements
Preceded by (Sweden) Carola with "Fångad av en stormvind"	Winner of the Eurovision Song Contest; 1992	Succeeded by (Republic of Ireland) Niamh Kavanagh with "In Your Eyes"
Preceded by The Duskeys with "Here Today Gone Tomorrow"	Ireland in the Eurovision Song Contest; 1984	Succeeded by Maria Christian with "Wait Until The Weekend Comes"
Preceded by Kim Jackson with "Could It Be That I'm In Love"	Ireland in the Eurovision Song Contest; 1992	Succeeded by Niamh Kavanagh with "In Your Eyes"
Preceded by Gay Byrne	Eurovision Song Contest Ireland Commentator; 1985	Succeeded by Gerry Ryan
