= Merethe Trøan =

- Born: 19 May 1970 (age 55)
- Origin: Trondheim, Norway
- Genres: Pop
- Occupation: Singer

Merethe Trøan (born 19 May 1970) is a Norwegian singer, best known for her participation in the 1992 Eurovision Song Contest.

In her teens, Trøan and her sister were members of vocal group Pastel together with two brothers (not related to the Trøans). In 1985, Pastel took part in the Norwegian Eurovision Song Contest selection, Melodi Grand Prix, with the song "Ring Ring Ring" finishing third. Pastel released one self-titled LP before disbanding. In 1992, Trøan returned to MGP as a solo artist, and this time was successful with the song "Visjoner" being chosen as the Norwegian entry for the 37th Eurovision Song Contest, held in Malmö, Sweden on 9 May. "Visjoner" did not prove very successful, managing only 18th place of 23 entries, although Trøan's performance is remembered for a spontaneous giggle midway through the song.

Trøan subsequently took up work as a voice actor, her credits including the Norwegian versions of Disney's Beauty and the Beast and The Jungle Book 2.

Awards and achievements
| Preceded by Just 4 Fun with "Mrs. Thompson" | Norway in the Eurovision Song Contest; 1992 | Succeeded by Silje Vige with "Alle mine tankar" |
| Preceded by (Norway) Wenche Myhre | OGAE Second Chance Contest winner 1993 | Succeeded by (Sweden) Gladys Del Pilar |
