= United Kingdom in the Eurovision Song Contest 1992 =

- Eurovision Song Contest 1992
- Participating broadcaster: British Broadcasting Corporation (BBC)
- Country: United Kingdom
- Selection process: Artist: Internal selection Song: A Song for Europe 1992
- Selection date: 3 April 1992

Competing entry
- Song: "One Step Out of Time"
- Artist: Michael Ball
- Songwriters: Paul Davies; Tony Ryan; Victor Stratton

Placement
- Final result: 2nd, 139 points

Participation chronology

The United Kingdom was represented at the Eurovision Song Contest 1992 with the song "One Step Out of Time", written by Paul Davies, Tony Ryan, and Victor Stratton, and performed by Michael Ball. The British participating broadcaster, the British Broadcasting Corporation (BBC), selected its entry through a national final, after having previously selected the performer internally.

== Before Eurovision ==
=== Artist selection ===
The British Broadcasting Corporation (BBC) continued to use a national final A Song for Europe to select its entry. For 1992, the multi-artist format utilized since 1976 was dropped in favor of a single artist performing several songs as from 1964 to 1975. Michael Ball was revealed by the BBC as its entrant for the Eurovision Song Contest 1992.

=== A Song for Europe 1992 ===
Two songs each were premiered during the four broadcasts of Wogan on BBC1 between 8 and 30 March 1992, and were later featured in various programmes on BBC Radio 2.

Eight songs, all performed by Michael Ball, competed in the televised final on 3 April 1992 held at the BBC's TVC3 Studio in London and hosted by Terry Wogan. The show was broadcast on BBC1 and BBC Radio 2 with commentary by Ken Bruce. The performances were filmed earlier on 2 April 1992 and a public televote selected the winning song, "One Step Out of Time", which was revealed during a separate show broadcast on BBC1 and hosted by Terry Wogan.

Paul Curtis' song was a last minute replacement for an unnamed song that was either disqualified or withdrawn. It was Curtis' 22nd and last song to feature in the British national finals for Eurovision; a record for any songwriter. It was the only one of the eight songs that Michael Ball did not record.

A Song for Europe 1992 – 3 April 1992
R/O	Song	Songwriter(s)	Televote	Place
1	"This Is the Moment I've Been Waiting For"	Paul Curtis	73,084	5
2	"Call On Me"	Ian Allen, Dave Keates	48,419	7
3	"As Dreams Go By"	Andy Hill, Peter Sinfield	94,844	2
4	"Secret of Love"	Ian Allen, Dave Keates	91,705	3
5	"Every Day, Every Night"	Karen Boddington, Robin Smith	32,007	8
6	"Who Needs to Know"	Ronnie Bond	52,126	6
7	"One Step Out of Time"	Paul Davies, Tony Ryan, Victor Stratton	153,792	1
8	"If You Need Another Love"	John Miles	86,476	4

== At Eurovision ==
Ball performed 16th on the night of the contest, following Austria and preceding Ireland. He received 139 points, placing 2nd in a field of 23.

=== Voting ===
Points awarded to the United Kingdom
Score	Country
12 points	Austria; Belgium; Denmark; Germany
10 points	France; Turkey
8 points	Italy; Switzerland
7 points	Ireland; Luxembourg; Netherlands
6 points	Cyprus; Finland; Malta
5 points	Spain; Sweden
4 points	Iceland
3 points	
2 points	Israel
1 point	

Points awarded by the United Kingdom
Score	Country
12 points	Iceland
10 points	Austria
8 points	Ireland
7 points	Israel
6 points	Germany
5 points	Norway
4 points	Switzerland
3 points	Denmark
2 points	Netherlands
1 point	Spain
