= Jovan Adamov =

Serbian composer and conductor

- Born: May 5, 1942 (age 84); Čoka, Serbia
- Occupations: Composer; conductor

Jovan Adamov (born 5 May 1942, Čoka) is a Serbian composer and conductor, best remembered as the conductor of the famous children's show "Muzički tobogan".

== Biography ==
Although he graduated as a mechanical engineer, Jovan "Joca" Adamov dedicated his life to music, working at Radio Television of Vojvodina (formerly RT Novi Sad).

He received his musical education in Novi Sad and has been involved in music since 1962. He was a double bassist and occasional conductor of the Dance Orchestra of Radio Novi Sad, where he was a music producer for many years. As a composer of entertaining melodies, he has participated in many Yugoslav festivals since 1964. In addition to schlagers, old town songs, and romances, he wrote film and stage music. He is a recipient of numerous awards.

== Main works ==
- Old town songs and romances
  - "Room in Varadin"
  - "We Met"
  - "Things That Have Passed"
  - "Why I Met You"
- Schlagers
  - "Hey Why Am I"
  - "Hey Soldiers Aviators"
  - "Little Words Are Needed When You Love"
  - "Unfinished Thoughts"
  - "Let It Not Be in Spring" (sung by Ljiljana Petrović)
  - "We Will Never Allow Our Love to End"
  - "A Summer Story"
  - "You Passed by Love"
  - "Colorful Displays"
  - "What Good Is It That I'm Handsome"
  - "Forget"
  - "I Know"
  - "Live Without Me"

== Works ==
- Gabi Novak: "Little Words Are Needed When You Love"
- Ljiljana Petrović: "Let It Not Be in Spring", "Do Not Play, Wind"
- Leo Martin: "We Will Never Allow Our Love to End"
- Ratko Kraljević: "One Star", "All Days"
- Maja Odžaklijevska: "Moon's Dream"

== See also ==
- Minja Subota
