= Lydia Capolicchio =

Swedish journalist and hostess

Lydia Capolicchio (born 7 January 1964) is a Swedish journalist and hostess.

Born in Borås, Sweden to an Italian father and a Slovenian mother, Capolicchio is best known for hosting the Eurovision Song Contest 1992, alongside Harald Treutiger, held in Malmö. In 2001 she hosted the Miss Sweden pageants.

== See also ==
- List of Eurovision Song Contest presenters

Preceded by (Italy) Toto Cutugno & Gigliola Cinquetti	Eurovision Song Contest presenter (with Harald Treutiger); 1992	Succeeded by (Republic of Ireland) Fionnuala Sweeney
