= Iceland in the Eurovision Song Contest 1992 =

- Eurovision Song Contest 1992
- Participating broadcaster: Ríkisútvarpið (RÚV)
- Country: Iceland
- Selection process: Söngvakeppni Sjónvarpsins 1992
- Selection date: 22 February 1992

Competing entry
- Song: "Nei eða já"
- Artist: Heart 2 Heart
- Songwriters: Friðrik Karlsson; Grétar Örvarsson; Stefán Hilmarsson

Placement
- Final result: 7th, 80 points

Participation chronology

Iceland was represented at the Eurovision Song Contest 1992 with the song "Nei eða já", composed by Friðrik Karlsson and Grétar Örvarsson, with lyrics by Stefán Hilmarsson, and performed by the band Heart 2 Heart. The Icelandic participating broadcaster, Ríkisútvarpið (RÚV), selected its entry through Söngvakeppni Sjónvarpsins 1992.

== Before Eurovision ==
=== Söngvakeppni Sjónvarpsins 1992 ===
The Icelandic broadcaster, Ríkisútvarpið (RÚV), held a national final to select its entry for the Eurovision Song Contest 1992 - Söngvakeppni Sjónvarpsins 1992. RÚV held the national final on 22 February 1992 at its television studios in Reykjavík, hosted by Sigrún Waage. Nine songs competed, with the winner being decided through the votes of eight regional juries and a professional jury. The winner was Sigríður Beinteinsdóttir and Sigrún Eva Ármannsdottir with the song "Nei eða já", composed by Friðrik Karlsson, Grétar Örvarsson, and Stefán Hilmarsson. Sigríður had previously represented Iceland in 1990 as a member of Stjórnin with "Eitt lag enn".

Final – 22 February 1992
R/O	Artist	Song	Points	Place
1	Arnar Freyr Gunnarsson	"Eva"	36	7
2	Margét Eir	"Þú mátt mig engu leyna"	43	6
3	Helga Möller and Karl Örvarsson	"Þú, um þig, frá þér, til þín"	30	8
4	Bjarni Arason	"Karen"	80	2
5	Gylfi Már Hilmisson	"Nótt sem dag"	24	9
6	Sigríður Beinteinsdóttir and Sigrún Eva Ármannsdottir	"Nei eða já"	92	1
7	Guðrún Gunnarsdóttir	"Ljósdimma nótt"	51	4
8	Björgvin Halldórsson	"Mig dreymir"	68	3
9	Helga Möller and Karl Örvarsson	"Einfalt mál"	48	5

Detailed Jury Votes
R/O	Song	West	Westfjords	Northwest	Northeast	East	South	Reykjanes	Reykjavík	Professionals	Total
1	"Eva"	5	5	3	8	2	5	6	2		36
2	"Þú mátt mig engu leyna"	3	4	5	6	7	6	7	5		43
3	"Þú, um þig, frá þér, til þín"	6	3	4	2	3	2	4	6		30
4	"Karen"	10	10	10	10	12	8	8	12		80
5	"Nótt sem dag"	4	2	2	3	5	3	2	3		24
6	"Nei eða já"	12	12	12	12	10	12	12	10		92
7	"Ljósdimma nótt"	8	7	8	7	6	4	3	8		51
8	"Mig dreymir"	7	6	6	5	4	7	10	7	16	68
9	"Einfalt mál"	2	8	7	4	8	10	5	4		48

== At Eurovision ==
Sigríður and Sigrún performed for Iceland along with Grétar Örvarsson and Friðrik Karlsson as Heart 2 Heart. The group performed 11th on the night of the contest, following Malta and preceding Finland, and received 80 points for their performance of "Nei eða ja", placing 7th of 23 competing countries.

=== Voting ===
Points awarded to Iceland
Score	Country
12 points	United Kingdom
10 points	
8 points	Spain
7 points	Austria
6 points	Germany; Greece; Portugal; Sweden
5 points	Denmark; Italy; Luxembourg
4 points	Belgium; Israel
3 points	Switzerland
2 points	Netherlands
1 point	Norway

Points awarded by Iceland
Score	Country
12 points	Switzerland
10 points	Italy
8 points	Malta
7 points	Ireland
6 points	Denmark
5 points	Yugoslavia
4 points	United Kingdom
3 points	Netherlands
2 points	Greece
1 point	Norway
