= Kati Bergman =

Finnish singer and actress

- Born: 12 December 1959 (age 66)
- Occupations: Singer, pianist, actress, television presenter, radio presenter

Kati Bergman (born 12 December 1959) is a Finnish singer, pianist, actress and radio and television presenter for Yle. She is married to Finnish singer Jukka Tapio Karjalainen.

Bergman is known for hosting Euroviisut (Finnish heats for the Eurovision Song Contest), Rockradio and Mutapainin ystävät.
