= Denmark in the Eurovision Song Contest 1992 =

- Eurovision Song Contest 1992
- Participating broadcaster: Danmarks Radio (DR)
- Country: Denmark
- Selection process: Dansk Melodi Grand Prix 1992
- Selection date: 29 February 1992

Competing entry
- Song: "Alt det som ingen ser"
- Artist: Lotte Nilsson and Kenny Lübcke
- Songwriter: Carsten Warming

Placement
- Final result: 12th, 47 points

Participation chronology

Denmark was represented at the Eurovision Song Contest 1992 with the song "Alt det som ingen ser", written by Carsten Warming, and performed by Lotte Nilsson and Kenny Lübcke. The Danish participating broadcaster, Danmarks Radio (DR), organised the Dansk Melodi Grand Prix 1992 in order to select its entry for the contest.

== Before Eurovision ==
=== Dansk Melodi Grand Prix 1992 ===
Danmarks Radio (DR) held the Dansk Melodi Grand Prix 1992 on 29 February 1992 at the Aalborghallen in Aalborg, hosted by Anne-Cathrine Herdorf and Anders Frandsen. The winner was selected over two rounds of public televoting. In the first round, the top five entries were selected to proceed to the second round. In the second round, the results of the public televote were revealed by Denmark's regions and led to the victory of Lotte Nilsson and Kenny Lübcke with the song "Alt det som ingen ser".

The show was watched by 2.52 million viewers in Denmark, making it the most popular show of the week.

First Round – 29 February 1992
R/O	Artist	Song	Songwriter(s)	Result
1	Bebiane Jacobsen	"Til en ven"	Finn Skovgaard Olsen	—N/a
2	Dorthe Andersen	"Vild med dig"	Turid Nørlund Christensen, Hanne Juhl Petersen	—N/a
3	Lotte Nilsson and Kenny Lübcke	"Alt det som ingen ser"	Carsten Warming	Advanced
4	Anne Karin and Hans Dal	"Som jeg ser dig"	Hans Dal	—N/a
5	Holger Nielsen	"Frøken fjern"	Bo C.K. Møller, Dorte Qvortrup Geisling	—N/a
6	Linda Vilhelmsen	"En sommernat"	Linda D. Wilhelmsen	Advanced
7	Sweet Keld and the Hilda Hearts	"Det vil vi da blæse på"	Lotte Meincke, Keld Heick	Advanced
8	Zindy Laursen and Jan Parber	"Sket igen"	Jan Parber, Jes Kerstein	Advanced
9	Lise-Lotte Norup	"Livet spejler sig"	Henrik Jandorf	—N/a
10	Fenders	"Solens børn"	Palle Andreassen, Susan Magnusson	Advanced

Second Round – 29 February 1992
R/O	Artist	Song	Televote	Place
1	Lotte Nilsson and Kenny Lübcke	"Alt det som ingen ser"	6,438	1
2	Linda Vilhelmsen	"En sommernat"	4,564	4
3	Sweet Keld and the Hilda Hearts	"Det vil vi da blæse på"	2,900	5
4	Zindy Laursen and Jan Parber	"Sket igen"	5,999	2
5	Fenders	"Solens børn"	4,978	3

Detailed Regional Televoting Results – Second Round
R/O	Song	Jutland					Funen	Islands	North Zealand	Capital Region	Total
R/O	Song	North	West	East	Central	South	Funen	Islands	North Zealand	Capital Region	Total
1	"Alt det som ingen ser"	967	302	751	516	296	521	831	1,258	996	6,438
2	"En sommernat"	547	248	771	342	178	401	918	660	499	4,564
3	"Det vil vi da blæse på"	266	95	315	216	93	265	355	536	759	2,900
4	"Sket igen"	567	224	982	697	247	529	573	1,222	958	5,999
5	"Solens børn"	459	318	675	952	1,043	357	422	491	261	4,978

== At Eurovision ==
Nilsson and Lübcke performed 18th on the night of the contest, following Ireland and preceding Italy. "Alt det som ingen ser" received 47 points, placing 12th in a field of 23.

The contest was broadcast on DR TV (with commentary by Jørgen de Mylius) and on radio station DR P3 (with commentary by Jesper Bæhrenz and Andrew Jensen). The contest was watched by a total of 2.2 million viewers in Denmark.

=== Voting ===
Points awarded to Denmark
Score	Country
12 points	
10 points	
8 points	
7 points	Sweden
6 points	Iceland; Israel; Luxembourg; Norway
5 points	Germany
4 points	Spain
3 points	Austria; United Kingdom
2 points	
1 point	Portugal

Points awarded by Denmark
Score	Country
12 points	United Kingdom
10 points	Ireland
8 points	Malta
7 points	Austria
6 points	Norway
5 points	Iceland
4 points	Sweden
3 points	Germany
2 points	Israel
1 point	Spain
