= Vidar Lønn-Arnesen =

Norwegian presenter and musician (1940–2025)

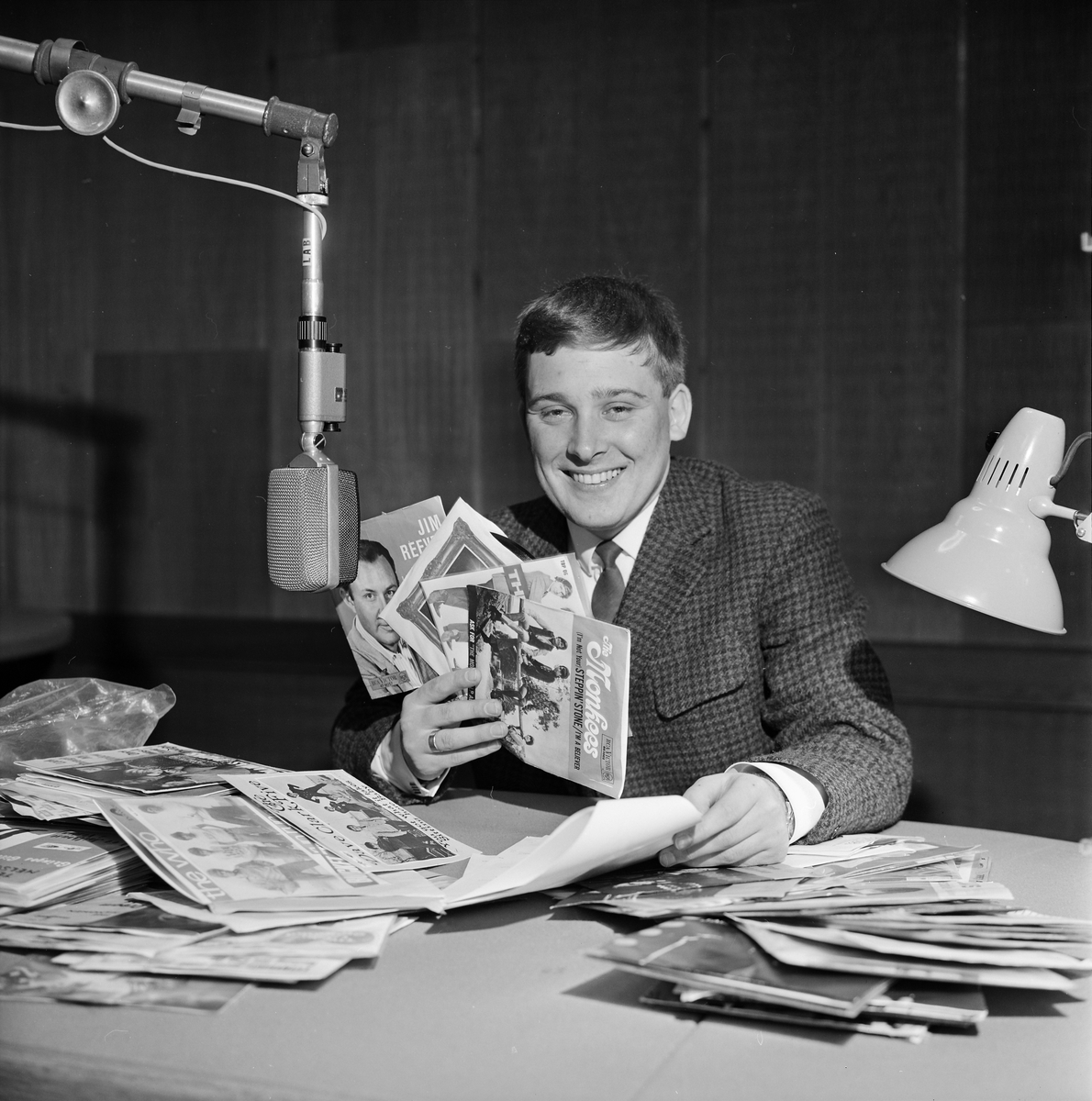
Lønn-Arnesen in 1967

Vidar Lønn-Arnesen (22 June 1940 – 17 October 2025) was a Norwegian singer, radio presenter and television presenter.

== Life and career ==
Lønn-Arnesen was born in Lardal Municipality and grew up in Horten Municipality. He started his career as a local entertainer and pirate radio personality in the 1950s. From 1960 to 1964 he was a member of the pop group Tre Tainers.

He was hired by the Norwegian Broadcasting Corporation in 1962. He presented the radio program Ti i skuddet from 1965 to 1970 and 1981 to 1991, and also Musikktelefonen, Western Saloon, Norsktoppen and Alle tiders blinkskudd. From 1991 to 2001 he presented the television program Da Capo. He also hosted the Melodi Grand Prix in 1972, 1973, 1974 and 1977. Lønn-Arnesen was also member of the Norwegian Order of Freemasons.

In 2010 he was decorated with the King's Medal of Merit in gold. He was married to television producer Tove Lønn-Arnesen and resided at Grav.

Lønn-Arnesen died on 17 October 2025, at the age of 85.

== Discography ==
=== Albums ===
- Vidar synger Prøysen (1974)
- Jo mere vi er sammen (1975)
- Jo mere vi er sammen Vol. 2 (1976)
- Jo mere vi er sammen Vol. 3 (1978)
- Julepresangen (1980)
- Bom falleri (1983)
- Countryfest i kveld (1984)
- Vill vest med Vidar (1988)
- Vidar synger Egner (1994)
- Vidar synger Prøysen 2 (1995)
- Á la da Capo! (1999)

=== Singles ===
- Musikktelefonen (1991)
