= List of radio stations in Malta =

This is a list of radio stations in Malta.

Frequency	Branding	Format	Website
88.7	"Vibe FM"	Rhythmic contemporary	
89.3	"Radju Lauretana"	Generalist	
89.7	"Bay Radio"	Contemporary Hit Radio	
90.6	"Radju Santa Katarina"	Music, Talk Shows, Religious	
90.9	"Radju Katidral"	Religious	
91.7	"Magic Malta"	Pop Music	
92.4	Radju Viżitazzjoni	Religious	
92.7	"ONE Radio"	News, Current Affairs, Political & Music Programming	
93.3	"MICS FM"	Oldies	
93.7	"Radju Malta"	Generalist	
94.5	"Radju BKR"	Generalist	
95.1	"Radju Sokkors"	Generalist	
96.1	"Radju Margerita"	Generalist	
97.8	"RTK103"	Generalist	
98.0	"Radio City 98FM"	Oldies	
98.3	"Radju Bambina"	Generalist	
99.3	"Radju Prekursur"	Generalist	
100.2	"Bay Easy"	Hits from the 80s, 90s, and 2000s	
101.0	NET FM / Radio 101	News, Current Affairs, Political & Music Programming	
101.4	Radju Leħen il-Karmelitani	Music, News, Religion	
101.4	"Radju Għażżiela"	Generalist	
101.8	"Calypso Radio 101.8"	Music	
102.3	"Radju Marija"	Catholic Religious	
103.0	"RTK103"	Generalist	
103.7	"Campus FM"	International Programming	
104.0	"LBV104 - Leħen il-Belt Victoria"	Generalist	
104.6	"Smash Radio"	Pop Music	
105.0	"Radio 105"	Pop Music	
105.2	"Radju Sacro Cuor"	Generalist	
105.9	"Radju Malta 2"	Generalist	
106.3	"RLQ - Radju Leħen il-Qala"	Generalist	
106.9	"Radju Luminaria"	Christian	
185.36 (DAB+)	"RAVE Radio"	Electronic Music	
Web	"AMAM (African Media Association Malta)"	African Music	
