= TVM (Malta) =

Maltese terrestrial television network

TVM (Television Malta)
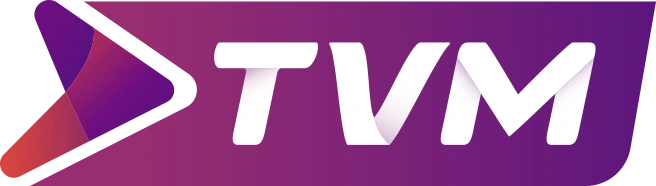
- Current TVM logo (2023)
- Country: Malta
- Headquarters: Gwardamanġa, Pietà, Malta

Programming
- Languages: Maltese (main); English (secondary)
- Picture format: 1080i HDTV

Ownership
- Owner: Public Broadcasting Services (Government of Malta)
- Sister channels: TVM+; TVMSport+; Parliament TV

History
- Launched: 29 September 1962; 64 years ago
- Former names: Malta Television (MTV) (1962–1981)

Links
- Website: tvmnews.mt

Availability

Terrestrial
- Free-to-air: 43 (UHF)
- GO: 101
- Melita: 101

Streaming media
- TVMi: tvmi.mt

Television Malta (Maltese: Televixin Malta; TVM) (formerly known as Malta Television Service; MTV and Xandir Malta) is a terrestrial television network in Malta operated by the Public broadcaster, Public Broadcasting Services. Alongside TVM, PBS operates TVM+, TVMSport+ and Parliament TV.

== History ==
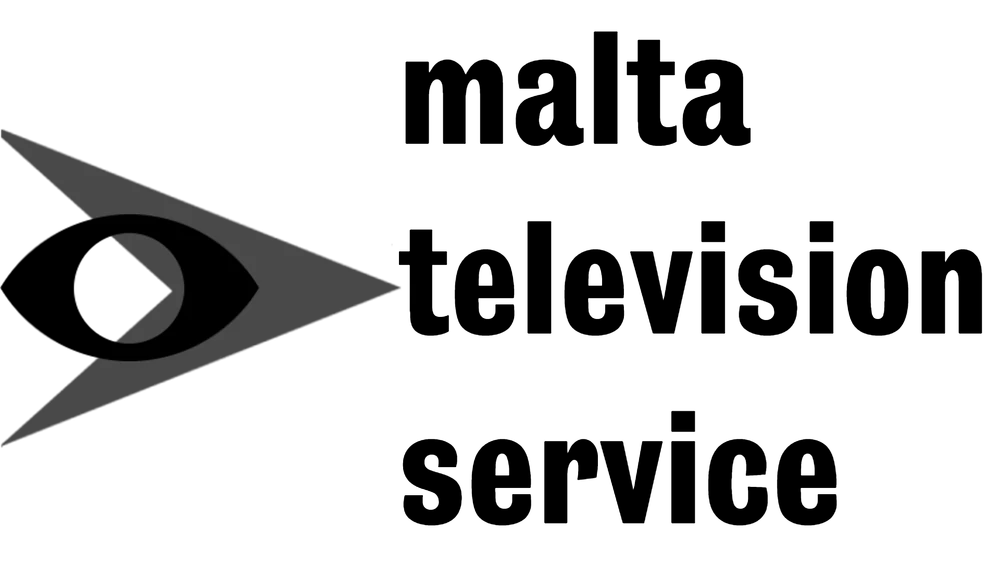
First logo of the MTV

The Malta Television Service (MTV), was launched on 29 September 1962 as the first television service in the country, with technical backing from Rediffusion UK, although television broadcasts from neighbouring Sicily in far-southern Italy could be received in Malta from as early as 1957. In 1975, Xandir Malta (Broadcasting Malta), the precursor to the Public Broadcasting Services was established by parliament.

=== Early days, 1962–1964 ===
Italian radio transmissions, popular since the 1920s, influenced Maltese listeners. To counter this influence, British authorities granted a radio license to Rediffusion, a British broadcast company, in 1935, where it had one channel featuring BBC content and another featuring Maltese content. On the eves of independence, Rediffusion won the contract to broadcast television. The first broadcast on 11 November 1935 coincided with Mussolini's attempt at invading Malta, which failed.

On 29 September 1962, local television in Malta was introduced. The Malta Television Service was launched as a subsidiary of Rediffusion Malta. Programming on the inaugural night included a mix of speeches from Governor Sir Maurice Dorman, Archbishop Mgr Sir Michael Gonzi and Prime Minister George Borg Olivier, a number of imported British productions, some Maltese productions and the Daily Newscast. Broadcasts lasted 4.5 hours daily; sets were expensive and radio was still the most dominant form of entertainment in Malta well into the 70s.

Until 1964, TVM was based at Rediffusion House in Gwardamanġa, after which it was moved to the nearby, purpose-built Television House.

=== Early years of independent Malta ===
In 1964, following Malta's independence, MTV was tasked to provide SOS and police messages as well as public information films produced by government bodies. In 1971, Malta took part in the Eurovision Song Contest for the first time.

=== Sit-in strike and nationalisation, 1975 ===
In 1975, following the breakdown of discussions on the new collective agreement a sit-in strike and a lockout of management was held by Rediffusion Malta employees. On 14 February 1975, the Action Committee formed to organise the sit-in announced it to the workers. At 7:38am, broadcasting was stopped and doors were closed to the management and non-Union workers. The workers, during the sit-in also established an Emergency Service, which broadcast a short news bulletin. The Rediffusion Group of Companies demanded police intervention to stop the "illegal" occupation and broadcasting. They also attempted to lease a hotel room as a temporary office but were thwarted by the GWU threatening the hotel with a strike. On 19 February 1975, regular broadcasting was resumed, however under the direction of Union officials and not Rediffusion/MTV management.

Prime Minister Dom Mintoff expressed sympathy for the workers and stated the government's support for terminal benefits. He indicated the government would intervene if the situation became critical but downplayed the urgency compared to essential services. The Rediffusion Group started legal proceedings against union officials and striking workers for violating property rights and unauthorized broadcasting. The GWU countered by arguing their actions were protected under industrial dispute regulations. This led to the MBA being silent, and 2 of its members representing the Partit Nazzjonalista publicly criticizing the Authority.

This led to the TV service being nationalised. Xandir Malta, the precursor to PBS was established as part of Telemalta, a government owned company on 31 June 1975. The outside broadcast van was operative in February 1976, providing access to a wide array of live events. A second channel (Tivumalta) also opened from the existing facilities.

=== Colour television, 1981 ===
Colour TV was introduced in Malta on 8 July 1981. This was following in the footsteps of RAI, who was already transmitting TV in colour back in the 1970s. This switch led to the slow switchover of Maltese households from owning Black and White TVs to Colour TVs. There were some broadcasting hiccups, with some presenters forgetting they were being broadcasting in colour and making some hilarious mistakes. In the early days of colour, Television Malta broadcast for five and a half hours a day. On Saturdays, it provided an additional five hours of programming during the daytime for nine months; during the summer months, said daytime schedule aired on Sundays. Local and foreign programmes were almost equally divided, with Xandir Malta producing 51% of its output, while the remaining 49% was foreign, especially from the USA, the UK and the rest of Europe.

=== Later history ===
Even in the 1980s, live music was still a relative rarity on local television, with strong emphasis on classical music. Live performance of rock bands were virtually non-existent; bands had to air pre-recorded performances on programmes such as TeleDisco, Sibtijiet Flimkien, Bonġu Malta and Arzella. By the late 80s, Mill-Garaxx premiered, providing artists the chance to perform live.

TVM produced two editions of Jeux sans frontières in the two years it participated, in 1994 and 1995. The edition it produced in 1994 was about the history of the island of Malta, in the National Pool Complex of Tal-Qroqq, while that of 1995 was about the Maltese calendar, in Fort Manoel.

TVM topped an audience survey conducted by the Broadcasting Authority in the second quarter of 2005, with 20,6% of respondents making it their favourite channel, ahead of Labour-owned Super One and Mediaset channels Canale 5 and Italia 1.

In April 2007, TVM was fined for mentioning the establishment where an edition of its 118 programme broadcast in February that year was filmed. TVM's analogue signal was switched off on 1 November 2011, after 49 years on air; the switch-off was originally scheduled for 31 December 2010, later 1 June 2011. Both TVM and Education 22 were given top priority on the digital platform.

In October 2022, the channel started using virtual sets for some of its key programmes, drawing criticism from the picture quality and comparing it to independent channel Smash TV, which runs on a smaller budget.

== Rebrands ==
=== Major rebrand (2007) ===
TVM introduced a new identity on 8 April 2007, replacing the old logo in use since 1998. The new look stood out TVM's position within PBS. A new news studio was also introduced. The new logo, consisting of two boxes, one white and one red, in allusion to the flag of Malta, cost Lm10,000. It was criticised by Labour MP Helena Dalli for being a waste of money.

The rebrand was accompanied by roadside billboards which were criticised for having incorrect Maltese spelling.

=== Major anniversary rebrand (2011) ===
Former TVM logo (2011–2021)

In October 2011, PBS announced a full overhaul of the TVM brand, to mark 50 years since the establishment of the Malta Television Service in 2012. The new branding pays homage to previous TVM identities, and makes use of the Maltese cross,. The Maltese Cross element featured heavily in the "L-Aħbarijiet tat-8" (8pm News) title sequence, and various idents produced by TVM. This rebrand was extended to all TVM related services, including the tvm.com.mt website and parent company's PBS branding.

This rebrand was part of a larger step forward towards modernising the services offered by TVM. This included switching to a widescreen format (16:9) and slowly starting the transition towards broadcasting in HD.

=== 60th anniversary rebrand (2021) ===
Former TVM logo (2021–2023) which was heavily criticised when TVM was rebranded in 2021

In 2021, PBS announced another rebrand. The rebrand was met with criticism, since it was held in the form of a competition, and the competitors whose design wasn't selected didn't even get acknowledgment for participating. The new logos being rolled out for PBS, TVM and TVMNews+ were especially met with fierce criticism, after some competitors took to Facebook to share their designs. This was part of a larger overhaul of TVM's presence on the island, splitting entertainment and news in two separate channels, a move which was seen by the Nationalist Party (opposition) as a blatant attempt to relegate news and current affairs programmes to a secondary channel with low viewership ratings, especially since this happened after popular discussion programmes such as Xarabank and Dissett were axed from the schedule previously.

- TVM (flagship channel) – switched its focus from general programming to focusing exclusively on drama and family entertainment.
- TVMNews+ (secondary channel) – switched its focus from a secondary TV station to one focusing exclusively on news and current affairs programmes.
- tvmnews.mt (news website) – had its URL switched from tvm.com.mt to tvmi.mt

=== 2nd 2020's rebrand (2023) ===
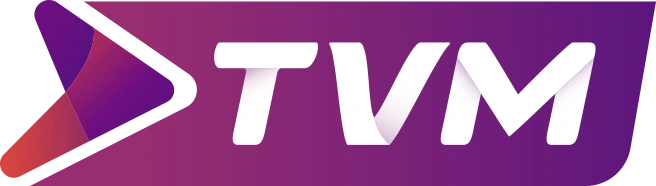
Current TVM logo which was subtly changed in 2023

After the criticism faced in the previous rebrand, TVM and the other PBS-made stations rebranded their identity in early October 2023, and launched the new TV station TVMSport+. In late 2024, they once again changed the focus of their TV channels. As of February 2025, the rebrand has not been fully executed since some services such as tvmnews.mt website and the tvmi.mt web streaming service are still using the 2021 design language.

- TVM (flagship channel) – switched its focus from drama and family entertainment to general programming.
- TVM+ (secondary channel) – switched its focus from news and current affairs to a secondary TV station.
- TVMSport+ (sport channel) – retained its focus on sports.

== Sister channels and services ==
=== TVM+ ===
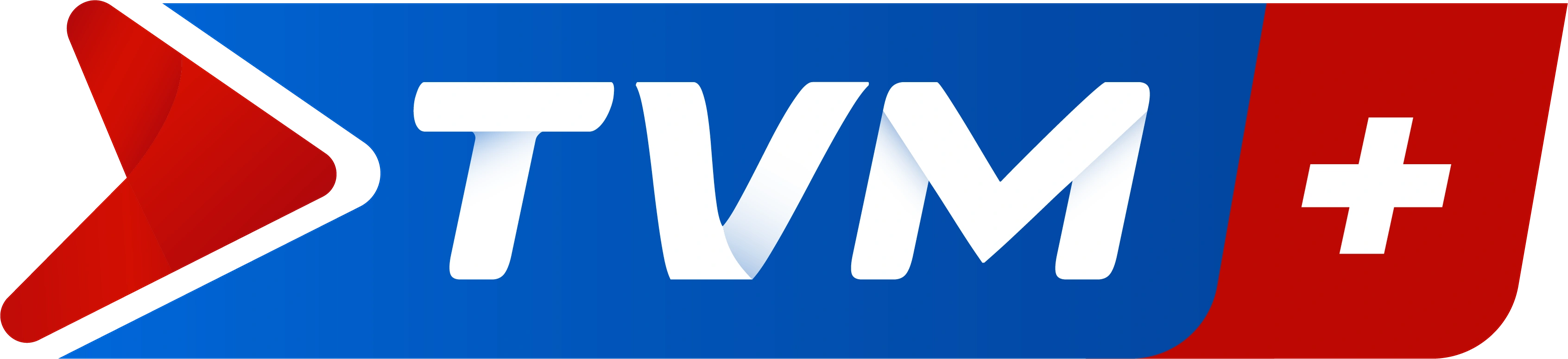
Current TVM+ logo (introduced in 2024)

In March 2012, PBS started trial transmissions on the new sister channel TVM2, which replaced Education 22 (E22). The broadcast time started at 6am and finished at around 11:30pm. TVM2 carried additional programmes, imported movies/programmes and other media which were not broadcast on the flagship TVM channel.

Former TVMNews+ logo (2021–2023) which was met with criticism from the general public

In 2021, TVM2 changed its identity to TVMNews+, the latter becoming transformed from a secondary channel to the channel for news and current affairs programmes. Due to this, It was met with criticism especially from the opposition since rather than having rolling news coverage, the station moved broadcasts of current affairs programmes from the main channel to a secondary channel. This was confirmed as surveys from the Broadcasting Authority (BA) showed that the channel had less than 3% viewership.

In 2024, the latter was rebranded once again to TVM+, and switched its focus back to secondary programming, showing programmes and repeats not shown on the main TVM channel.

=== TVMSport+ ===
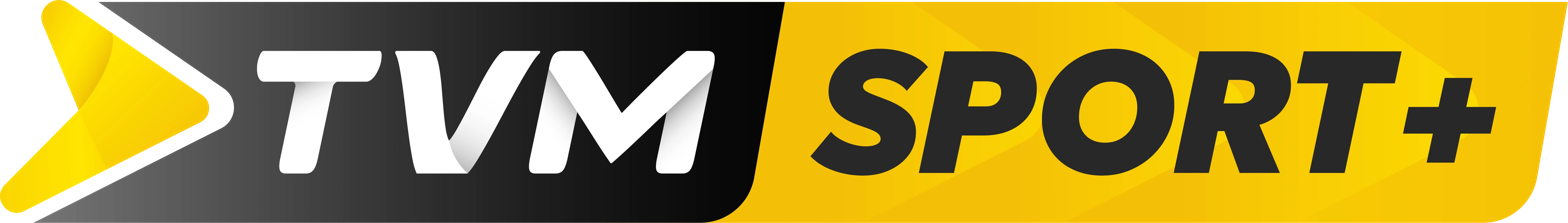
Current TVMSport+ logo (introduced in 2024)

TVMSport+ was launched on 29 September 2022 as part of celebrations for 60 years of TVM. Before the TVMSport+ channel was created, sport programmes used to be scattered across TVM and TVM2.

During some flagship sporting events, TVM2 used to be rebranded to TVM Sports.

=== Parliament TV ===
Current Parliament TV logo

Parliament TV is a joint venture between PBS and the Parliament of Malta, which established in 2015 following the relocation of Parliament to the new parliament building in Valletta.

=== TVM HD (and TVM2 HD) ===
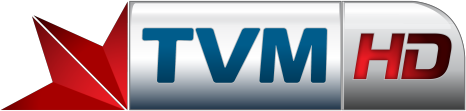
Last logo of TVM HD (2012-unknown)

On 8 March 2012, PBS also started trials of TVM HD, the first HD channel from Malta.

The channel was available to all those who had Melita and could be found on channel 110. GO, Melita's main rival in the cable television industry in Malta included the service later in their schedule and also exclusively TVM2 HD. These channels were eventually retired once all TVM programmes were being broadcast in HD.

=== TVMi ===
Current logo of TVMi (introduced in 2022)

TVMi is TVM's free streaming service. It offers livestreams of the TV Channels and Radio Channels that are operated by PBS (except Parliament TV). On demand recordings of most past programmes are also available. The service also includes the schedule for the TVM branded channels. Whilst TVMi primarily hosts live video streams of TVM, TVM+ and TVMSports+, there are occasions in which extra channels are added. Big Brother Malta hosts a 24/7 live video streams on TVMi, and a backstage stream was opened up temporarily during the 2025 Malta Eurovision Song Contest.

In 2022, TVMi was rebranded to become a more modern streaming service, in line with the 2021 rebrand. It was not updated in 2023 to match the newly rebranded 2023 design language and is still used as of 2026.

== Programming ==
TVM broadcasts a mix of news, sport, entertainment, magazine programming and children's programmes. It is funded through a government grant and commercial advertising. PBS publishes details of the types of programmes it wishes to broadcast on TVM, and production companies provide PBS with a detailed report of their proposal for the programme, this is most commonly known as a Programmes Statement of Intent or PSI.

Most programmes are broadcast in Maltese, however both Maltese and English are official languages of Malta. The English language feed of Euronews is also broadcast daily, mainly through TVM+.

A new programme schedule was announced, including an increased number of news bulletins and a new current affairs-led breakfast show. For several years including the 2015/2016 period TVM had the highest number of viewers compared to the rest of Maltese television stations put together. Some of the current hits are Xarabank, Disset, Strada Stretta, Skjetti and news broadcasting. Statistics show that more than a quarter of the population of Malta watch these on a regular basis.

=== News ===
News programming on TVM is the only major TV news not produced by a political party's media apparatus in Malta. The two other major Maltese networks (One and NET Television) are owned by the Labour and Nationalist parties respectively.

TVM airs TVAM, a breakfast television program focused on news and current affairs, weekday mornings from 06:30 to 09:00.

TVM's main newscast L-Aħbarijiet ("News"), commonly referred to as L-Aħbarijiet tat-tmienja ("News at 8") is aired daily from 20:00 to 20:50, along with short news updates titled throughout the day. When important events happened, such as the death of Queen Elizabeth II and Pope Benedict XVI, TVM broadcast lengthened editions of their regular News Bulletins. When Breaking News (Aħbar Straordinarja) breaks out, TVM occasionally interrupts regular programming to broadcast a special news report.

Since 2012, a nightly newscast in Maltese Sign Language has aired on sister network TVM+ at 18:00.

TVM previously carried bulletins in English from Euronews and Britain's ITN. TVM+ still regularly broadcasts streams from Euronews to fill gaps in their programming schedule.
