= Public Broadcasting Services =

Public broadcaster of Malta

Coordinates: 35°53′31″N 14°29′32″E

Public Broadcasting Services Limited (PBS Malta Ltd.)
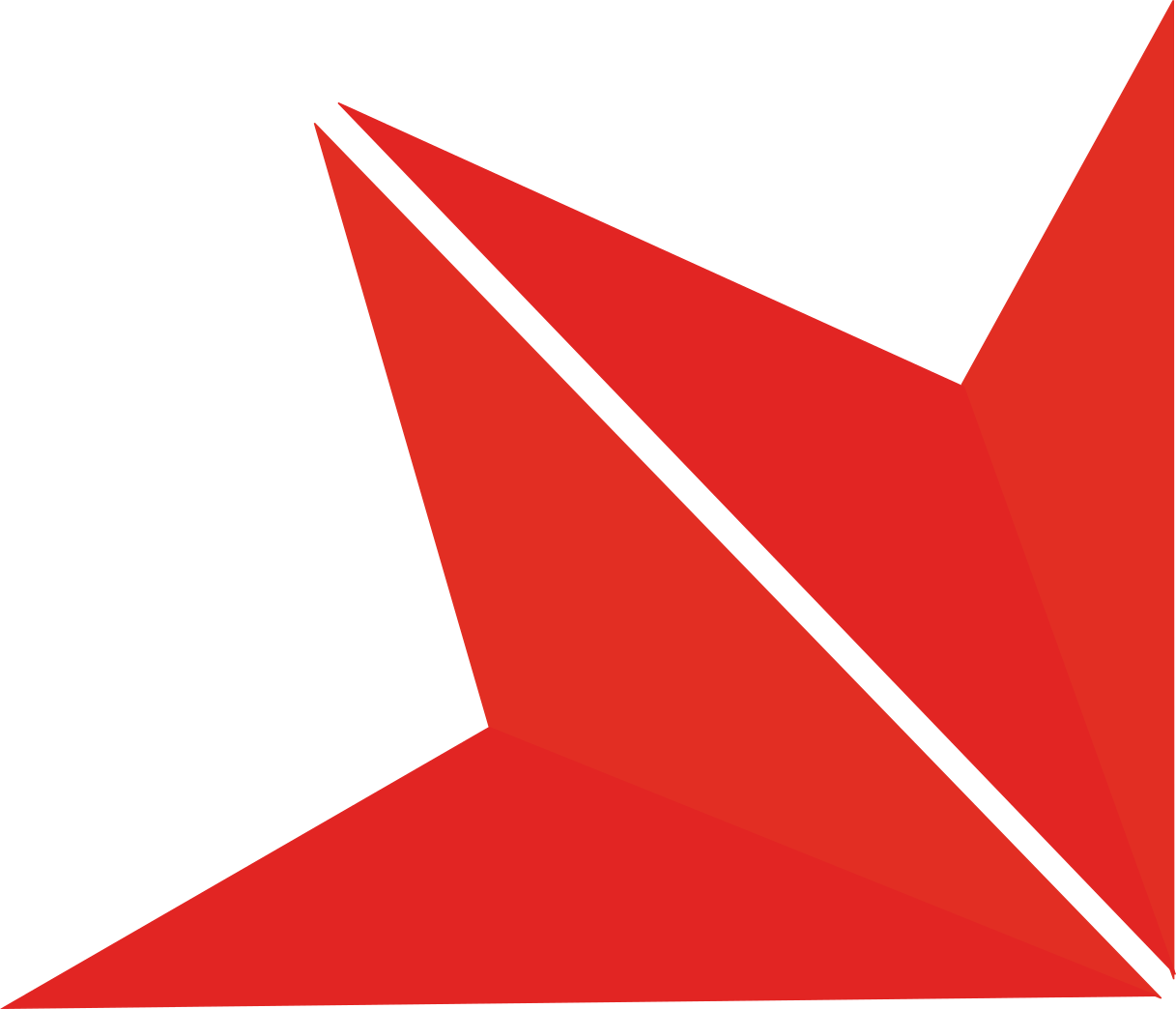
- PBS logo, used from 2023 and onwards

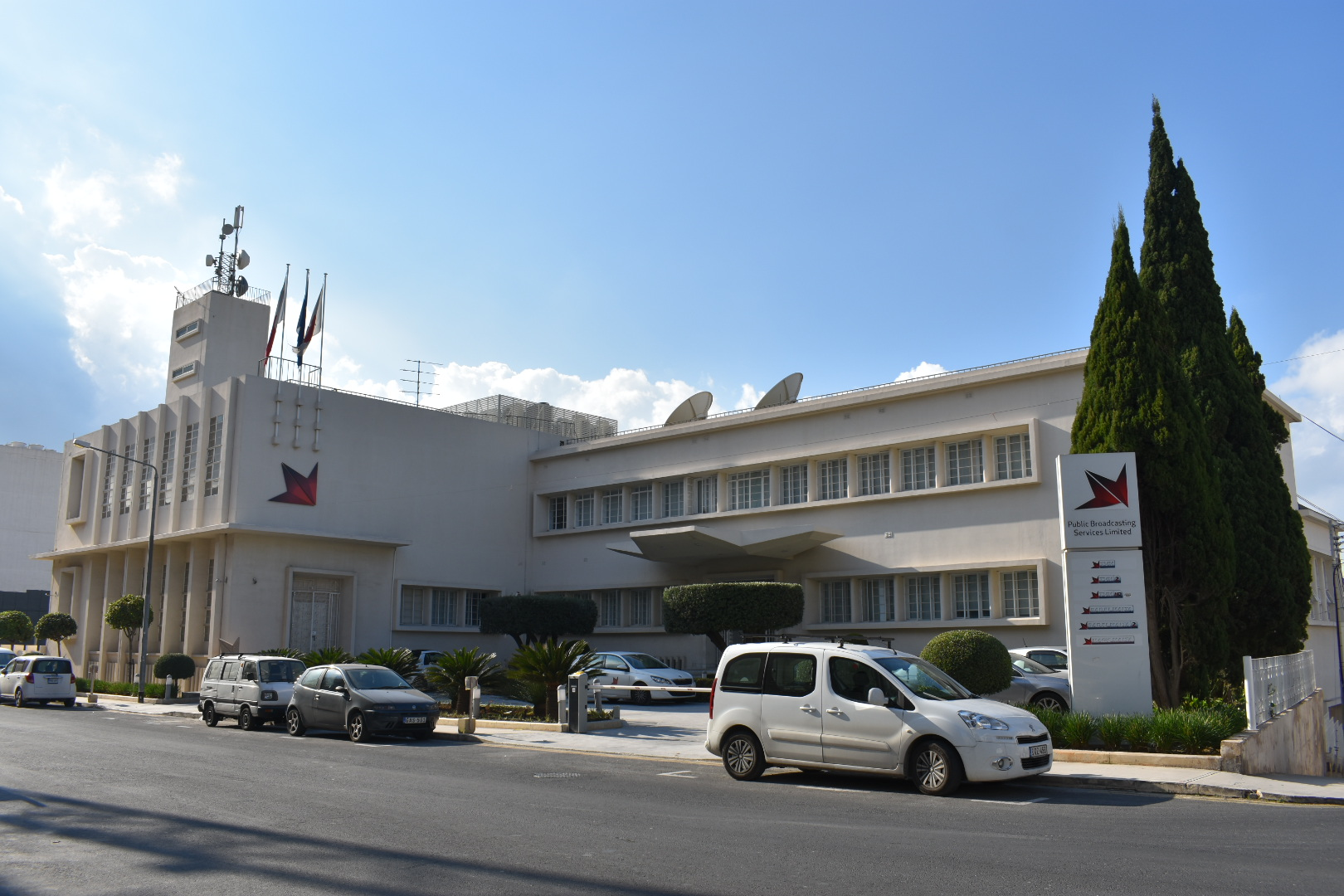
- PBS Creativity Hub, formerly known as Rediffusion House, Gwardamanġa
- Formerly: Xandir Malta
- Industry: Public broadcasting
- Predecessor: Rediffusion Malta
- Founded: 11 November 1975; 50 years ago
- Headquarters: 75, St. Luke's Road, Gwardamanġa, Malta
- Area served: Malta
- Owner: Government of Malta
- Divisions: TVM; TVM+; TVMSport+; Radju Malta; Radju Malta 2; Magic Malta
- Website: www.pbs.com.mt

Public Broadcasting Services Limited (PBS; Maltese: Servizzi ta' Xandir Pubbliku) is the public broadcaster of Malta. PBS is funded by government grants and the sale of commercial airtime. Its TVM channel is Malta's most watched television channel, and its radio station Magic Malta enjoys huge popularity among local and foreign listeners.

Each year on 13 December, PBS hosts an open day, where the public takes a visit in the building and have a look at the sets of the channels and radios.

== History ==
Former PBS logo, used before 2012

PBS was founded on 11 November 1975 as Xandir Malta and became joint member of the European Broadcasting Union (EBU) together with the Maltese Broadcasting Authority (MBA). The latter was previously admitted as a full, active member, as Malta Television Service Ltd already has been, in 1970. Since 2003, PBS is the sole Maltese member of EBU.

Prior to Xandir Malta, Rediffusion broadcast television programmes in Malta under the name The Malta Television Service Ltd. The service was run by Rediffusion, a London-based independent broadcaster. Transmissions in Malta started from Hamrun on 11 November 1935 under the name of "Broadcast Relay Service Malta Ltd." Charles Whotcroft and George Powler were the first manager and chief engineer respectively. On 29 September 1962 Rediffusion (Malta) Ltd. inaugurated a television service covering the Maltese islands.

On 14 February 1975 the employees of the Rediffusion (Malta) Ltd staged a sit-in strike at the company's premises in Malta and even started to run the company. On 30 July 1975 an agreement was reached between Rediffusion Group of Companies and the Labour government of Malta for the transfer of all Rediffusion's assets in Malta to the Maltese government.

Following the transition to digital television using the DVB-T standard in October 2011, all licensed terrestrial channels in Malta are distributed through a network of transmitters operated by PBS. These transmitters are located in Delimara, Nadur, Mellieħa, Mtarfa, Naxxar and Portomaso.

PBS is managed by a board of directors. The current non-executive chairperson is Anna Bonett. Keith Chetcuti is the chief executive officer and Engelbert Grech is the chairperson of the PBS Editorial Board.

In 2021, PBS announced that their TV channels would change their channel logo branding and a channel name change as well with TVM2 changing its name to TVMNews+ (now known as TVM+), these changes were met with criticism and in 2023, PBS quietly updated its logo branding on their TV and radio services.

== Services ==
=== Radio ===
PBS' radio services consist of the Radju Malta, Radju Malta 2 and Magic Malta radio stations.

For a short period between 1975 and 1976 it also had an Italian-language station, called Radio Malta Tre; the news was read by Anna Bonanno.

=== Television ===
PBS' television services consist of the TVM, TVM+ and TVMSport+ television channels. It also operates the Parliament TV service under an agreement with the Parliament of Malta.
