= Radio Malta =

Maltese radio station

Radio Malta (Radju Malta)
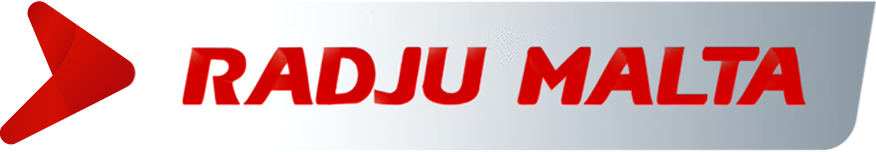
- Malta
- Frequencies: 999 kHz (AM); 93.7 MHz (FM); 181,936 MHz (DAB+)

Programming
- Language: Maltese

Ownership
- Owner: Public Broadcasting Services (Government of Malta)
- Sister stations: Radju Malta 2, Magic Malta

History
- First air date: 11 November 1935; 90 years ago (Cable radio); 8 January 1973; 53 years ago (Wireless Broadcast)

Technical information
- Transmitter coordinates: 35°53′31″N 14°29′32″E

Links
- Website: Radju Malta

Radio Malta (Maltese: Radju Malta) is the main radio service of Public Broadcasting Services, the public broadcaster of Malta.

== Founding ==
The origins of Radio Malta go back to 1935. For many years, transmissions were effected on a cable-radio system which started way back on 11 November 1935 by a British company called Rediffusion. This Rediffusion Cable Radio Service was officially launched on 11 November 1935. Its launch came at a time when Benito Mussolini tried to invade Malta, which failed. On 29 September 1962, the same company, officially opened the Malta Television Service, then known as MTV, now Television Malta (TVM). During the late sixties Rediffusion Malta effected several test transmissions with the aim to set up a radio station. But the radio station never materialised, possibly due to conflict of interest with the cable radio system which the same company was utilising.

Regular Wireless radio transmissions in Maltese started on 8 January 1973 by the Malta Broadcasting Authority on 999 kHz Medium Wave (AM). It was called "Radju ta' Malta". This frequency is still in use by Radio Malta.

Norman Hamilton, then Rediffusion's top D.J., left the company and decided to join Radio Malta from its first day of transmission. Norman is no longer involved in radio. Another popular D.J. is Brian Micallef who started presenting Rock Programs during the Rediffusion era and is still very active on Radio Malta. Mario Laus was also one of Radio Malta's first D.J.s and today he is still one of its most popular D.J.s.

In 1975, when Xandir Malta was set up, the Cable Radio system, now no longer belonging to Rediffusion, and Radio Malta, became one entity with a separate identity.

Radio Malta started transmitting on FM 93.7 MHz when the British Forces Broadcasting Services (BFBS Malta) closed down on 31 March 1979 with the departure of British Services from the Maltese Islands.

== Development ==
Former logo (2001–2007)

Former logo (2007–2011)

The cable radio system was officially closed down on 31 January 1989 and its programmes continued on as a wireless service on MW 999 kHz. Consequently, many broadcasters were now working solely for Radio Malta. Among these, Charles Arrigo, trained by the BBC.,Charles Abela Mizzi. Others still working with Radio Malta, are George Peresso and Peter Paul Ciantar.

On the 27 September 1991, Public Broadcasting Services took over the role and responsibility of Xandir Malta. The year 1991 ushered in an era of broadcast pluralism in Malta. This phenomenon brought to Radio Malta many a new talent. However, with pluralism, Malta witnessed greater staff mobility within local radio stations which started to mushroom on the Maltese Islands. Joe Dimech, Lilian Maistre, Ray Calleja, Tony Micallef, Albert Storace, Brian Micallef, Eddie Darmanin, are just some of its longest serving broadcasters. Today many new voices are part of Radio Malta's success. Other veterans have also returned to the fold.

== Content ==
Radio Malta transmits cultural and current affairs programmes putting a strong focus on news. Phone-Ins feature on some of its programmes. Classical music and classic hits form an integral part of its daily 24x7 schedule.

All programmes on Radio Malta are transmitted in the Maltese language. Its stereophonic transmissions are also accessible in Malta and Sicily on DAB+ block 6A.

In a survey conducted by the Malta Broadcasting Authority published in September 2019, Radio Malta was classified as the third most "listened to" radio station in Malta and Gozo. In the "Daytime Call-in/Request Shows" category, Lilian Maistre's show came first with regards to "Radio Programmes which listeners normally follow".

In the Audience Survey December 2020 conducted by the Malta Broadcasting Authority published in January 2021, 96% (763 respondents) of all radio listeners use the radio set for listening to radio programmes. The radio set is the most used radio reception service for listening to radio, with almost all radio listeners using this as a radio reception service. 5% (36 respondents) of all radio listeners make use of DAB+.

The current Station Manager of Radju Malta, Radju Malta 2 & Magic is Mr. Carlo Borg Bonaci.
