= Magic 91 =

Magic 91 may refer to:

- Magic 91FM, former radio station in Auckland, New Zealand
- Magic 91, radio station in San Diego, California, U.S., now known as KECR

== See also ==
- Magic 91.7, radio station in Malta
- Magic 91.9, radio station in Clarksville, Tennessee, U.S.
