= Parliament TV =

Parliament TV may refer to the following legislature broadcasters:

- Parliament TV (Malta)
- Parliament TV (New Zealand), one of the Legislature broadcasters in New Zealand
