= Bay Radio (Malta) =

- Bay Radio logo

St. Julian's; Malta
- Broadcast area: Malta
- Frequency: 89.7 MHz

Programming
- Languages: Maltese, English

Ownership
- Owner: Eden Leisure Group
- Sister stations: Bay Easy, Bay Retro, Bay Pride

History
- Founded: 1991

Technical information
- Licensing authority: Malta Broadcasting Authority

Links
- Website: https://bay.com.mt/

Bay Radio, also known as 89.7 Bay, is a radio station located in Malta. Bay Radio is owned by the Eden Leisure Group and was founded in 1991.

== Radio broadcast ==
Bay Radio is based in St Julian's but is licensed to broadcast nationwide on 89.7FM. The station is also available through online stream and DAB+ digital radio. Similarly, other Bay stations Bay Easy, Bay Retro, and Bay Pride all broadcast online and Bay Easy can be found on DAB+ digital radio.

Bay Radio focuses on pop music, particularly current hits. Bay Easy specializes in easy listening music while Bay Retro focuses on classic songs.

Bay Pride was launched in September 2022 in collaboration with Allied Rainbow Communities (ARC) Malta. The launch date matched the start of the 2022 Malta Pride Week, during which 89.7 Bay was a sponsor of the Pride March. Bay Pride is described as Malta’s first LGBTI+ music station.

Bay Radio broadcasts 24 hours a day, with several programme names making reference to the time of day such as Bay Breakfast with Daniel & Ylenia and Evenings with Jake. In 2024, Daniel & Yleina retired, thus being replaced by 2025 Muzika Muzika winner Jamie Cardona & new radio host Taryn.

== Popularity ==
Bay Radio is currently the most popular radio station in Malta, reaching 17.7% of listeners in November 2021, as surveyed by the Malta Broadcasting Authority. As of this survey, Bay Radio has been the most popular radio station in the country for 15 consecutive years.

== Bay TV ==
In May 2021, the Bay TV project was launched. This involves a variety of TV shows broadcast online on the 89.7 Bay Facebook page, with plans to launch a Bay TV YouTube channel.

== Bay Music Awards ==
Bay Radio also organizes the Bay Music Awards. Award categories include Best Group, Best Newcomer, Best Male, Best Female, Best Dance, Best Music Video, Best Hip Hop/RNB and Best Song. Notable local artists who won awards at these events include Red Electric, Ira Losco, Michela Pace, Emma Muscat, The Travellers, and Destiny.

== See also ==
- List of radio stations in Malta
- Lists of mass media in Malta
