= Strada Stretta =

- Strada Stretta logo
- Genre: TV Drama; Romance; History
- Created by: Audrey Dalli Brincat
- Directed by: Justin Farrugia; Steven Dalli; Vanessa Vella
- Country of origin: Malta
- Original language: Maltese
- No. of seasons: 2
- No. of episodes: 48

Original release
- Release: September 28, 2015

Strada Stretta was a Maltese television series that aired on Television Malta between 2015 and 2017. The first episode was released on September 28, 2015 and from the start it generated a nostalgic feeling among the Maltese.

As the name implies the setting of the series took place in Strada Stretta, a historic street in Valletta, the capital of Malta. The series takes the viewers to the social and historical realities of 1957, with a plot based on the incidents recorded on a diary that was found in 2015 during refurbishing works on a pub in the eponymous street. The actual setting is based on history books, while the story of this series is based on contextual creativity.

Statistics show that approximately 112,000 Maltese people watched the series, which is approximately a quarter of the entire population of Malta.

== Plot ==
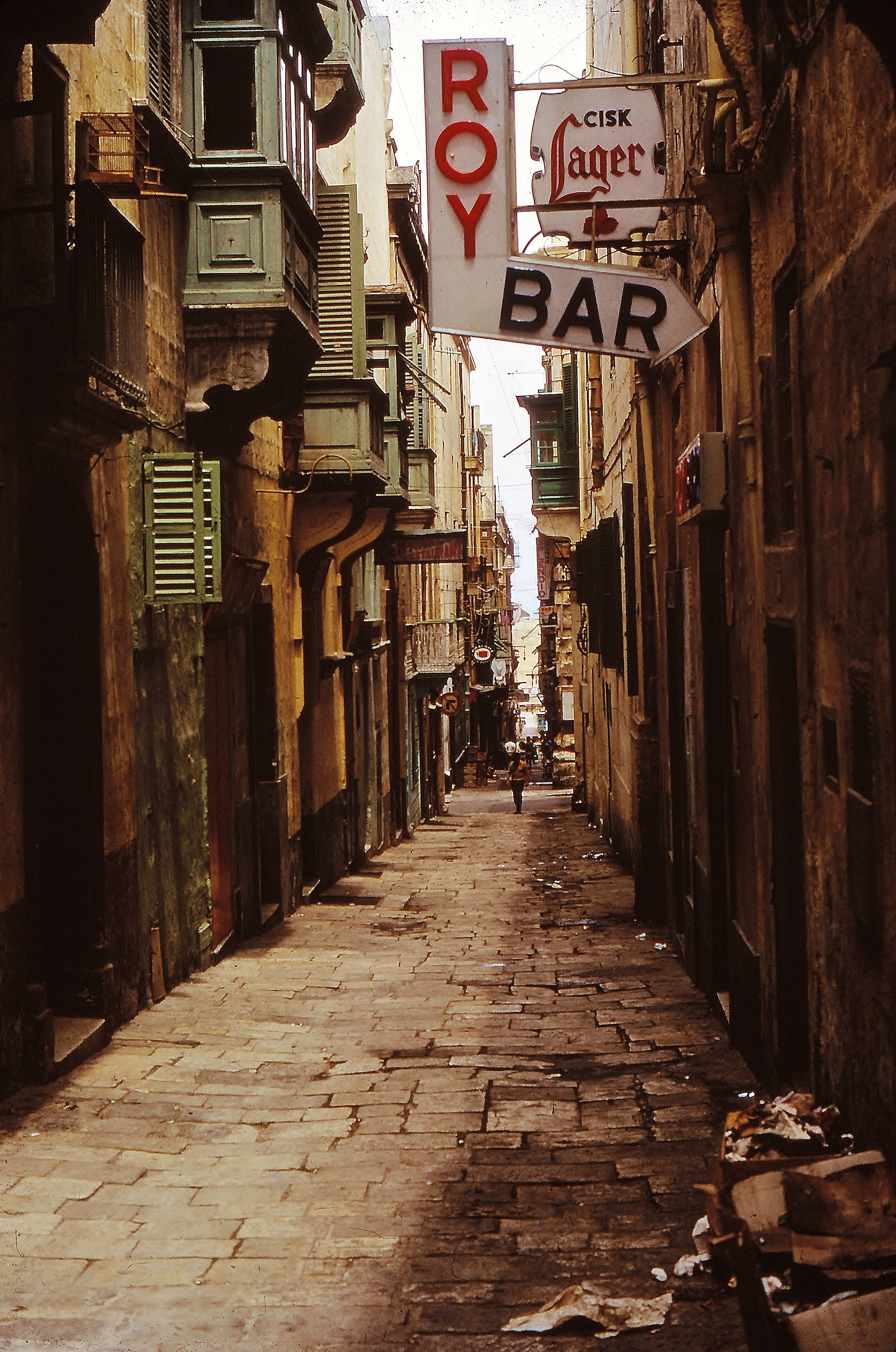
The series is set in Strada Stretta, which was Valletta's red light district

Sylvana a young business woman in 2015 is refurbishing an old bar in Strada Stretta (English: Strait Street, Maltese: Triq id-Dejqa), a street in Valletta which was formerly infamous for being the city's red light district. During the renovations, a personal diary that belonged to a woman (Lydia) in 1957, is found. Lydia's diary transports the series' viewers back to 1957 when she takes the decision to leave her gilded cage and controlling mother in search of a better life with her lover, leaving a life of luxury behind her for the freedom she yearns for.

However, when she finds herself stranded and abandoned in Valletta she befriends Lilly, a bubbly young barmaid who works and lives in the street, who hosts her in return of giving her reading and writing lessons. Strait Street is shown in its former glory when prostitution and murder were commonly associated with the street making it infamous with conservative values at the time. We meet many other personalities, real or fictitious who take us back to this cultural and musical mecca.

The series is mainly set in Strada Stretta and Casa Rocca Piccola in Valletta, and other locations in Malta, such as Villa Blye in Paola.

== Cast ==
- Taryn Mamo Cefai as Lydia
- Ben Camille as Mario
- Jane Marshall as Marie
- Daniel Azzopardi as Guido
- Deandra Agius as Lilly
- Doriana Portelli as Angela
- John Grech as Oscar
- Pauline Fenech as Polly
- Frank Vella as Reno
- Stephanie Agius as Stella
- Andrei Grech as Alvio
- Louise Doneo as Lucia
- John Peel as Wigi
- Naomi Said as Victoria
- Rene Pace as Guzeppi
- Rachel Lynn as Carmen
- Aiken Buhagiar as Victor
- Lawrence Buontempo as Johnny
- Loriannd D'Ugo as Violet
- Jerry Mallia as Gian Marie
- Josef Mizzi as Carmelo
- Neville Refalo as Twanny
- Simon Tabone as Gianni
- Laura Vella as Sylvana
- Shelley Spiteri as Julia
- Steven Dalli as Nenu Zaghzugh
- Carmelo Gauci as Nenu Anzjan
- Frederick Testa as Arturo
- Joseph Farrugia as Dun Rafel
