= Rediffusion House =

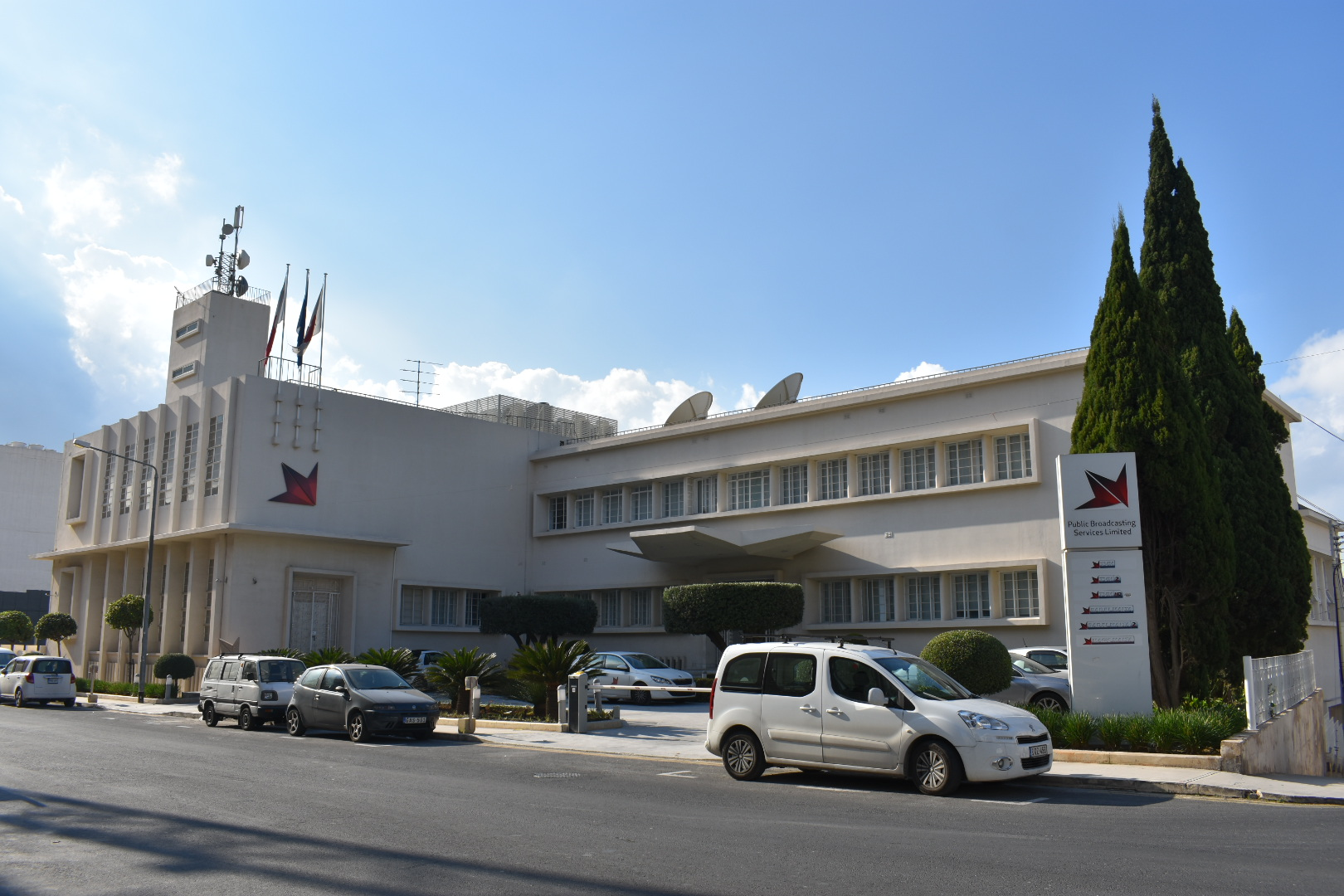
- View of the building in 2017
- Alternative names: Broadcasting House; PBS Creativity Hub

General information
- Status: Intact
- Type: Commercial building
- Architectural style: Modernist
- Location: 75, St. Luke's Road, Gwardamanġa, Pietà, Malta
- Coordinates: 35.8922°N 14.4926°E
- Inaugurated: 23 January 1958
- Renovated: February–December 2012
- Cost: £150,000
- Renovation cost: €3.1 million
- Client: Rediffusion (Malta) Ltd
- Owner: Public Broadcasting Services

Design and construction
- Architect: Carmelo Falzon

Rediffusion House is a Modernist building located in Gwardamanġa, limits of Pietà, Malta. Designed by the architect Carmelo Falzon, the building was completed in 1958 for Rediffusion (Malta) Ltd. It briefly housed Television Malta in the 1960s before a purpose-built Television House was constructed in 1964. The building continued to house Rediffusion until 1975, when the company's operations were taken over by Xandir Malta.

The building remained in use, becoming known as Broadcasting House, and it has housed the Public Broadcasting Services (PBS) since that company took over from Xandir Malta in 1991. Between 2006 and 2008, plans were made to demolish the building and replace it with a new headquarters for PBS, but these were not carried out due to the building's significance in both Malta's architecture and broadcasting history. The building was renovated in 2012, and at this point it was renamed the PBS Creativity Hub.

== History ==
Broadcast Relay Service (Malta) Ltd began broadcasting in Malta in 1935, and the company changed its name to Rediffusion (Malta) Ltd in 1955. Rediffusion House was built in the 1950s to house the company's headquarters and studios. Prior to construction of Rediffusion House, the company was based in Valletta.

The Rediffusion company acquired the plot of land in Gwardamanġa from the Ursuline Sisters on 28 December 1954, for a perpetual annual rent of £206 for 100 years. The agreement stated that the place should not be used for any immoral activities. The building was designed by the architect Carmelo Falzon, and the project cost around £150,000. The first broadcast from the new building occurred on 30 December 1957, and it was inaugurated by Governor Sir Robert Laycock on 23 January 1958.

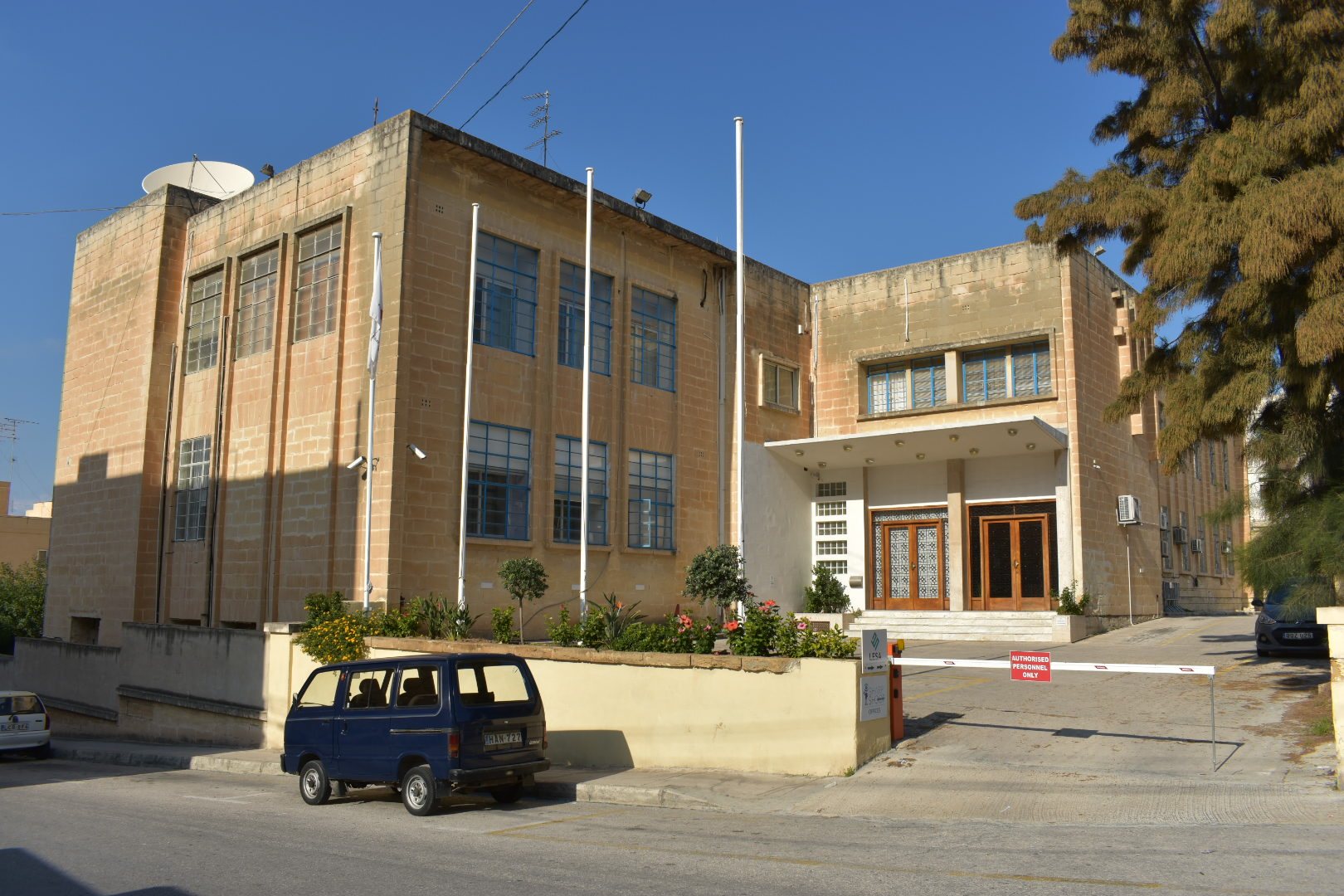
Television House, which is located close to Rediffusion House

The Maltese Broadcasting Authority (MBA), later transferred to the Public Broadcasting Services (PBS), was founded in 1961 to regulate both the Rediffusion and television, then being only the Rediffusion (Malta) Limited and The Malta Television Service Limited. When Television Malta was introduced in 1962, transmissions were made from Rediffusion House until a new building known as Television House was constructed nearby. Television House was completed on 6 February 1964.

Rediffusion (Malta) Ltd was dissolved in 1975, and its operations were taken over by Xandir Malta, the broadcasting division of TeleMalta Corporation. Public Broadcasting Services Ltd (PBS) was established in 1991 to take over Xandir Malta, and continues to operate today. The building remained in use throughout these developments, and Rediffusion House (along with Television House) was scheduled as a Grade 2 building by MEPA in 2001.

By 2006, both Rediffusion House and Television House were in a relatively run down condition, and they were regarded as obsolete and insufficient for the needs of PBS, so plans were made to demolish both buildings. A new PBS headquarters along with apartments, penthouses and garages were to be built on the site of Rediffusion House, while the site of Television House would be developed with apartments and penthouses. The sites for the apartments were to be sold to a third party developer, with the money from the sale being used to construct the new headquarters. The required applications were submitted to MEPA in 2007.

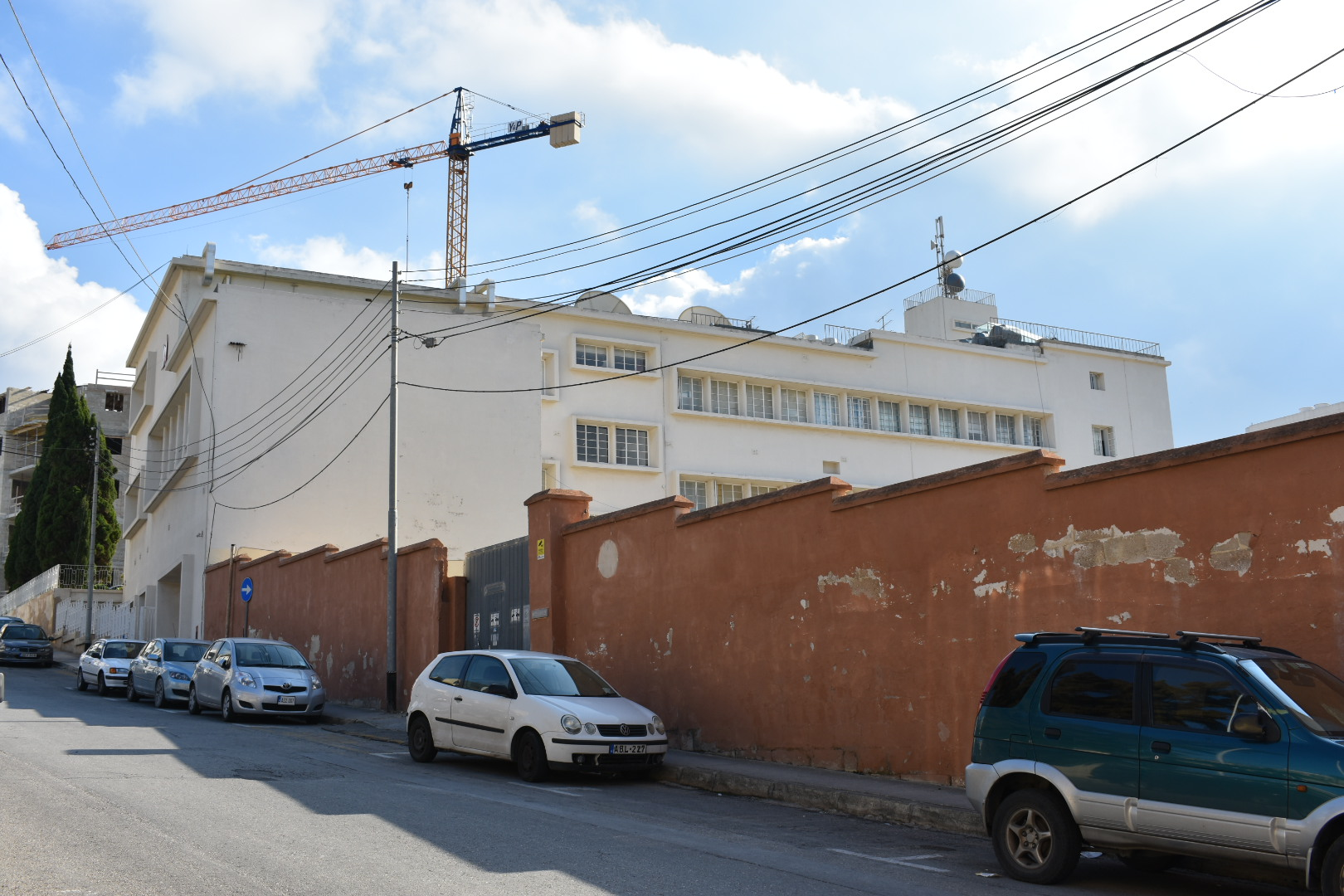
Rediffusion House as viewed from the rear

The proposed demolition was controversial, with Flimkien għal Ambjent Aħjar and the Chamber of Architects speaking out against the proposal, stating that both buildings are rare examples of quality Modernist architecture in Malta. In 2008, Prime Minister Lawrence Gonzi instructed PBS to withdraw the application, saving both buildings from demolition. This move was welcomed by the Chamber of Architects.

A restoration and renovation of the building began to be carried out in February 2012, and the building became known as the PBS Creativity Hub. It was reinaugurated by Prime Minister Gonzi on 28 December 2012. The renovation project cost a total of €3.1 million. The renovation received a Second Diploma award in 2013 by Din l-Art Helwa for the conservation and regeneration.

== Architecture ==
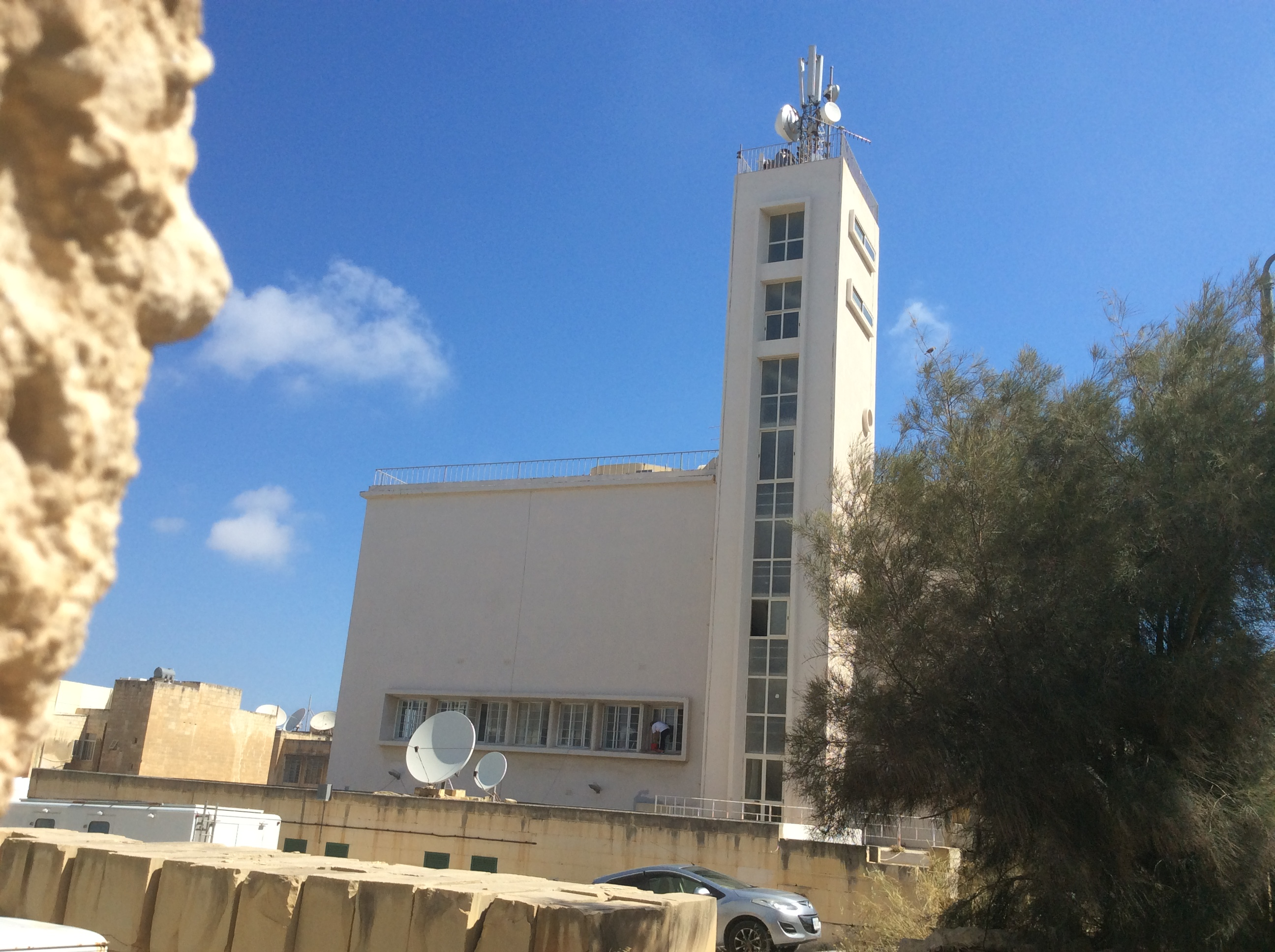
The tower on the other side of the building

Rediffusion House is a Modernist building, and it was one of the first non-educational institutional buildings to be built in that style in Malta. Through this style, the building projected broadcasting as being a future-oriented concept. It is considered to be one of the finest buildings of its type in Malta.

The building included offices, studios, control rooms and libraries. Features of the building include a canopy above the main entrance and a transmission tower with porthole-like apertures. The main façade has long horizontal windows and the entire building is painted white. These features give the building a characteristic Modernist aesthetic. A distinctive clock similar to that found at the Broadcasting House in London was included in the building's original designs, but it was never installed since the funds intended for it were used to buy television equipment in the 1960s.

== Bibliography ==
- "Architects welcome preservation of Rediffusion House". Times of Malta. 29 May 2008. Archived from the original on 2 February 2019.
- Balzan, Jurgen (5 June 2013). "Public Broadcasting Services' Creativity Hub cost €3.1 million". Malta Today. Archived from the original on 2 February 2019.
- Bonnici, Joseph; Cassar, Michael (2004). A Chronicle of 20th Century Malta 1900–1999. BDL. p. 250. ISBN 9789990972276. OL 19927519M.
- Borg, Joseph; Lauri, Mary Anne (2008). "DTV in Malta". In Wendy Van den Broeck; Jo Pierson (eds.). Digital Television in Europe. COST. ISBN 9789054875413.
- Camilleri; Cuschieri (4 January 2013). "PBS Creativity Hub". Camilleri and Cuschieri Consulting Engineers. Archived from the original on 30 August 2018.
- Connolly, Margaret; Pragnell, Mervyn O. (1975). The International Yearbook and Statesman's Who's Who. Bowker British Library Kicko. p. 287. ISBN 9780610005008.
- Debono, James (19 September 2007). "TV House to make way for flats". Malta Today. Archived from the original on 15 January 2018.
- Debono, James (23 February 2012). "Rediffusion House to get facelift". Malta Today. Archived from the original on 2 February 2019.
- "Gonzi launches PBS news portal and online digital media hub". Malta Today. 29 December 2012. Archived from the original on 2 February 2019.
- Grech, Herman (18 May 2008). "PM stops demolition of broadcasting houses". Times of Malta. Archived from the original on 2 February 2019.
- Micallef, Mark (24 April 2008). "Broadcasting landmarks may be demolished". Times of Malta. Archived from the original on 2 February 2019.
- Micallef, Antonia (11 November 2015). "Rediffusion in Malta started 80 years ago today". Television Malta. Archived from the original on 4 December 2017.
- Muscat, Mark Geoffrey (2016). "Post-War Manifestations". Maltese Architecture 1900–1970: Progress and Innovations. Valletta: Fondazzjoni Patrimonju Malti. ISBN 978-99909-3-206-5.
- "PBS Withdraws application to demolish Broadcasting House". The Malta Independent. 20 May 2008. Archived from the original on 3 February 2019.
- Planning Authority (20 April 2001). "No. 349 – Development Planning Act, 1992 (Section 46) – Scheduling of property" (PDF). Malta Government Gazette. Archived from the original (PDF) on 2 February 2019.
- "Public Broadcasting Services". Ministry for Justice, Culture and Local Government. Archived from the original on 6 January 2018.
- Sant, Toni (2016). Remembering Rediffusion in Malta: A history without future?. Santa Venera: Midsea Books. ISBN 978-99932-7-568-8. Archived from the original on 3 December 2019.
- Thake, Conrad (July 2008). "The ex-Rediffusion Broadcasting Complex, Guardamangia" (PDF). The Architect (45). Chamber of Architects. Archived from the original (PDF) on 2 February 2019.
- Thake, Conrad (2014b). "Architecture in Post-Independence Malta: Past, Present and Future". Melita Historica. XVI (3): 89–100.
- Thake, Conrad, ed. (February 2014a). "Din l-Art Helwa Awards for Architectural Heritage 2013" (PDF). The Architect (64): 12–14.
- Xuereb, Mario (12 September 2017). "Why was the clock on PBS building never installed?". Television Malta. Archived from the original on 13 January 2018.
