= Villa Guardamangia =

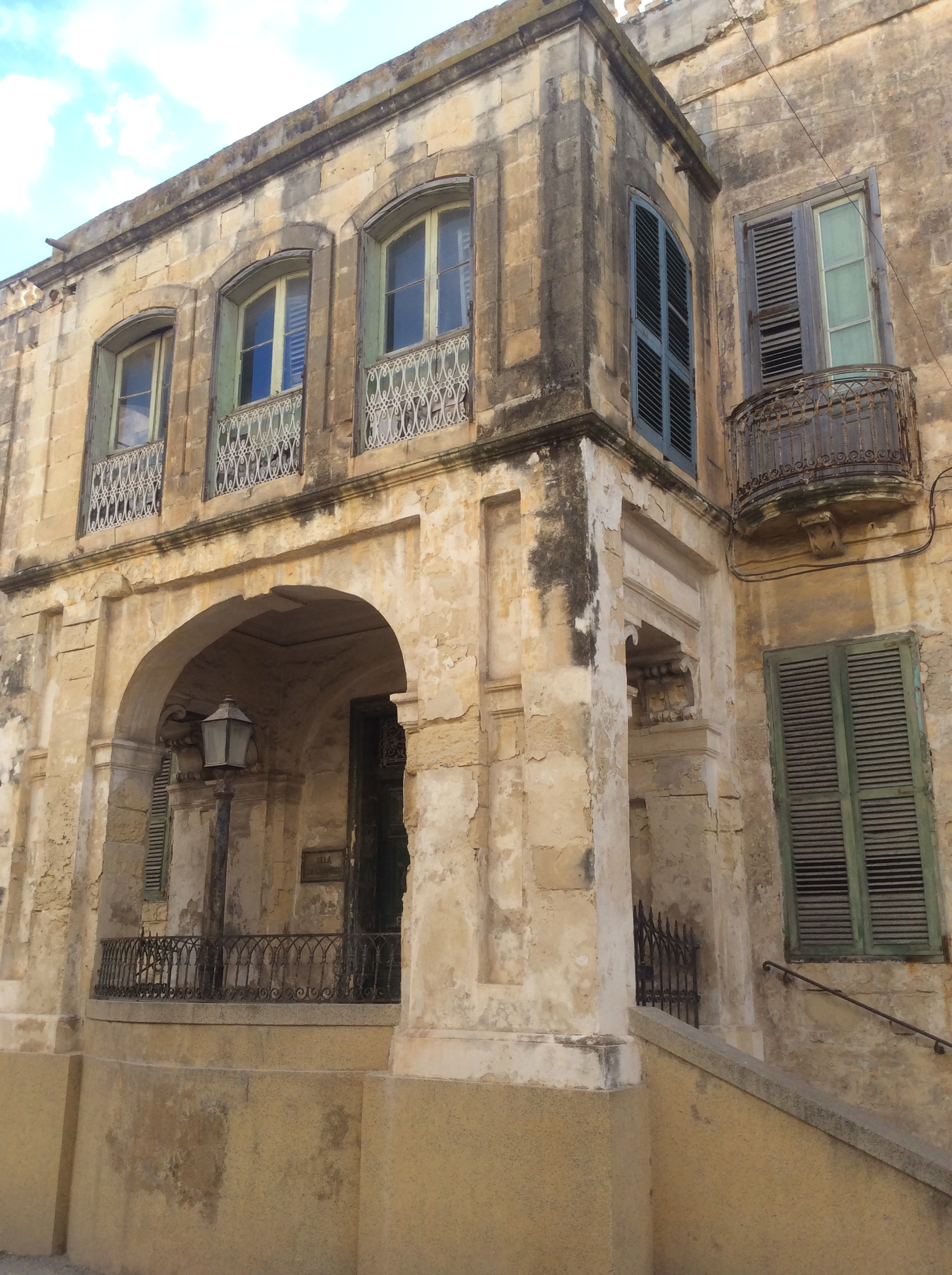
- 49, Guardamangia Hill, Pietà, Malta
- Interactive map of the Villa Guardamangia area
- Former names: Casa Medina
- Alternative names: Casa Guardamangia

General information
- Status: Intact
- Type: Villa
- Architectural style: Vernacular and Neoclassical
- Location: Gwardamanġa, Pietà, Malta
- Coordinates: 35°53′32.1″N 14°29′42.2″E
- Completed: Mid-18th century
- Owner: Government of Malta

Technical details
- Material: Limestone

Villa Guardamangia (Italian – 'look' and 'eat'), formerly known as Casa Medina and sometimes referred to as Casa Guardamangia, is a 16,791-square-foot (1,559.9 m^{2}) townhouse in Gwardamanġa, Pietà, Malta, which served as the residence of Princess Elizabeth, Duchess of Edinburgh (later Queen Elizabeth II), and Prince Philip, Duke of Edinburgh, between 1949 and 1951, while Philip was stationed in Malta as a serving Royal Navy officer.

== History ==
The property belonged to a Catholic priest in around 1814, at the start of the British colonisation of Malta. It is believed that the seaside property was built around the mid-18th century. Later, in the 20th century, it belonged to several prominent Maltese families, which included the Sant Fourniers, Bartolos and Schembris. The building was given much of its present appearance around 1900 by its then owner, Sir Augusto Bartolo, when the mansion was called Casa Medina. It was originally a farmhouse. It consists of 18 rooms in the living quarters, stables for the animals, a large garden area with a walk-path and a war shelter.

Around 1929, the villa was first leased to the then Lord Louis Mountbatten, who had interest in it because of its proximity to Marsa, which has a horse racing track and a golf course that suited his lavish lifestyle. The villa was in a bad state and divided into apartments, leading the Mountbattens to reside in two rooms at the Hotel Phoenicia in Floriana while the house was being renovated. Mountbatten bought the villa after some time, and frequented it while stationed in Malta as Commander-in-Chief of the Mediterranean Fleet in the 1950s, by which time he was fully styled as Admiral of the Fleet The 1st Earl Mountbatten of Burma.

When the Duke and Duchess of Edinburgh came to Malta at first they lodged at San Anton Palace, hosted by Lord Strickland and his wife. Princess Elizabeth (later Queen Elizabeth II) and her then-fiancé, Lieutenant Philip Mountbatten, R.N. (formerly Prince Philip of Greece and Denmark, and later Prince Philip, Duke of Edinburgh), first stayed at Villa Guardamangia in 1946. The couple returned a number of times between then and 1952, while Philip was stationed in Malta as a Royal Navy officer, and Elizabeth worked with the Soldiers, Sailors, Airmen Families Association (SSAFA) at Auberge de Castile. Lord Mountbatten of Burma eventually passed the villa to the royal couple and they resided there continuously between 1949 and 1951. It has been suggested that their eldest child, King Charles III, was conceived at the villa. The Queen later described her stay in Malta as one of the best periods of her life, as it was the only time she was able to live "normally".

Queen Elizabeth II visited Villa Guardamangia during her state visit to Malta in 1992 and, in 2007, she and the Duke of Edinburgh celebrated their 60th wedding anniversary there. The Queen was given a painting of Villa Guardamangia by the Maltese High Commissioner in London, Norman Hamilton, in 2013. When the Queen was in Malta for the Commonwealth Heads of Government Meeting in November 2015, she asked to see the villa, but was reportedly refused by its owners, the family of Ġużè Schembri, as it was in a poor state of repair and the subject of a dispute between its owners and the government. President Marie Louise Coleiro Preca presented the Queen with another painting of the villa's façade.

The building was put up for sale in 2019 with an asking price of €5.9 million. Much of the building's contents, including furniture, artwork and antiques, were sold at auction in September 2019. Following a campaign for the building to be restored and opened to the public, it was acquired by the Government of Malta in October 2019 and entrusted to Heritage Malta for extensive restoration works.

== Building and gardens ==
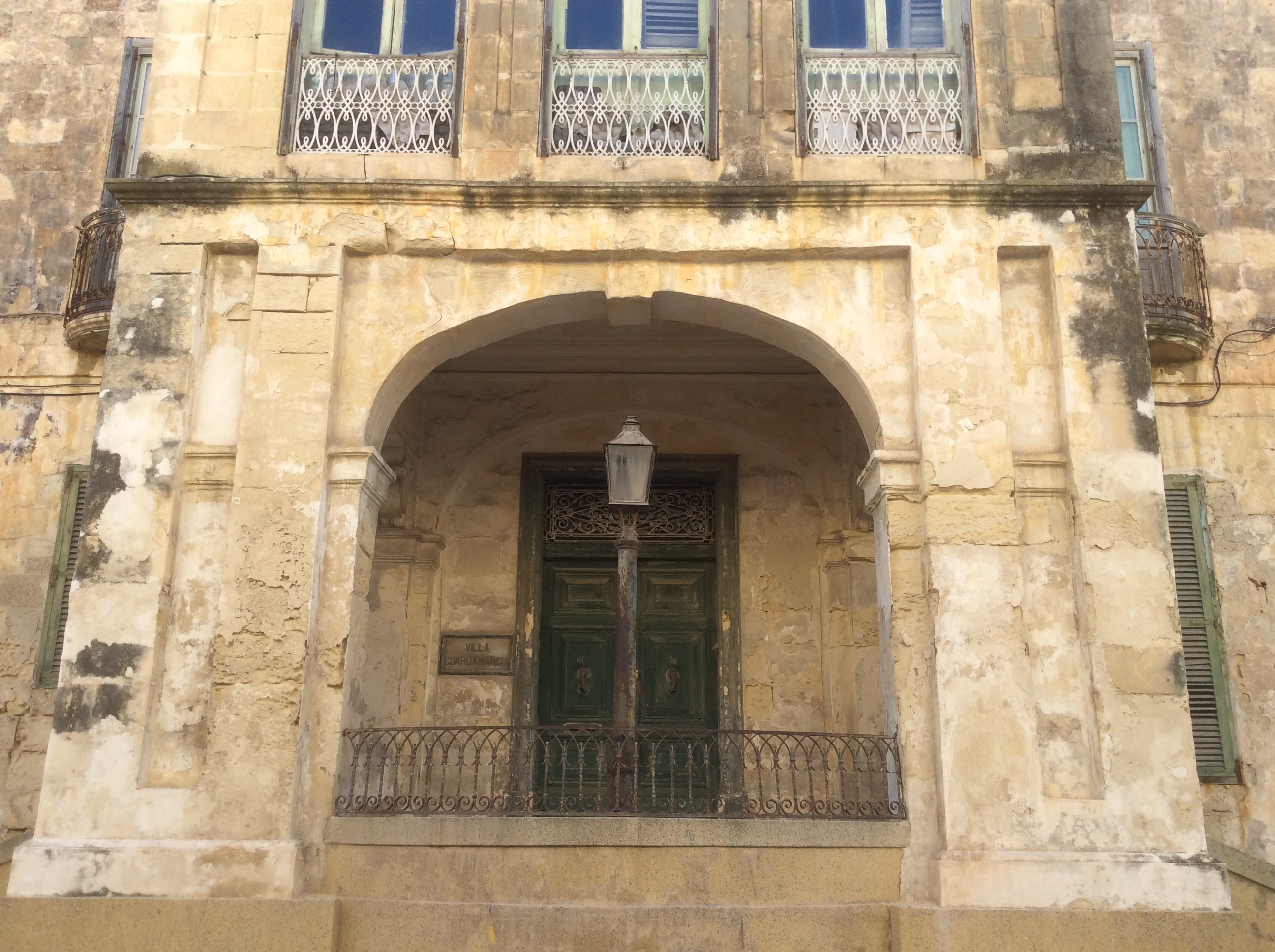
Front façade with plaque reading "Villa Guardamangia".

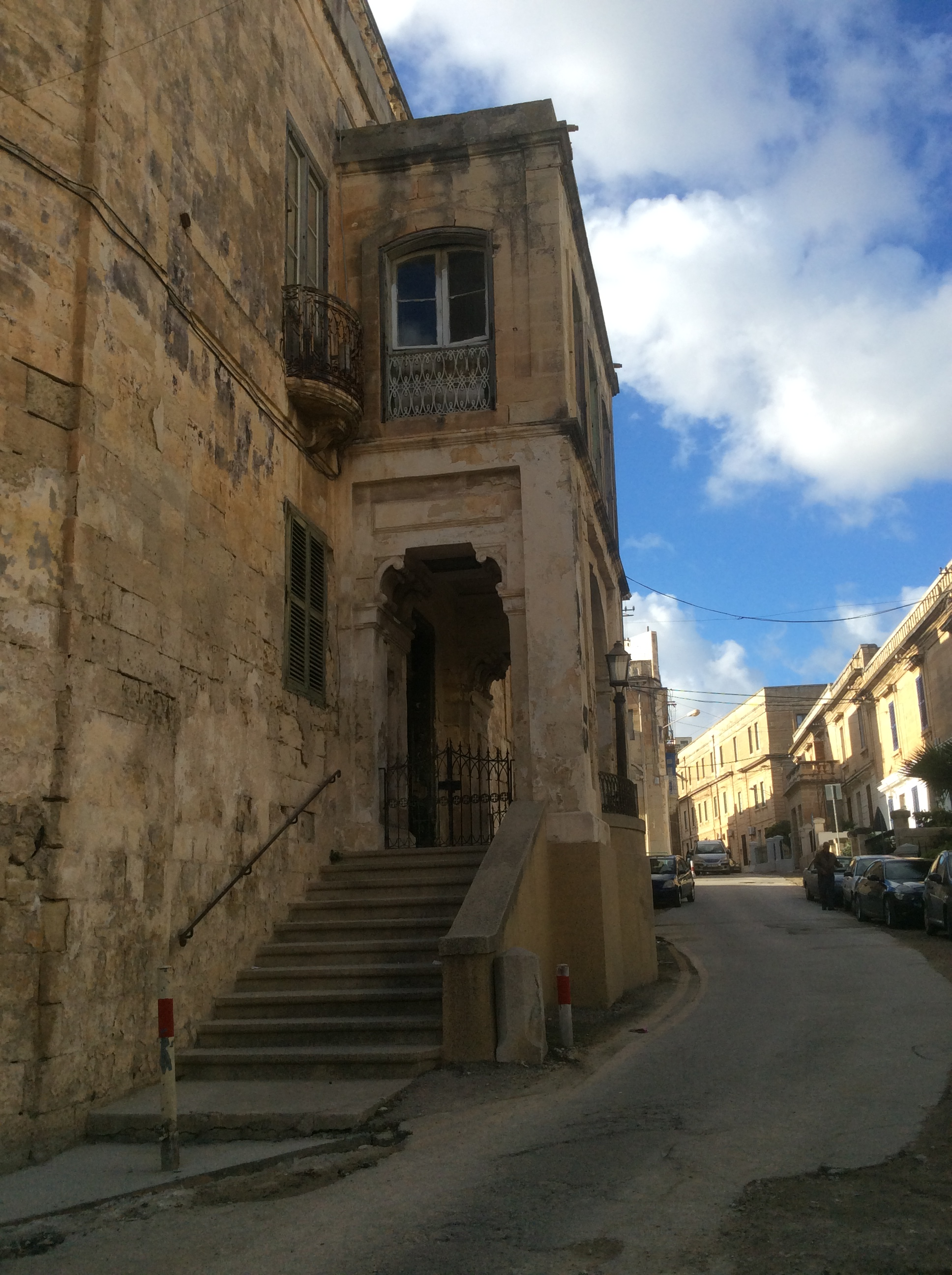
The Villa is in a dilapidated state.

The villa is found just outside the outskirts and suburb of Valletta in the hamlet of Guardamangia set just at the crest in a quiet residential area in a narrow street. The villa is described as built in the form of a palace complemented with sea views over Marsamxett Harbour. The Queen describes it as a "town house". It is a typical traditional Maltese residence. The building is built with limestone, known as sandstone and described by the Queen as "yellow stone", and designed with spacious interiors. The house has two entrances with one set at street level and another set after going up a flight of stairs under an elaborate front porch. The royal family had taken their own personal belongings from Britain when they lived at the villa allowing them to live in a lavish residence, in a once-elegant home. The royal family had British servants at the villa.

The gardens of the villa are secluded. The Queen has described it simply as the "small garden at Villa Guardamangia". The Queen herself had decorated the gardens and the surroundings according to her tastes and lifestyle, however most garden-related work was done by a gardener. The main outdoor feature in the garden is the long terrace taking from the building of the villa to the other side of the garden. In the middle of the terrace is where a bench stood that is the place where most known published photos of the royal couple and guests were taken. Other photos were taken on the roof terrace of the villa, while some were taken by the press back then at the front of the villa while the couple walked in on the flight of stairs. The garden had a function to entertain and also to cultivate flowers, which Prince Philip enjoyed to have in his cabin and wardroom.

== Current ==
The building is scheduled as a Grade 2 monument by the Malta Environment and Planning Authority and it is in a dilapidated state. The NGO Flimkien għal Ambjent Aħjar has called for its restoration and the government was then in process to expropriate and restore the villa, accusing its then owners of allowing the villa to deteriorate in order to justify demolishing it so that the site can be sold and redeveloped.

Villa Guardamangia is a potential tourist attraction once restored. In a non-scientific 2015 online poll, 84% of respondents stated that they would visit the villa if it were restored and opened to the public. The villa is a common landmark associated with the royal family. The Daily Telegraph has mistakenly portrayed the front façade of Villa Luginsland in Rabat as the back of Villa Guardamangia.

Villa Guardamangia was privately owned by Marika Schembri and her siblings. In June 2019, the Villa was put up for sale for €6 million (£5.3 million). However, it was bought for €5 million. Since October 2019, the villa has belonged to the Government of Malta. As of June 2020, Heritage Malta (the national agency for cultural heritage) is conducting extensive restoration works on the villa. The British Royal Family will be invited for the villa's reopening.

On 9 October 2024, Prince Edward and his wife, Sophie, the Duchess of Edinburgh, visited the villa. They made this visit during the 60-year anniversary of Malta's independence.

== Images ==
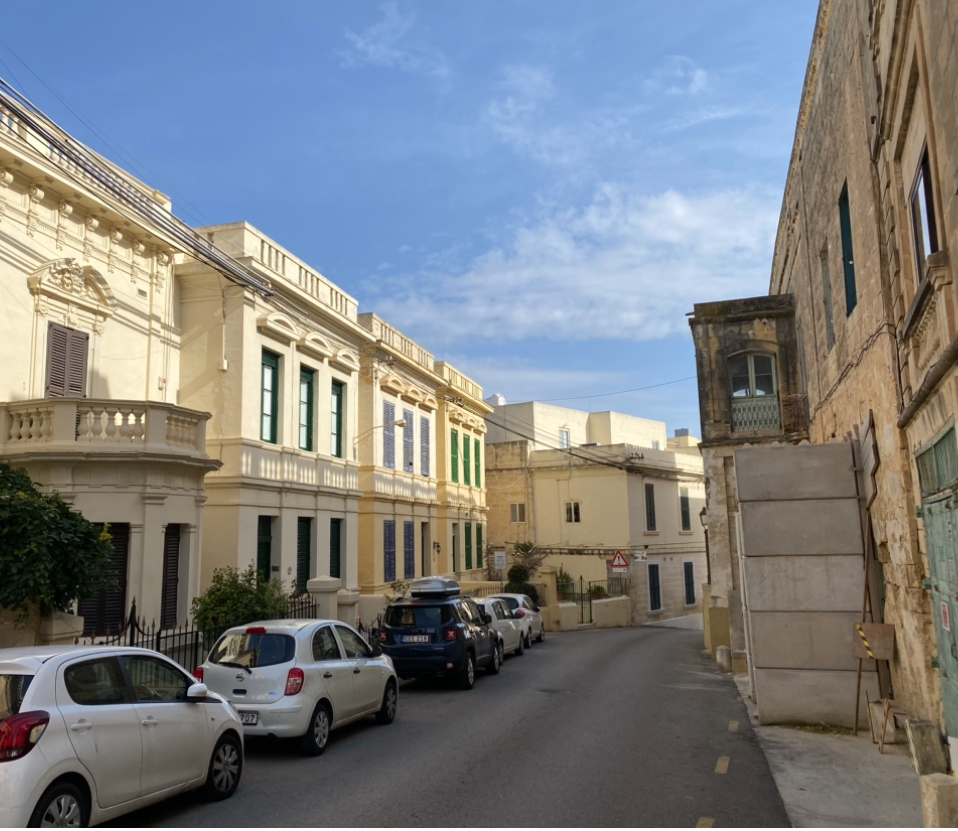
The street where Villa Guardamangia is located in 2024.

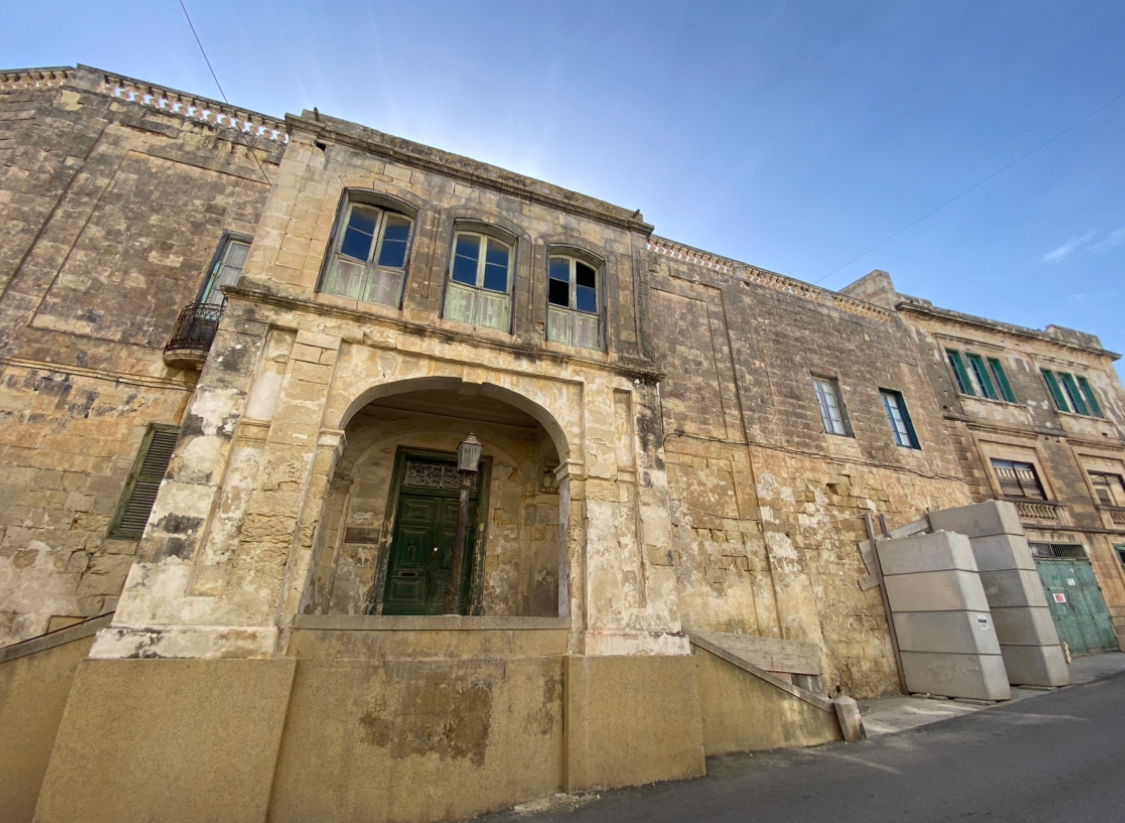
Villa Guardamangia in 2024.

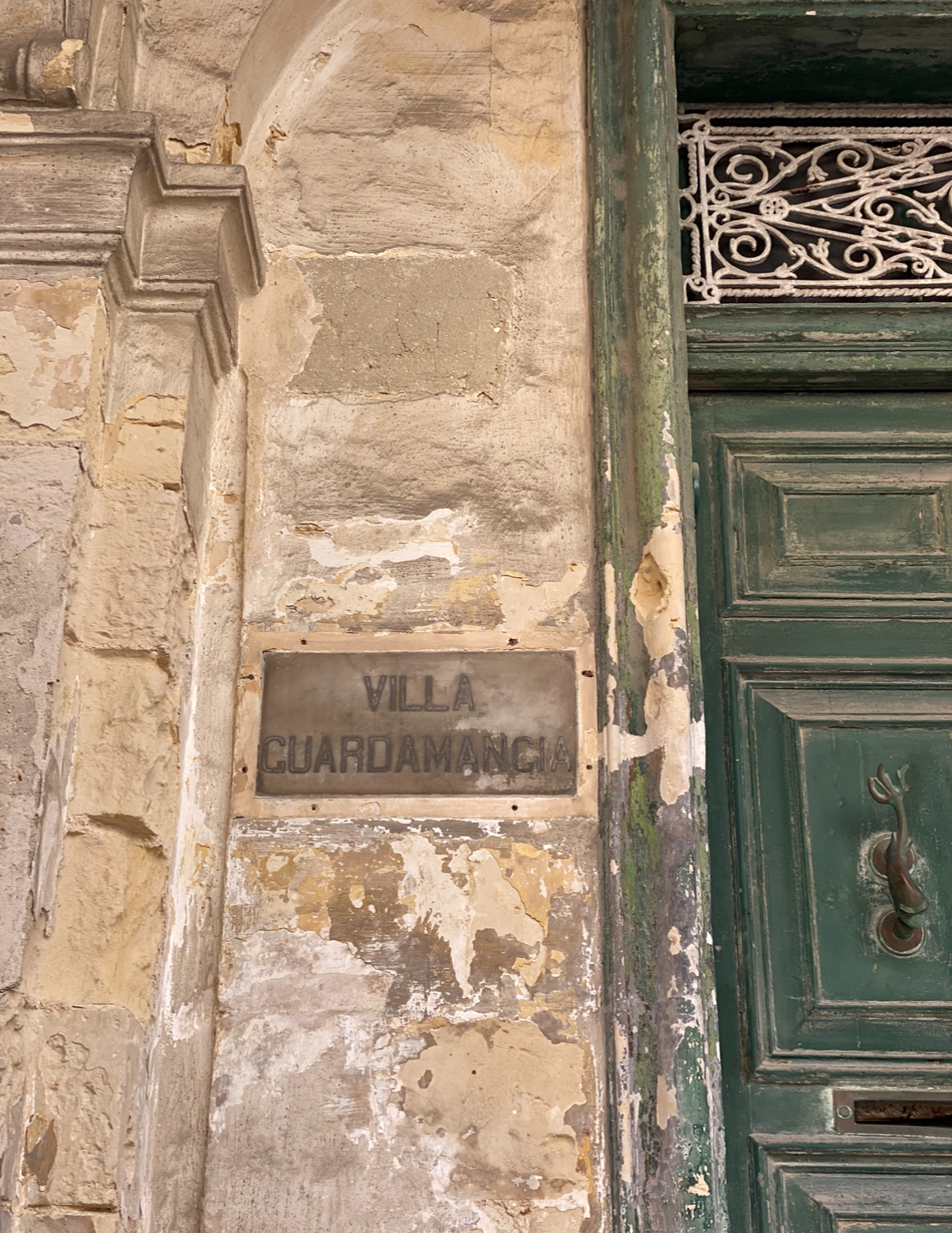
Sign that reads "Villa Guardamangia".

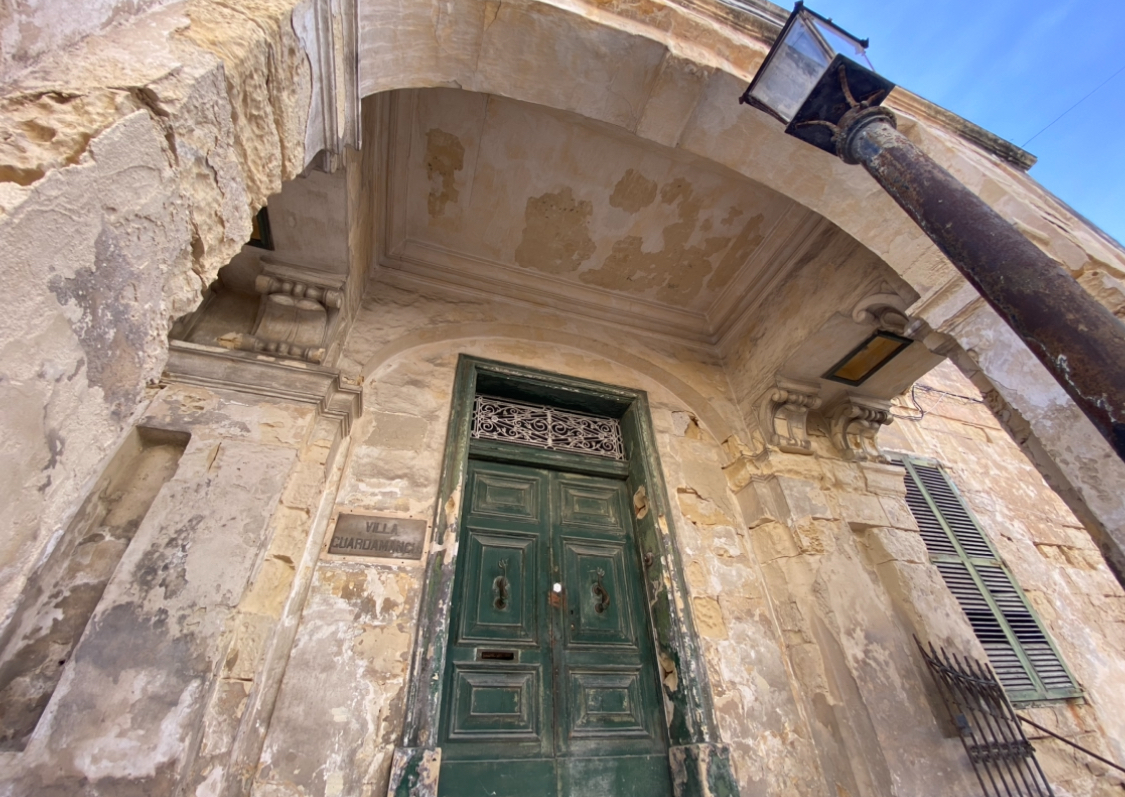
The entrance to the villa.

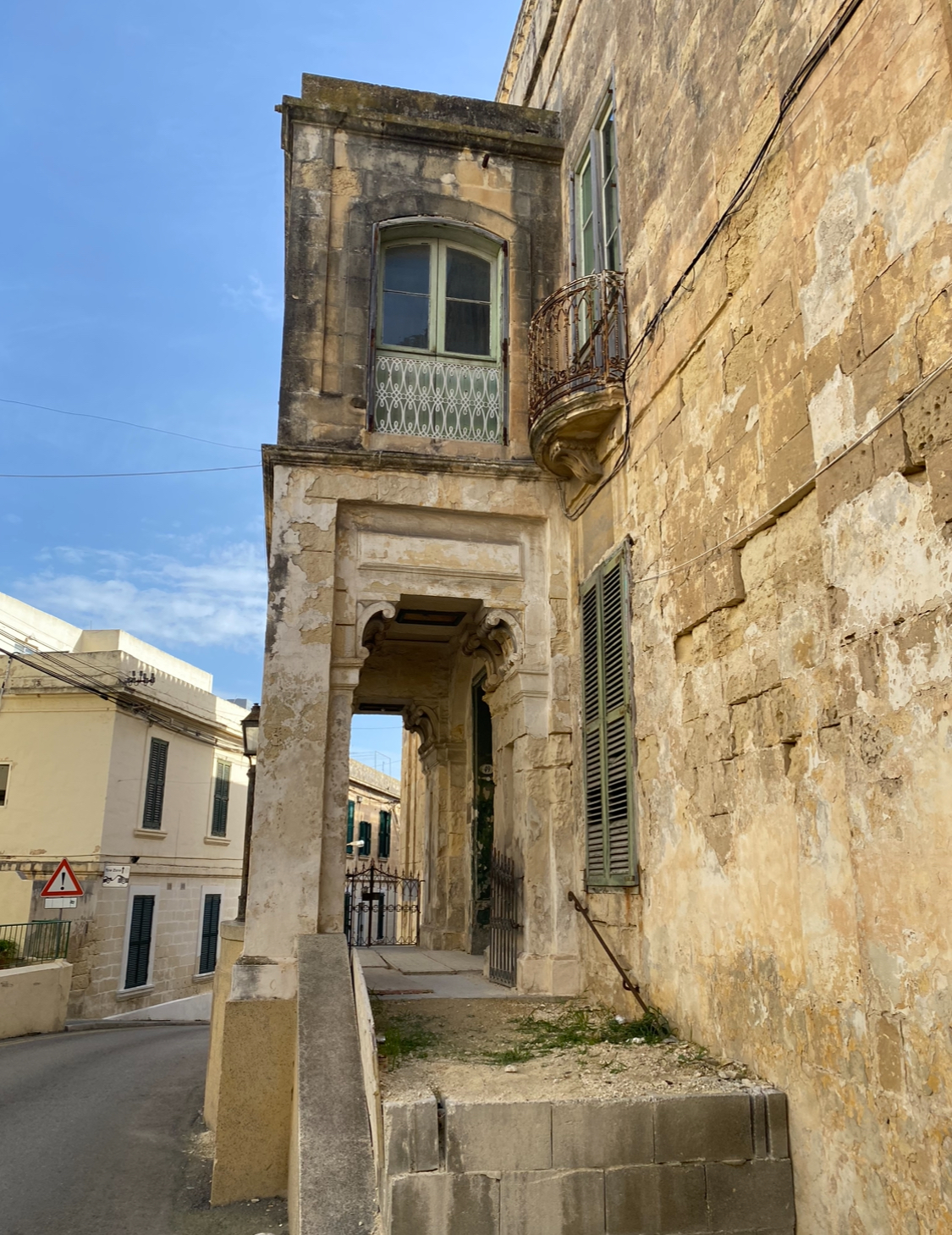
The entrance to the villa seen from the street in 2024.

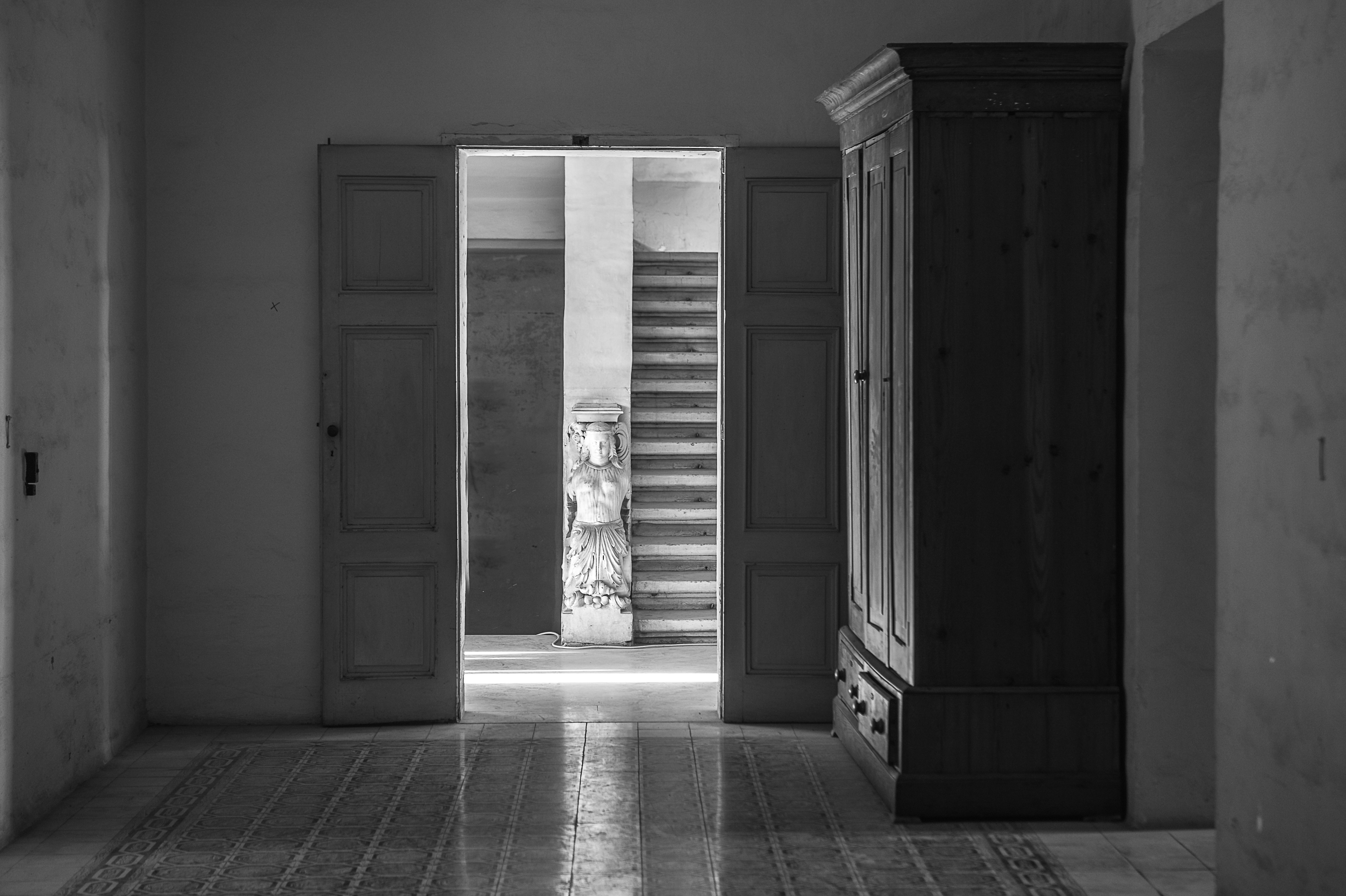
Photograph of the interior of the villa.

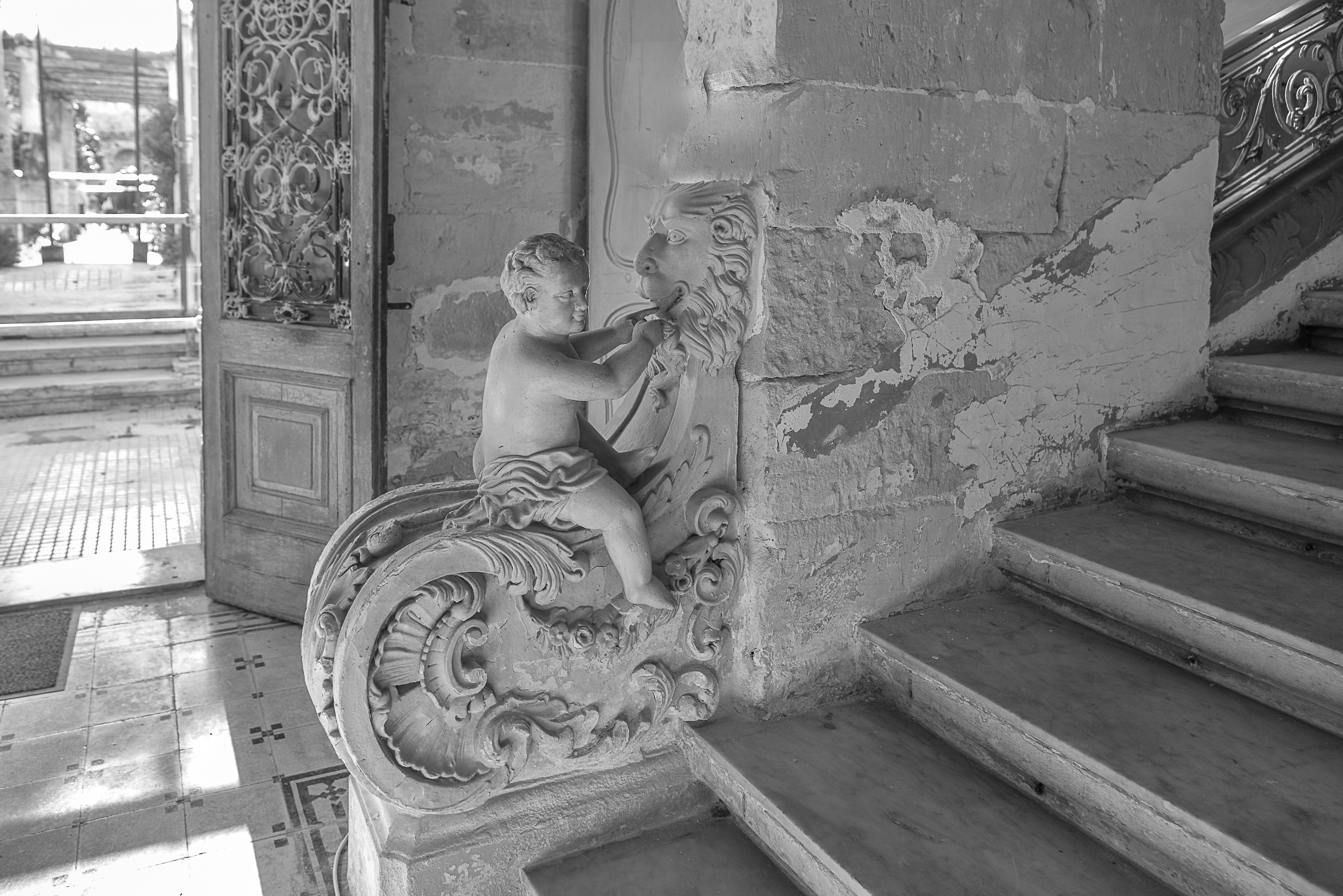
Photograph showing a detail inside the villa by a staircase.
