= Rediffusion =

Radio and television company

Rediffusion was a business that distributed radio and TV signals through wired relay networks. The business gave rise to a number of other companies, including Associated-Rediffusion, later known as Rediffusion London, the first ITV (commercial television) franchisee to go on air in the UK. Rediffusion also spawned a record label, Rediffusion International Music, in 1968 (which was also responsible for the short-lived Koala label).

Redifon was the name used, until 1981, for companies in the capital goods businesses of Rediffusion, namely Redifon Computers, Redifon Flight Simulation and Redifon Telecommunications.

The Rediffusion brand has been revived and is currently used in China on consumer electrical products and on LED televisions in the UK.

== Early history ==
Rediffusion was the trading name of Broadcast Relay Service Limited, founded in March 1928 for Joshua Powell (9 May 1871 – October 1946).

In January 1929, the company introduced its first cable radio service in Hull to customers frustrated with the difficulties of tuning in weak radio broadcasts. In the customer premises, nothing more than a selector switch and loudspeaker were needed. Initially, the service consisted primarily of rebroadcasts of the BBC Radio service, which was reflected in the trading name: Rediffusion simply means "broadcasting again".

Rediffusion quickly branched out into making, renting, and selling radios, both receivers for its cable services and conventional models. With the arrival of the first experimental television broadcasts in the 1930s, Rediffusion began manufacturing TV sets and supplying "Piped TV", an early form of cable TV service, to its customers, until the cessation of television broadcasts during the Second World War.

The first British colony to have the Rediffusion service was Barbados in 1934, when Radio Distribution (Barbados) Limited was formed.

A year later, Rediffusion started operating in Malta. Transmissions in Malta started from Hamrun on 11 November 1935, under the name of "Broadcast Relay Service Malta Limited", with Charles Whotcroft and George Powler the first manager and chief engineer, respectively.

== Post-war ==
In 1947, British Electric Traction (BET) acquired a substantial minority interest in Rediffusion. BET then acquired a controlling interest in 1967, and the remaining 36% of equity in 1983.

In 1948, Rediffusion established Redifon Ltd as a manufacturer of naval (and later flight) telecommunications equipment.

After the war, Rediffusion began operations in several of the then British colonies. These included holding the concessions for wired and over-the-air radio and television stations. A subsidiary company, Overseas Rediffusion, operated these stations and also sold advertising time and programming for them. Stations included the radio station Rediffusion Barbados, Hong Kong, Singapore, Malaysia, Thailand and the wired television service Rediffusion Television in Hong Kong, the latter later known as Asia Television. It also opened a company in Jersey in 1949, Rediffusion (Channel Islands) Limited, which obtained a licence to relay radio broadcasts from the States of Jersey in 1950. It also opened a manufacturing division in Jersey, Television Research Limited (TVR) which also provided research facilities for the wired network. This was established in 1952, and was renamed Reditronics Limited in 1976.

BET's financial resources enabled Rediffusion to capitalise on the growth in post war television, which restarted in 1946. Initially, the company installed cable TV systems in blocks of flats in London, and over the next few years expanded outside London. The company was also involved in the sale and rental of television sets.

== Expansion into broadcasting ==
With the passage of the Television Act 1954, Rediffusion joined forces with Associated Newspapers, a subsidiary of Daily Mail and General Trust, to form Associated-Rediffusion, and won the coveted London weekday ITV broadcast franchise. They began broadcasting on 22 September 1955.

During the partnership's first year, Associated-Rediffusion was losing money so fast that by the end of 1956, Associated Newspapers sold 80% of its stake back to BET and Rediffusion at a severe loss. Around this time, Associated-Rediffusion struck a very lucrative deal with Granada Television, the franchise holder for weekday broadcasts in the North of England. Granada was also losing money, and lacked the financial resources of BET; the deal guaranteed Granada a certain level of financial security, at the cost of Associated-Rediffusion receiving the vast majority of future profits from their arrangement.

On 29 September 1962, Rediffusion (Malta) Ltd. inaugurated a television service covering the Maltese islands.

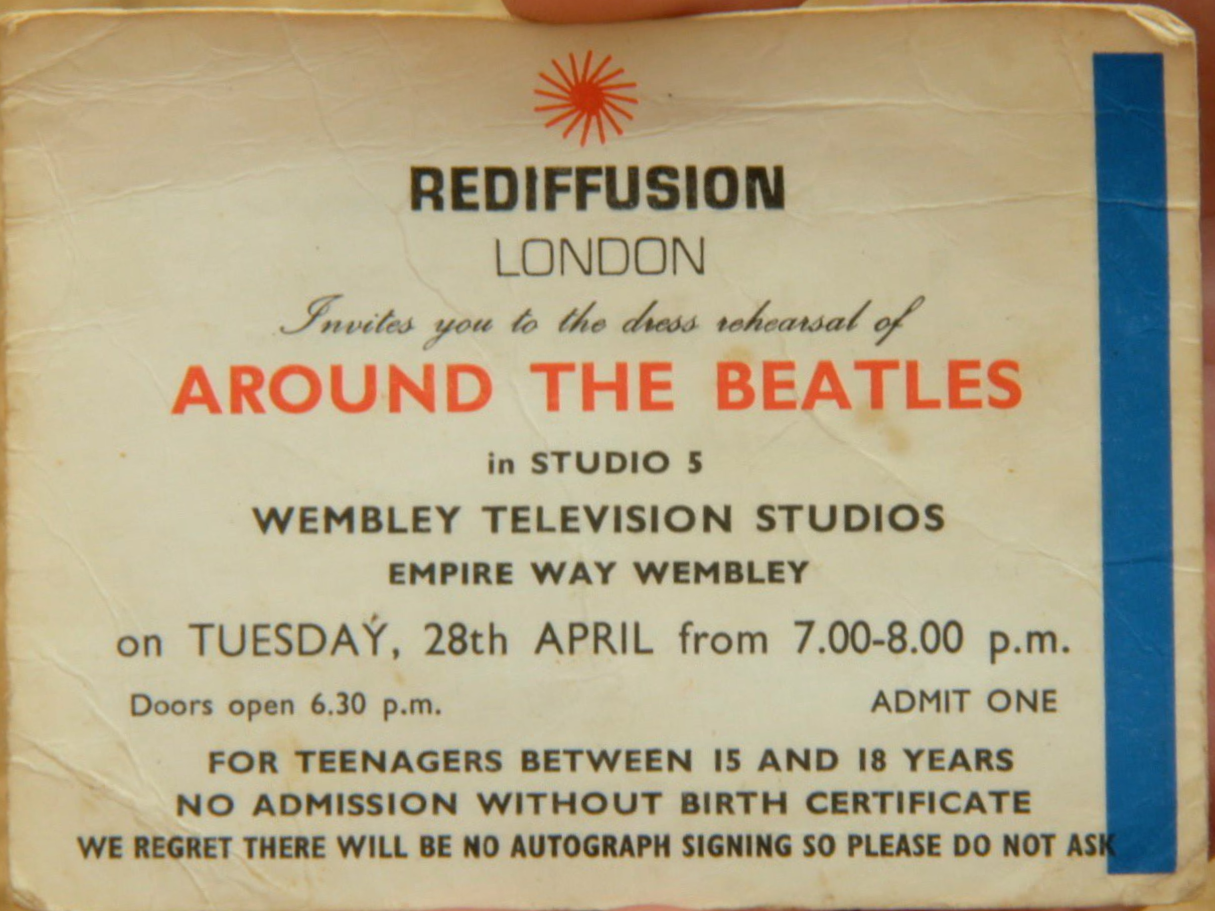
Rediffusion London ticket for an Around the Beatles dress rehearsal on 28 April 1964

By 1964, when Associated-Rediffusion changed its name to Rediffusion London, the efforts of the owners had left them sitting on a substantial cash pile, and it is arguable that this success may have led to the 1967 decision by the Independent Television Authority to effectively break up the company. Rediffusion London was ordered to merge with ABC Weekend TV, the holder of the weekend Midlands and North of England franchises, to form Thames Television, with ABC given the controlling interest (despite its generally weaker financial position) and Rediffusion holding 49%. Thames Television was given the new weekday London franchise, with ABC's existing franchises awarded to other companies.

== Other ventures ==
=== Rediffusion Cable ===
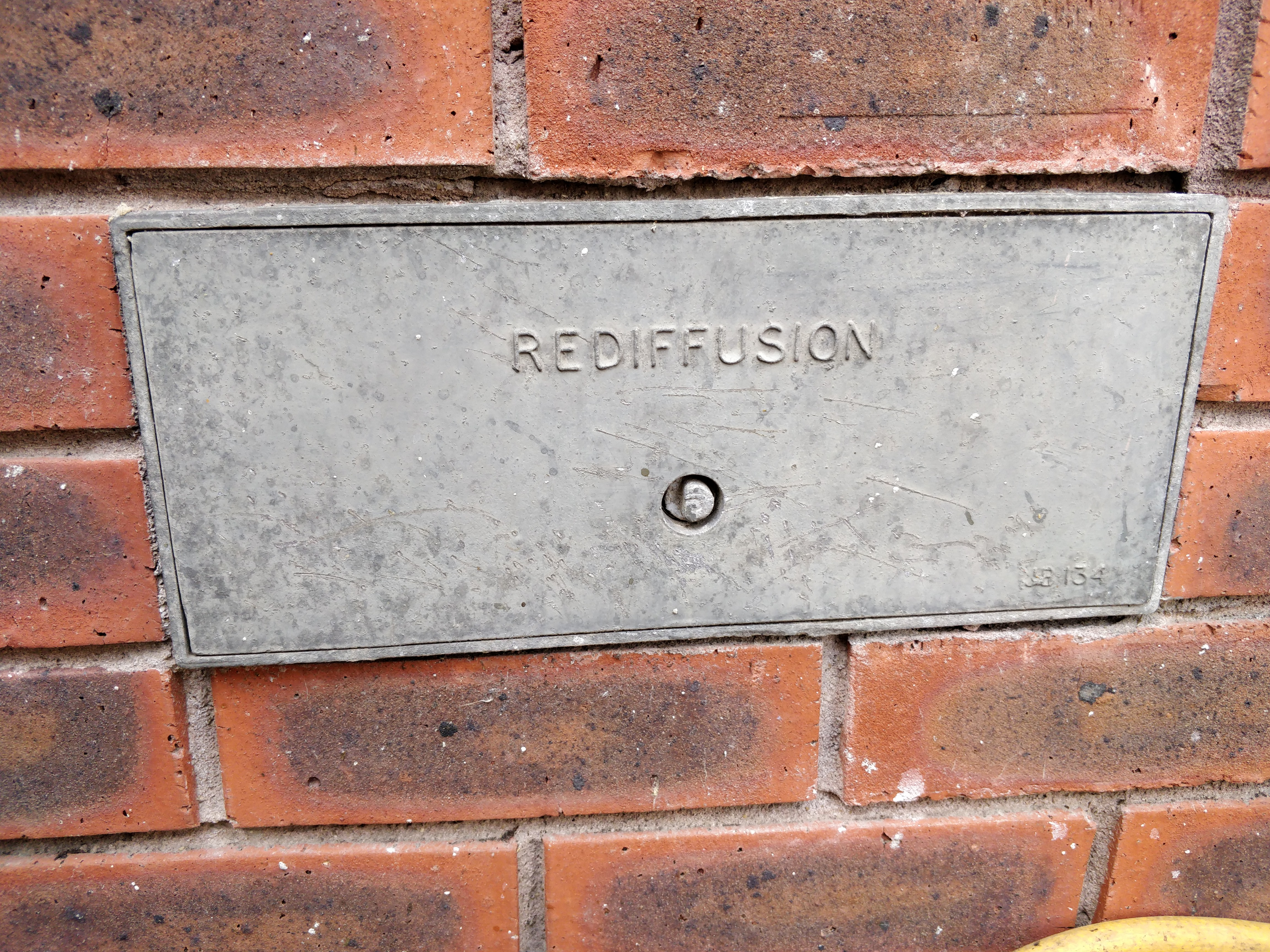
A Rediffusion junction box installed in the exterior wall of a London house

Rediffusion also offered a low-bandwidth cable TV and radio distribution system. This was based on connecting homes with multiple twisted-pair cables. Each pair carried a single TV or radio channel. The system was provided in most United Kingdom towns. Selection of TV or radio station was by means of a rotary switch, usually mounted on a wall or window frame close to the point of entry of the cable into the home. From this a two-wire cable led to the TV or radio. The TVs used on this system were stripped-down TV sets with no tuner or RF front-end and the radios were little more than a loudspeaker with a step down transformer and volume control. Rediffusion abandoned this system of TV and radio distribution by the end of the 1980s. The wall mounted switches, external junction boxes and street cable ducts are still visible in places that have not been redeveloped since the late 1980s.

=== Overseas Rediffusion ===
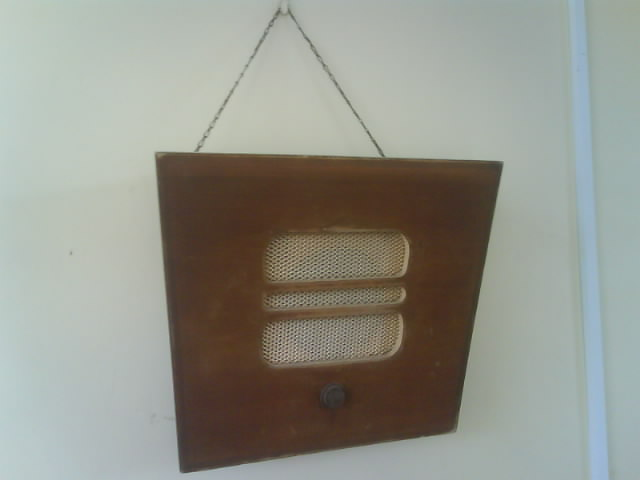
Long deactivated speaker for the Rediffusion located at the police station in Hastings, Christ Church, Barbados

BET and Rediffusion Limited had strong links with the former British colonies. These included holding the concessions for wired and over-the-air radio and television stations. A subsidiary company, Overseas Rediffusion, operated these stations and also sold advertising time and programming for them. Stations included the radio operations in Barbados, Sierra Leone, Singapore, Malaysia, Malta, Liberia, Thailand and the wired television service Rediffusion Television in Hong Kong, the latter now known as Asia Television.

=== Rediffusion Rentals ===
The Rediffusion retail chain, renting and servicing TVs, radios, VCRs and hi-fi systems, was common on high streets until it was bought by Granada Rentals in 1984.

== Last years ==
Rediffusion's television sale and rental operations continued to grow, particularly following the start of colour television broadcasts in 1967.

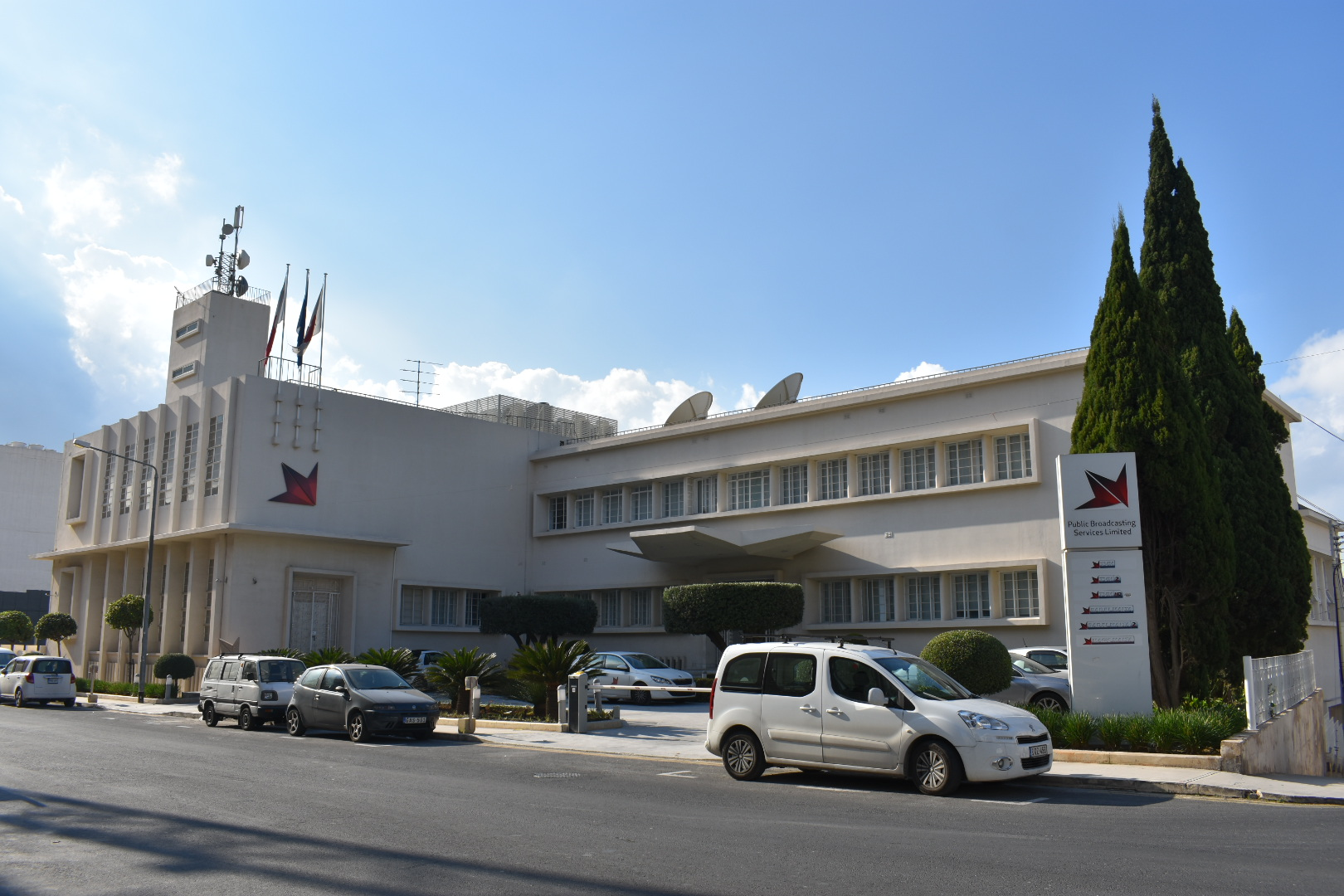
Ex-Rediffusion House Malta now known as P.B.S Creativity Hub in Gwardamanġa, built for Rediffusion (Malta) Ltd in 1958

On 14 February 1975, the employees of the Rediffusion (Malta) Ltd staged a sit-in strike at the company's premises in Malta and they even started to run the company. On 30 July 1975, an agreement was reached between Rediffusion Group of Companies and the Dom Mintoff led Labour Party government of Malta for the transfer of all Rediffusion's assets in Malta to the Maltese government.

The company also experimented with its local cable operations: a local community station in Bristol ("Bristol Channel") from 1973 to 1976, and an optical fibre system in Hastings in 1976.

Redifon, established in 1946, became a manufacturer of aircraft simulation in 1948, located at Crawley, West Sussex, UK. A subdivision was established at Arlington, Texas, US in 1968. In 1981, BET changed Redifon's name to Rediffusion Simulation to capitalise on the name. The company was sold in 1988 to Hughes Aircraft, which kept the Rediffusion name until it sold the company in 1994 to Thomson-CSF, when it was merged with Thomson's previous 1990 acquisition of Link-Miles to become Thomson Training & Simulation, later rebranded into Thales Training & Simulation. The fixed-wing division was sold to the L3 Group in 2012 which continues as L3 Commercial Training Solutions.

Redifon (later Rediffusion) Computers was also part of the group and was likewise based in Crawley, West Sussex. It initially started in the production of analogue computers to control flight simulators, then moved to produce minicomputers ("R range"), departmental Unix Servers and microcomputers ("teleputers"), specialising in data capture, enterprise accounting for local government and videotex systems. Michael Aldrich joined the company as marketing director in 1977, and became managing director and CEO in 1980.

From 1980, the company designed, manufactured, sold, installed and maintained online shopping systems mainly in the UK and achieved a significant number of world firsts. The company's name was changed to Rediffusion Computers in 1981. During the 1980s, a large part of the company's revenue came from its sales in Eastern Europe and Russia. Equipment that met the CoCom directive for the sales of high performance technology to the Soviet Bloc was supplied to a number of customers the largest of which was Gazprom who used the systems on the Siberian Gas Pipeline project. In addition there was a steady stream of Polish engineers attending the Crawley training facility to enable them to support and maintain this equipment mainly in Russia but also in other countries in the Eastern Bloc.

The company was highly innovative and amongst other things developed a signature recognition system for detecting cheque fraud. It was one of the first companies to sell a turnkey solution that utilised the newly available Post Office database (PAF) for postcode recognition. In 1984, Aldrich led a management buyout and the company became ROCC Computers (Rediffusion's Old Computer Company). Aldrich was the largest shareholder and he subsequently bought-out the other shareholders.

In the 1980s, Rediffusion's cable operations were left behind by the new generation of cable TV networks. BET (from 1983 the sole owners of Rediffusion) began divesting and sold off its overseas interests, and at the end of the 1980s, the company was broken up, The rentals business went to Granada, and the cable network systems were sold to Maxwell Communications.

Reditronics Jersey was sold to SCK Holdings Limited in 1986, and following BET's retreat from cable and the consequent loss of associated contracts, it ceased trading in 1987. The Rediffusion Jersey cable network was sold to Jersey Cable Limited (now Newtel Solutions) in 1988.

In 1991, a Hong Kong-based branch of the company, now known as Asia Television, returned telerecording copies of all four episodes of The Tomb of the Cybermen, a Doctor Who serial, to the BBC. The prints were in good condition, and the episodes were thought to have been lost for roughly fifteen years.

== See also ==
- Associated-Rediffusion
- Rediffusion Singapore
- Rediffusion Television (Hong Kong)
