= Parliament TV (Malta) =

Ownership
- Owner: Public Broadcasting Services (Government of Malta)

History
- Launched: 4 May 2015

Availability

Terrestrial
- Free-to-air: 43 (UHF)
- GO: 108
- Melita: 109

Parliament TV is a terrestrial television network in Malta that broadcasts the proceedings of the Parliament of Malta. It was established in 2015 following the relocation of Parliament to the new parliament building in Valletta.

Prior to 2012, proceedings of Parliament were not broadcast in video form but audio coverage of parliamentary debates was carried on Radju Malta 2.

Parliament began a pilot project in May 2012 to webcast debate and committee meetings live over the internet until Parliament relocated to its new building which was properly set up for live television broadcasting.

The channel is operated by the national broadcaster Public Broadcasting Services under an agreement with the Parliament of Malta.
