= Magic Malta =

Maltese Radio Station by PBS Ltd.

Magic
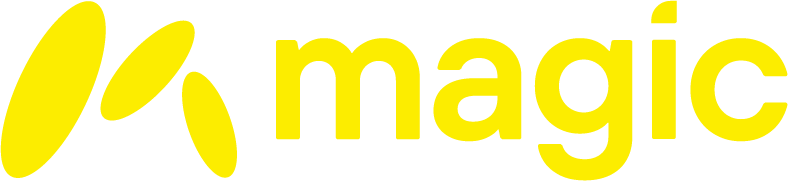
- Current logo
- Malta
- Frequency: 91.7 MHz

Programming
- Languages: Maltese and English
- Format: Pop music

Ownership
- Owner: Public Broadcasting Services (Government of Malta)
- Sister stations: Radju Malta, Radju Malta 2

History
- First air date: 21 August 2003; 23 years ago

Technical information
- Transmitter coordinates: 35°53′31″N 14°29′32″E

Links
- Website: magic.mt

Former logo (2016–2024)

Magic Malta (also known as Magic 91.7) is a music radio station in Malta operated by Public Broadcasting Services, the Maltese government's public broadcaster.

This station gives a big importance to music and caters to most ages. Music varies from current hits to those 1970s, 1980s, 1990s memories, as well as favourite pop music from the 21st century (its format is similar to Austrian pop station Hitradio Ö3). Local talent is also featured on Magic Malta.

Former Magic Malta logo (2007–2011)

In November 2024, Magic Malta went through a refresh which brought shows such as Carlo's Breakfast Café, Arthur's Drive, and making way for former 89.7 Bay radio duo Daniel & Ylenia return as hosts in Magic Drive.

News bulletins on Magic Malta are provided by the BBC at 08:00, 09:00, 12:00, 17:00 and 18:00 daily.
