= Radju Malta 2 =

Radio Malta 2 (Radju Malta 2)

Malta
- Broadcast area: Malta
- Frequency: 105.9 MHz

Programming
- Language: Maltese
- Format: Public radio

Ownership
- Owner: Public Broadcasting Services (Government of Malta)
- Sister stations: Radju Malta, Magic Malta

History
- Former frequencies: 106.6 MHz

Technical information
- Transmitter coordinates: 35°53′31″N 14°29′32″E

Links
- Website: tvmi.mt/live/7

Radio Malta 2 (Maltese: Radju Malta 2) is a radio station in Malta. It is owned and operated by the Public Broadcasting Services of Malta.

Broadcasting on 105.9 FM across the Maltese islands, it provides music programmes as well as cultural, scientific, artistic, environmental and educational focused programmes.

Live coverage of debates in the Maltese Parliament are also broadcast.

It previously operated under the names: Buzz FM, TEN-66 FM, Radju Parlament and Maltin Biss.

Former Radio Malta 2 logo, previously known as Maltin Biss

Former logo used from 2011 to 2024
