= Gwardamanġa =

Gwardamanġa Guardamangia
- Suburb
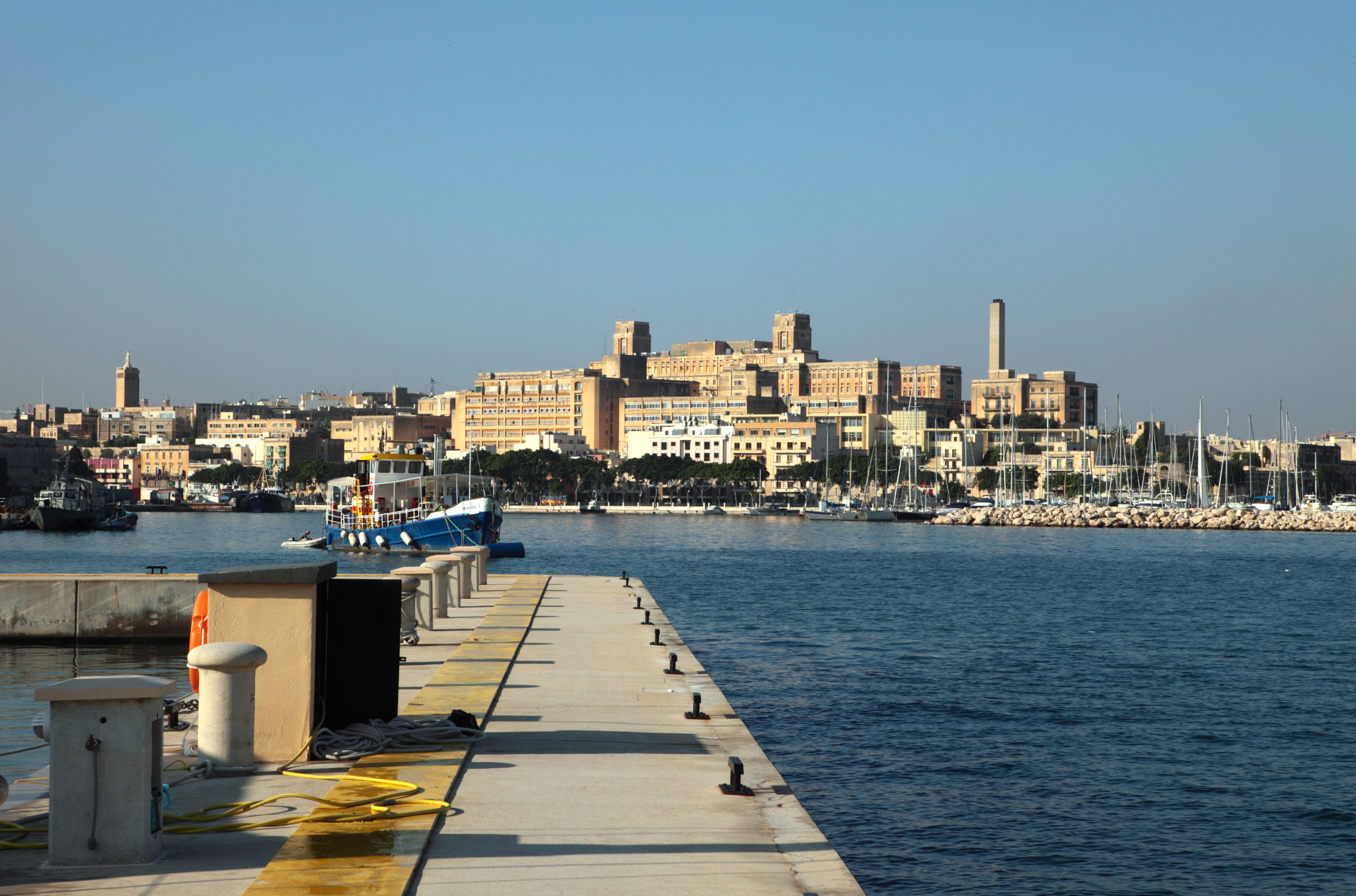
- Saint Luke's Hospital, in Gwardamanġa
- Interactive map of Gwardamanġa
- Coordinates: 35°53′35″N 14°29′37″E
- Country: Malta
- Island: Malta
- Suburb of: Pietà
- Time zone: UTC+1 (CET)
  - Summer (DST): UTC+2 (CEST)
- Postal code: PTA
- Dialing code: 356

Gwardamanġa (English: Guardamangia or sometimes incorrectly written as Gwarda Mangia) is a hamlet in Pietà, Malta. Gwardamanġa is the home of St. Luke's Hospital, Malta's former general public hospital, and Villa Guardamangia, the former home of Queen Elizabeth II. It is also the location of the Rediffusion House.

== Overview ==
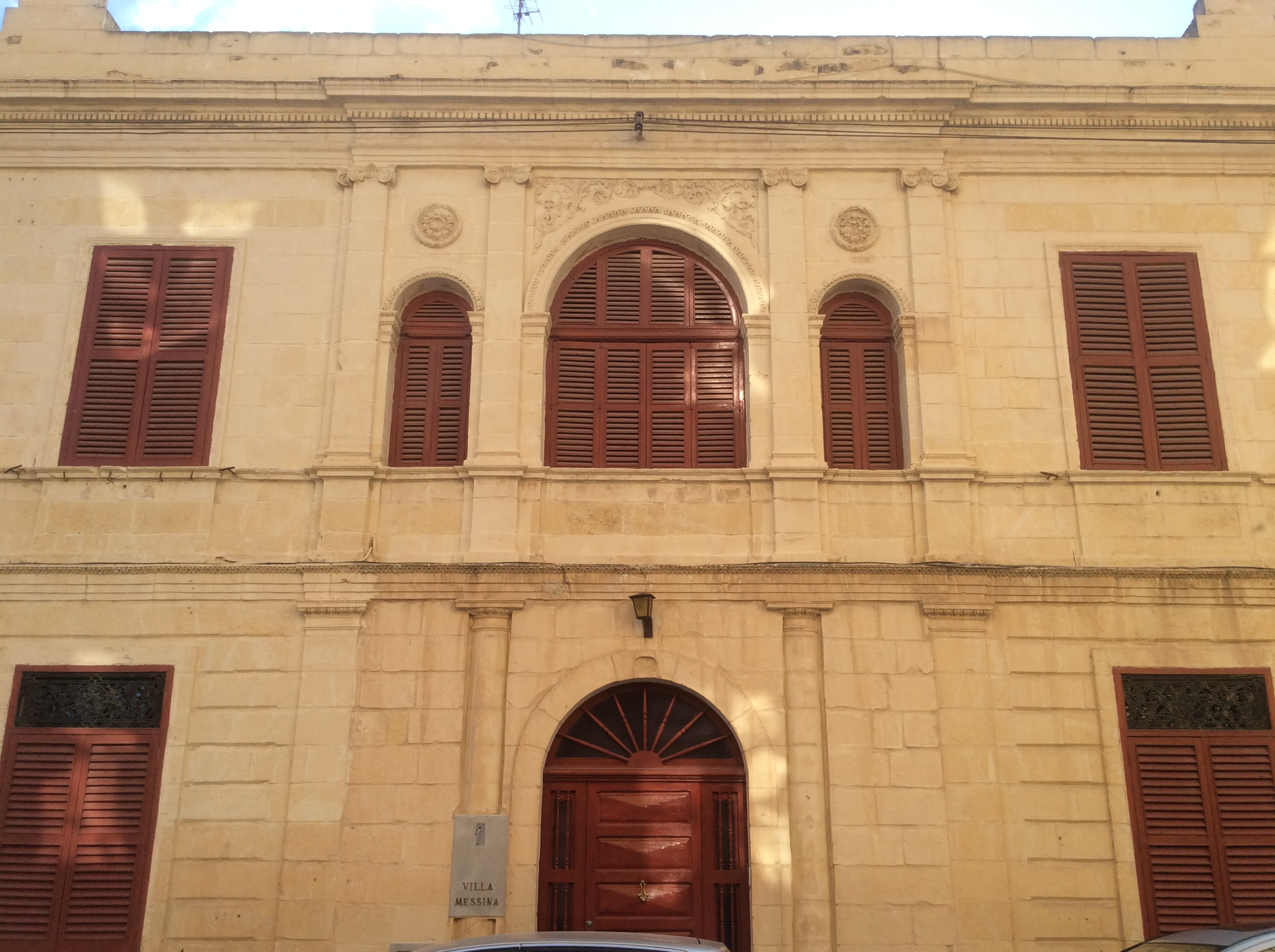
Villa Messina near St. Luke's Hospital, Malta

Villa Guardamangia, at Gwardamanġa, is a large two-storey building, best known for its elaborate porch which is reached by a flight of steps from each side. The first has a convex configuration over which is a wide elliptical arch. Scroll corbels support the lintels of the sides, while a square-headed doorway is set in an elliptical arched recess. On top of the porch are a series of segmentally arched, louvred windows. Other features include semi-circular wrought-iron balconies on each side of the porch, louvred windows and a 'remissa' doorway. The façade lacks decoration, apart from a balustraded parapet wall.

The villa was leased by Lord Louis Mountbatten around 1929. At various times between 1946 and 1953, Queen Elizabeth II stayed at the villa as both Princess and then Queen while her fiancé, and later husband, The Duke of Edinburgh was stationed in Malta as a serving Royal Navy officer. Philip and Elizabeth lived in Malta for a period between 1949 and 1951, which made Malta the only foreign country in which the Queen ever resided. It has been speculated that her son Charles was conceived here. The Queen re-visited the villa during her state visit to Malta in 1992.

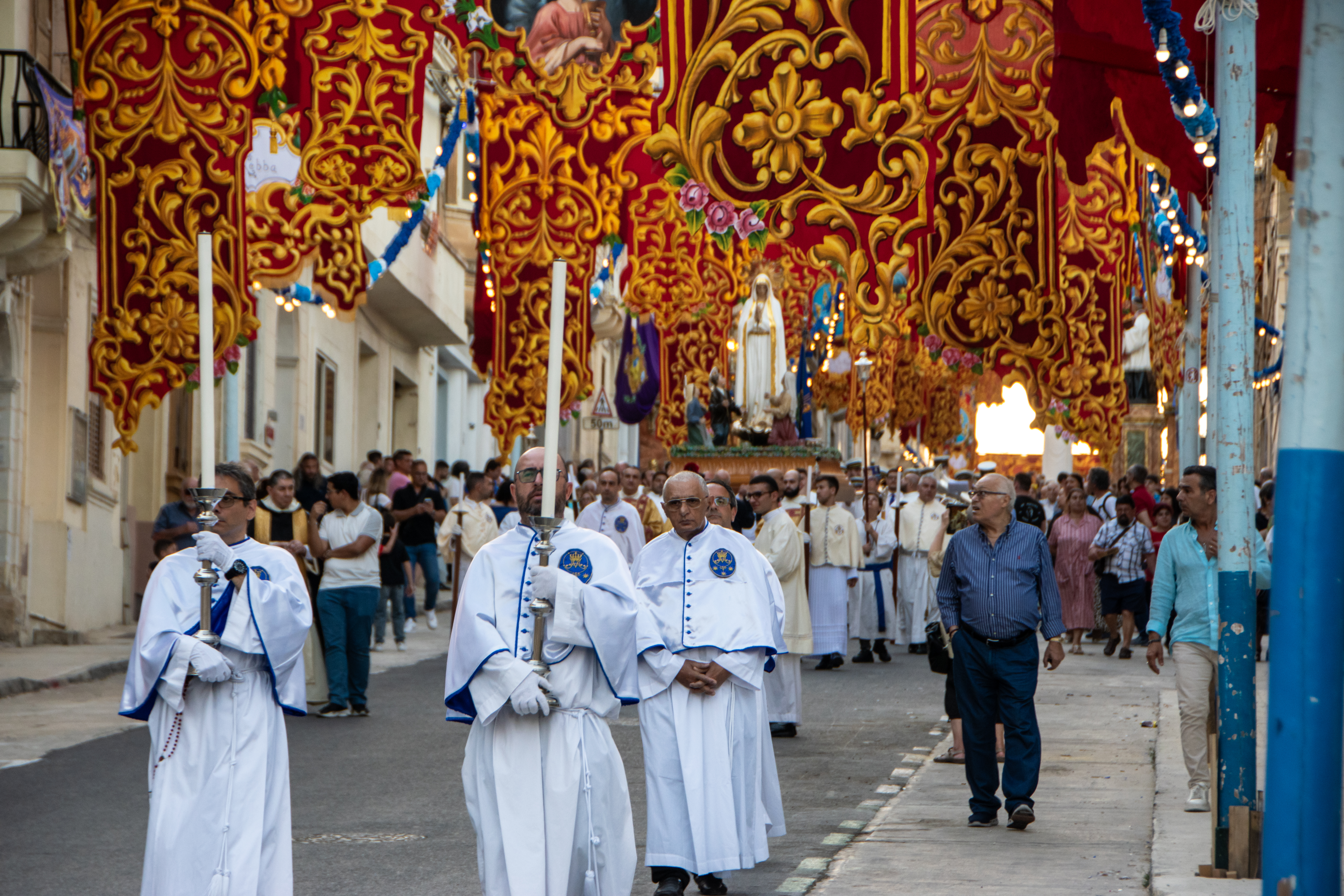

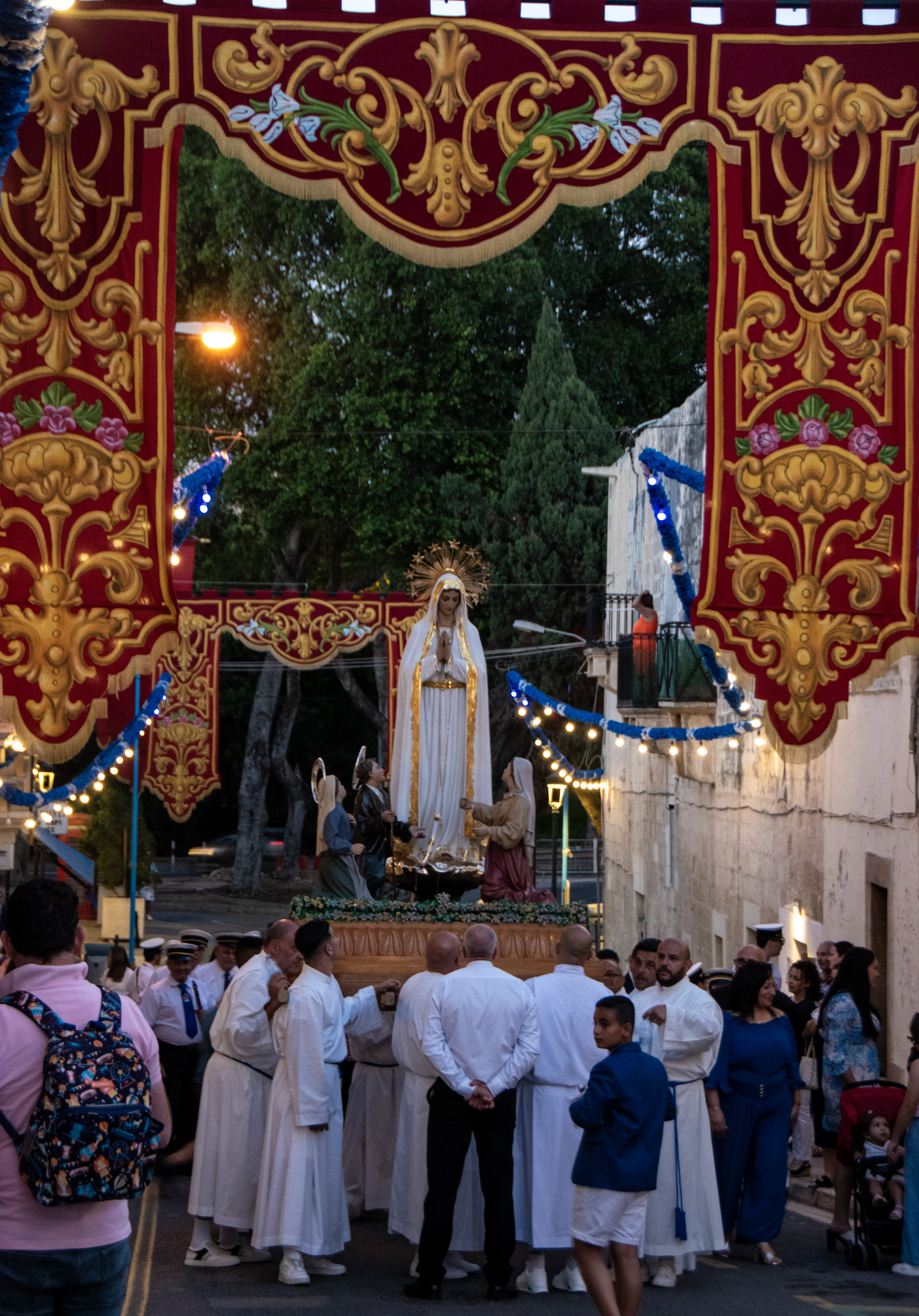
Procession of Our Lady of Fátima, June 1, 2025

A statue of Our Lady of Fátima is carried in procession through the streets of Gwardamanġa, accompanied by fireworks, as part of the Festa of Our Lady of Fátima, held annually in early June.

== Sources ==
- "Towns and Villages in Malta and Gozo: Tal-Pietà". Archived from the original on May 31, 2009.
- "Scheduled Property - Gwardamanġa". MEPA. Archived from the original on September 27, 2007.
- "Melbourne Argus 1950".
- "MEPA Schedule Pieta" (PDF). Archived from the original (PDF) on 2015-11-26.
