= Goldene Stimmgabel =

German music award

The Goldene Stimmgabel (English: Golden Tuning Fork) was an annual prize awarded within the German music scene from 1981 to 2007.

The prizes were awarded according to the number of records sold from October of the previous year to June of the year of the award, as determined by Media Control. It was established in 1981 by Dieter Thomas Heck, who hosted the television gala award show every year since then. It was broadcast on either ARD or ZDF until the year 2000. From 2001 to 2007 the award show was broadcast by ZDF alone.

In 2008, ZDF decided not to present the award and did not announce whether they would be resumed later, discontinued, or replaced with another award. The award has not been held since (as of October 2019).

== Winners ==
=== 1980s ===
- 1981 Roy Black, Howard Carpendale, Bernd Clüver, Costa Cordalis, Jürgen Drews, Gitte Hænning, Michael Holm, Roland Kaiser, Jürgen Marcus, Paola, Chris Roberts, Ireen Sheer
- 1982 Rex Gildo, Gitte Hænning, Karel Gott, Hanne Haller, Ted Herold, Andrea Jürgens, Roland Kaiser, Paola, Lena Valaitis, Nicole, Christian Franke, Werner Böhm
- 1983 Boney M., Andy Borg, Dschinghis Khan, Katja Ebstein, Gitte Hænning, Michael Holm, Andrea Jürgens, Roland Kaiser, Tony Marshall, Nicole, Paola, Frank Farian, Peter Schilling
- 1984 Nino de Angelo, Roy Black, Howard Carpendale, Drafi Deutscher, Karel Gott, Bata Illic, Angelika Milster, Nicki, Chris Roberts, Tommy Steiner, Bert Kaempfert, Freddy Quinn, Udo Jürgens
- 1985 Bläck Fööss, Bernd Clüver, Bata Illic, Jürgen Marcus, Paso Doble, Relax, Chris Roberts, Heike Schäfer, Juliane Werding, Wind, Dieter Bohlen, Ralph Siegel, Tanja Jonak
- 1986 Howard Carpendale, Costa Cordalis, EAV, Udo Jürgens, Dietmar Kindler, Klaus & Klaus, Heinz Rudolf Kunze, Münchener Freiheit, Paola, Mireille Mathieu, Roger Whittaker, Stefanie & Kim
- 1987 Howard Carpendale, Clowns & Helden, Drafi Deutscher, Michael Hoffmann, Roland Kaiser, Münchener Freiheit, Nicki, Nicole, Juliane Werding, Teddy Parker, Christian Bruhn, Michael Larsen, Thomas & Thomas
- 1988 Nino de Angelo, Cindy Berger, Werner Buttstädt, Die Flippers, EAV, Fux, Ted Herold, Michael Holm, Bruce Low, Hans-Joachim Müller Vondey, Nicki, Drafi Deutscher, Heinz Gietz, Kurt Feltz, Caterina Valente, Frank Pavell
- 1989 Roy Black, Tony Marshall, Merlin, Rainhard Fendrich, Naabtal Duo, Gitte Hænning, Nicki, Hanne Haller, Vico Torriani, Klaus & Klaus, Gerhard Wendland, Franz Grothe

=== 1990s ===
- 1990 Olaf Berger, Roy Black, Bata Illic, Peter Kraus, Münchener Freiheit, Milva, Nena, Nicole, Peter Richter, Matthias Reim, Fred Jay, Naabtal Duo, Wildecker Herzbuben
- 1991 Bernd Clüver, Nino de Angelo, Die Flippers, Heino, James Last, Manuela, Patrick Lindner, Tony Marshall, Matthias Reim, Edward Simoni, Virch Band, Juliane Werding, Wildecker Herzbuben, Michael Jary
- 1992 G. G. Anderson, Udo Jürgens, Mario Jordan, René Kollo, Patrick Lindner, Manuela, Münchener Freiheit, Angelika Milster, Nicole, Matthias Reim, Die Schäfer, Valerie's Garten, Jack White, Helmut Zacharias
- 1993 G. G. Anderson, Bernhard Brink, Brunner & Brunner, Rex Gildo, Udo Lindenberg, Patrick Lindner, Peggy March, Nicole, Die Prinzen, Pur, Wiebke Schröder, Ireen Sheer, Juliane Werding, Angela Wiedl, Bernd Meinunger, Robert Stolz
- 1994 Tom Astor, Kristina Bach, Brunner & Brunner, Die Flippers, Rex Gildo, Ricky King, Lucilectric, Nena, Heike Neumeyer, Pur, Willi Seitz, Angela Wiedl, Hans Bradte
- 1995 Brunner & Brunner, Die Doofen, Die Flippers, Karel Gott, Susanne Grawe, Michael Holm, Claudia Jung, Ernst Mosch, Mühlenhof Musikanten, Pur, Stefan Raab, Willi Seitz, Pe Werner, Rolf Zuckowski, Peter Kreuder
- 1996 Ines Adler, Brunner & Brunner, Die Jungen Klostertaler, Kastelruther Spatzen, Fool's Garden, Claudia Jung, Wencke Myhre, Nicole, Die Flippers, Wolfgang Petry, Pur, Freddy Quinn, Truck Stop, Gerhard Winkler
- 1997 Blümchen, Kim Fisher, Hanne Haller, Kastelruther Spatzen, Stefanie Hertel, Dieter Thomas Kuhn, Eberhard Hertel, Claudia Jung, Patrick Lindner, Jonny Hill, Marianne & Michael, Hansi Hinterseer, Wolfgang Petry, Michael Holm, Tic Tac Toe, Udo Lindenberg, Will Meisel
- 1998 Brunner & Brunner, Die Paldauer, Oswald Sattler, Die Flippers, Hansi Hinterseer, Vivian Lindt, Truck Stop, Nicole, Stefanie Hertel, Guildo Horn & die Orthopädischen Strümpfe, Claudia Jung, Wolfgang Petry, Die Prinzen, Pur, André Rieu, Rosenstolz, Juliane Werding, Heino
- 1999 Ralf Arnie, Brunner & Brunner, Die Flippers, Rex Gildo, Katharina Herz & Torsten Benkenstein, Hansi Hinterseer, Kastelruther Spatzen, Heinz Rudolf Kunze, Patrick Lindner, Tony Marshall, Michelle, Nicole, Anja Odenthal, Oli.P, Wolfgang Petry, Schürzenjäger

=== 2000s ===
- 2000 Anton feat. DJ Ötzi, Brunner & Brunner, Die Flippers, Echt, Claudia Christina, Judith und Mel, Die Paldauer, Jantje Smit, Laura, Vicky Leandros, Nicole, Wolfgang Petry, Rosenstolz, James Last
- 2001 Michelle, Wolfgang Petry, Helmut Lotti, Udo Jürgens, Hevia, Pur, Söhne Mannheims, Ayman, Band Ohne Namen, Judith & Mel, Jantje Smit, Nicole, Rosenstolz, Brunner & Brunner
- 2002 Andrea Berg, Wolfgang Petry, Xavier Naidoo, Nena, Die Flippers, Laith Al-Deen, E Nomine, Samajona, Oswald Sattler, Claudia Jung, Hansi Hinterseer, Brunner & Brunner, Jail Babes, Nena, Michael Kunze, Sylvester Levay
- 2003 Andrea Berg, Wolfgang Petry, Hansi Hinterseer, Geschwister Hofmann, Rosenstolz, Band ohne Namen, Die Flippers, Kastelruther Spatzen, André Rieu, Yvonne Catterfeld, Ben, Beatbetrieb, Uwe Busse
- 2004 Andrea Berg (female individual schlager), Matthias Reim (male individual schlager), Die Flippers (schlager group), Rosenstolz (duo German pop), De Randfichten (folk music), BAP (group German rock/progressive), MIA. (shooting star female group), Overground (shooting star male group), Stefan Gwildis (shooting star male individual), Pur (pop group), Brunner & Brunner (audience prize), Tom Albrecht (young artists), Gitte Hænning, Wencke Myhre & Siw (special platinum prize)
- 2005 Höhner (schlager group), Geschwister Hofmann (duo schlager), Andrea Berg (female individual schlager), Wolfgang Petry (male individual schlager), De Randfichten (folk music), Stefanie Hertel (female individual folk music), Hansi Hinterseer (male individual folk music), Söhne Mannheims (pop group), Ich + Ich (pop duo), 2raumwohnung (German pop duo), Annett Louisan (female individual pop), Max Mutzke (male individual pop), André Rieu (individual instrumental pop), Margot Eskens (Platinum Lifetime Award), Peter Maffay (Platinum Award)
- 2006 Andrea Berg (female individual schlager), Semino Rossi (male individual schlager), Annett Louisan (female individual pop), Xavier Naidoo (male individual pop), Tokio Hotel (pop group and shooting star); Rosenstolz (pop duo), Hansi Hinterseer (male individual folk music), Monika Martin (female individual folk music), Christina Stürmer (female individual German pop), Erste Allgemeine Verunsicherung (German pop group), Götz Alsmann (individual jazz), Truck Stop (country group), Mamma Mia! (musical), Wolfgang Petry (Platinum Lifetime Award), Roger Whittaker (Platinum Lifetime Award)
- 2007 Andrea Berg (female individual schlager), Roger Cicero (individual jazz), Hansi Hinterseer (individual folk music), Höhner (schlager group), Kastelruther Spatzen (folk music group), Heinz Rudolf Kunze (individual pop), LaFee (shooting star), Pur (German pop group), Semino Rossi (male individual schlager), Silbermond (pop group), Tokio Hotel (international rock group), Nana Mouskouri (Platinum Lifetime Award), Rolf Zuckowski (Platinum Lifetime Award)
