= Prendre un enfant =

Single by Yves Duteil
- Language: French
- Released: 1978
- Label: Pathé Marconi EMI
- Songwriter(s): Yves Duteil

Music video
- "Prendre un enfant" (French TV, 1979) on YouTube

"Prendre un enfant" is a song by Yves Duteil from his 1977 album Yves Duteil. In 1978 he released it as a single.

It is one of his most famous songs.

== Background and writing ==
The song was written and composed by Yves Duteil himself.

== Track listings ==
7" single Pathé-Marconi-EMI 2C 008 - 14.607

A. "Prendre un enfant (à Martine)" (4:17)
B. "Vole à tire d'ailes, nage à tire d'eau" (2:05)

== Cover versions ==
The song has been adapted into several languages, not all of them keeping the original meaning.

It has been recorded, among others, by Monika Martin (in German under the title "Gib einem Kind deine Hand"), Benny Neyman (in Dutch as "Ode aan Maastricht"), Nana Mouskouri (both in French and in German), Kids United with Claudio Capéo, Paul Roelandt (in Dutch under the title "Neem eens een kind bij de hand"), Monika Martin with Yvann (in German), Stefanie Hertel (in German), Peter Reber & Nina, André Rieu (in a multilanguage version as "Ode to Maastricht"), Vox Angeli, Joan Baez, and Miriam Makeba.
