= Star Gala =

Star Gala may refer to

== Compilation albums ==
- Star Gala Connie Francis 1998
- Star Gala Roger Whittaker 1996
- Star Gala Die Paldauer 1998
- Star Gala Brunner & Brunner 1996
- Star Gala Hanne Haller 1998
- Star Gala (Baccara album)
- Star Gala France Gall
- Star Gala Frank Zander 1998
- Star Gala Hans Hartz
- Star Gala Freddy Quinn
- Star Gala Udo Lindenberg
- Star Gala Barry Ryan
- Star Gala Demis Roussos
