= Alexandra (singer) =

German singer (1942–1969)

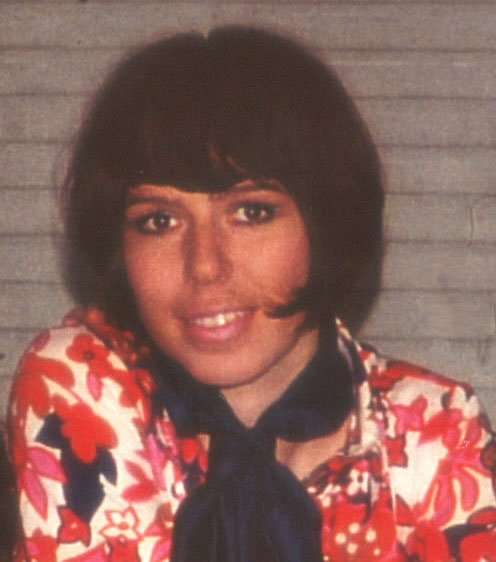
- Alexandra in 1969

Background information
- Born: Doris Treitz; 19 May 1942; Heydekrug, East Prussia, Germany
- Died: 31 July 1969 (aged 27) Tellingstedt, Germany
- Occupation: Singer
- Instrument: Vocals

Doris Nefedov (née Treitz, 19 May 1942 – 31 July 1969), better known by her stage name Alexandra, was a German singer.

== Biography ==
Doris Treitz was born in Heydekrug, Memelland (today: Šilutė, Lithuania). Due to the flight and expulsion of Germans during and after WWII, her mother had to take her and her two elder sisters to the West. While the father wanted his daughters to aim for office jobs, the mother supported artistic aspirations, and the interest in foreign languages. At age 17, she left school in Kiel to become a fashion designer and actor in Hamburg, studying at Margot-Höpfner-Schauspielschule, working in several jobs to earn the money. At age 19, Doris Treitz took part in the Miss Germany pageant, enjoying being in the spotlight while still living with her mother in a small cheap apartment in Hamburg's Rothenburgsort. In order to pay the rent, they had to lease a room to a Russian, Nikolai Nefedov, who was 49 years old and en route to emigration into the US. Doris fell in love, and they married. After their boy Alexander ("Sascha") was born when she was 20, the couple got a divorce and Nefedov went to America alone.

As she did not consider her legal name Doris Nefedov as helpful to a career, she chose Alexandra instead, after her son. Before a concert of singer Salvatore Adamo, the crowd booed other new female talents away, until Alexandra won them over with her rather melancholic style. Hans R. Beierlein, the well known German music manager of Udo Jürgens, became her manager, friend and lover.

Alexandra's first hit single, Zigeunerjunge ("Gypsy boy"), was released in 1967, taken from her first successful debut longplay album Premiere mit Alexandra ("Premiere with Alexandra"). She wrote the half of the tracks released on her second album Alexandra, which had mixed receptions from music critics, according to producer Fred Weyrich because the songs "were ahead of their time". Regrettably her record label refused the release of a single to promote the LP. The album track Mein Freund, der Baum ("My friend, the tree") only became a classic after her death.

Alexandra was forced to record Sehnsucht ("Yearning"), a song not written by herself, and vowed not to sing it again. Ironically it became her highest charting single reaching number 12 in the German charts.

More single releases followed, including Illusionen ("Illusions"), Schwarze Balalaika ("Black balalaika") - from her third album Sehnsucht-Ein Portrait in Musik - and Erstes Morgenrot ("First red sunrise"). The latter was released just three weeks before her death, reached number seventeen in the German Charts and appeared on the posthumous album Ihre grossen Erfolge. Illusionen would then be translated to English and rewritten by Don Black and Udo Jürgens, in the west it became known as "If I Never Sing Another Song".

In her international career, she performed songs in several other languages besides German as well, including French, English, Russian and Hebrew. In 1968, she performed in Rio de Janeiro, and spent a holiday there, meeting a new lover. In spring of 1969, she was awarded the Golden Europa award for best newcomer. Soon, she had to take a time-out in Davos due to the stress of her career which soon resumed after a move to Munich. She met Pierre Lafaire, and they intended to marry even though her sisters disagreed, suspecting fraud. They split up. Following phone calls, she slept in the same room with her son fearing that her son might get abducted, and wrote her last will in favour of her son and mother.

== Death ==
On 31 July 1969, Alexandra traveled to Hamburg to negotiate with her record company. She took a car shuttle train. The same day, on her way to a holiday on Sylt, Alexandra drove her recently acquired Mercedes-Benz 220 SE Coupé with her son, Alexander, and her mother. On the way, she had the car checked in a workshop. Leaving the shop, the car failed to stop at an intersection, colliding with a truck near the town of Tellingstedt, Holstein, under unexplained circumstances. Alexandra was killed instantly, while Alexander survived with minor injuries. Alexandra was just 27 years old when she died. The fact she was a musician combined with her age at the time of her death means she is a member of the 27 Club. Alexandra's mother died later in the hospital. The car may have had mechanical issues.

With 3,000 people attending, Alexandra was buried at the Westfriedhof in Munich: her tombstone is simply labelled "Alexandra".

A biography was published in 1999 by movie director Marc Boettcher; Boettcher received several anonymous threats while researching the circumstances of Alexandra's death, and announced that he would push for a new investigation of the circumstances of her death in 2004 after further research, citing former Stasi documents that revealed that her lover Pierre Lafaire had been an American secret agent in Denmark as well as testimonies contradicting the documented results of the original investigation.

== Songs (selection) ==
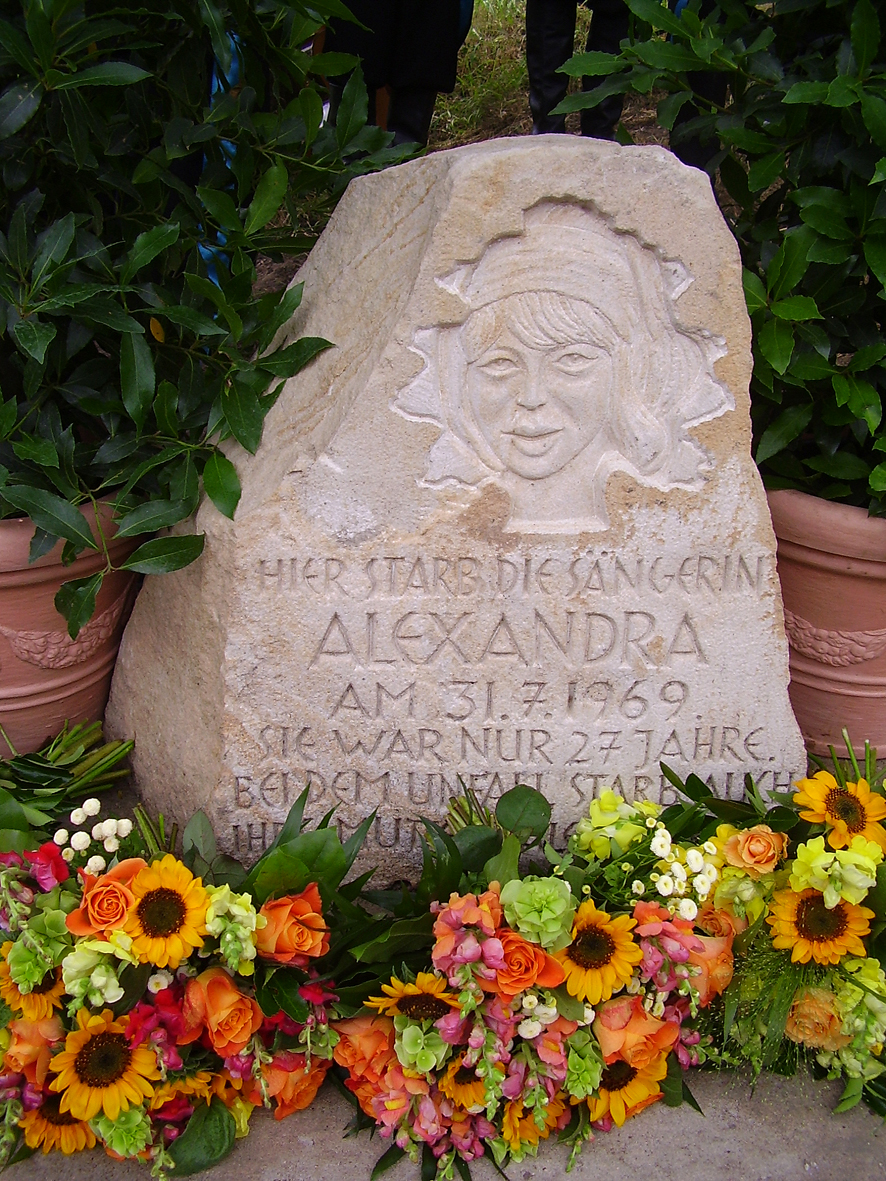
Memorial at the crash site in Tellingstedt

- Erstes Morgenrot
- Zigeunerjunge (Tzigane)
- Sehnsucht (Das Lied der Taiga)
- Illusionen (If I Never Sing Another Song)
- Grau zieht der Nebel (Tombe la Neige)
- Was ist das Ziel?
- Die anderen waren schuld
- Those were the days
- Ja lubljú tebjá
- Der Traum vom Fliegen
- Im sechsten Stock
- Accordéon (franz)
- Mein Freund, der Baum
- Schwarze Balalaika
- Auf dem Wege nach Odessa
- Alles geht vorüber
- Das Glück kam zu mir wie ein Traum
- Am großen Strom
- Kleine Anuschka
- Wenn die letzten lila Astern blühn
- Es war einmal ein Fischer
- Duscha, Duscha
- La taiga (franz)
- Was sind wir Menschen doch für Leute
- Schwarze Engel
