= Patrick Lindner =

German Volksmusik singer (born 1960)

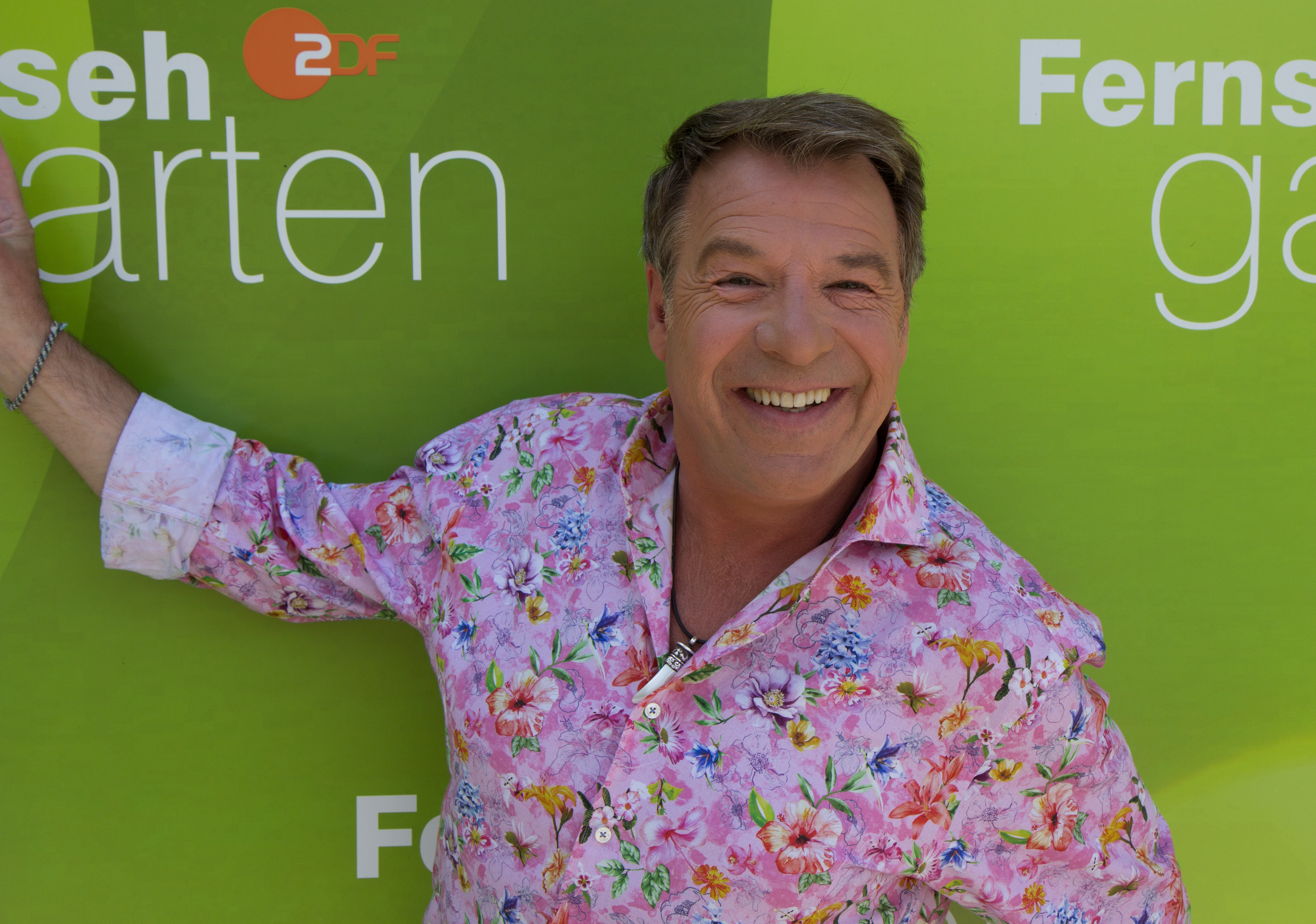
- Lindner in 2018

Background information
- Born: Friedrich Günther Raab; 27 September 1960 (age 66); Munich, West Germany
- Genre: Volksmusik
- Occupation: Singer
- Instrument: Vocals
- Years active: 1989–present

Patrick Lindner (born 27 September 1960) is a German Volksmusik singer.

== Life ==
Born as Friedrich Günther Raab in Munich, West Germany, Lindner worked as a chef before his breakthrough in 1989 when he was second in the Grand Prix der Volksmusik. He then released various singles and albums and hosted TV shows such as "Patrick Lindner persönlich" ("Patrick Lindner Personally"), "So ein Tag mit guten Freunden" ("A Day with Good Friends"), and the "Patrick Lindner Show" on ZDF (until 1998). He also had appearances in movies and series as "Weißblaue Wintergeschichten" ("Wintertime Stories"), "Das Traumschiff", and "SOKO München".

By 1997, Lindner abandoned classical Volksmusik to make more progressive music. By this time, his coming out and his relationship with manager Michael Link made him popular in Germany – newspapers called them a "Germany's top gay couple". They adopted eight-month-old Daniel, a child brought up in an institution in Russia. Link wrote the children's books "Come I'll show you my parents" and "Adventure Adoption or: a lifetime dream comes true" in order to promote tolerance towards homosexuals. The couple broke up in March 2005. Lindner married his partner (since 2010) Peter Schäfer in 2020.

== Awards ==
- Bambi 1991
- Goldene Stimmgabel 1991, 1992, 1993, 1997 and 1999

== Discography ==
- Die kloane Tür zum Paradies (1989)
- Die kleinen Dinge des Lebens (1990)
- Weihnachten mit Patrick Lindner (1990)
- Eine Handvoll Herzlichkeit (1991)
- Ohne Zärtlichkeit geht gar nix (1992)
- Träum Dich ins Paradies – meine 18 schönsten Lieder (1993)
- Liebe ist das Salz der Erde (1994)
- Meine Lieder streicheln Dich (1995)
- Weihnachtszeit – Stille Zeit (1995)
- Herzlich willkommen in meinem Leben (1996)
- Das Beste aus der Patrick Lindner Show (1997)
- Himmelweit (1998)
- Stark genug (1999)
- Wenn es noch Wunder gibt (2000)
- Mammamia (2001)
- Nur das Beste (2002)
- Halleluja – auf das Leben (2003)
- Ganz privat – meine schönsten Liebeslieder (2004)
- Gigolo (2005)
- Die Sonne ist für alle da (2006)
- Heute, hier und jetzt (2007)
- Jedes Herz braucht eine Heimat (2008)
- Fang dir die Sonne (2009)
- Schenk dir den Tag (2010)
- Böhmisch klingt's am Besten (2012)
- Nur mit deiner Liebe (2014)
- Mittenrein ins Glück (2016)
- Leb dein Leben (2018)
