= G. G. Anderson =

German singer and composer (born 1949)

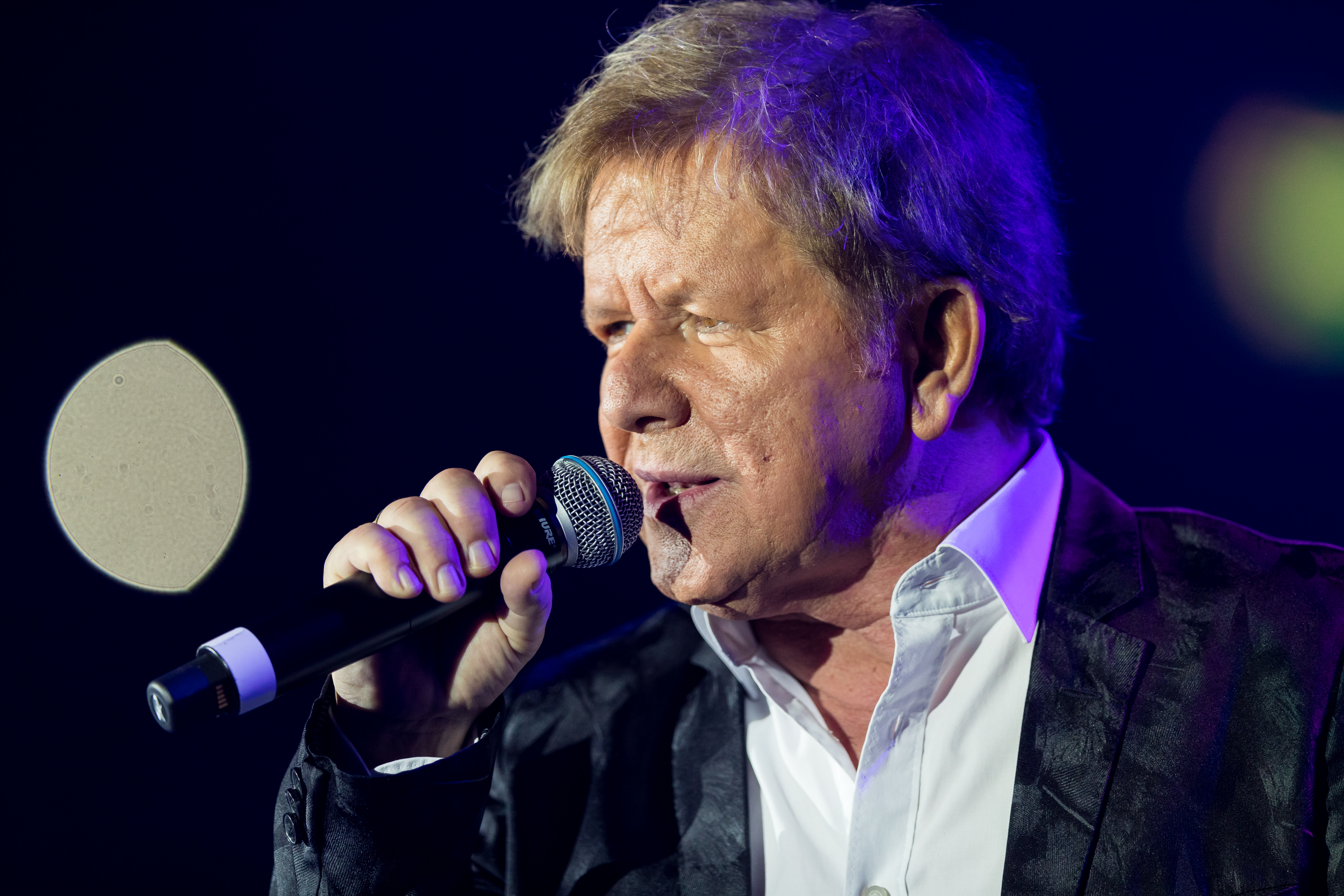
- Anderson in 2017
- Born: Gerd Günther Grabowski; 4 December 1949 (age 76); Eschwege, Hesse, Allied Occupied Germany
- Occupations: Schlager singer, composer, music producer
- Spouse: Monika
- Children: 2
- Website: www.g-g-anderson.de

Gerd Günther Grabowski (born 4 December 1949), better known by his stage name G. G. Anderson, is a German Schlager singer, composer, and music producer.

== Life and career ==
Gerd Grabowski was born on 4 December 1949 in Eschwege, Hesse, Germany.

After completing his apprenticeship, he became an electrician, while composing, arranging, and singing. His musical career began at age 15 in 1964 as a member of "The Rackets", a band emulating The Beatles, in 1968 he sang with the Blue Moons at the Burg Herzberg Festival, and from 1970 to 1972 in the band "Love and Tears" (Michael Holm's backing group). In 1973 he became a solo artist under the name "Alexander Marco", from 1977 to 1979 as "Tony Bell" and since 1980 has performed under the name "G. G. Anderson".

His success as a singer began in 1981. His most famous titles are "Mama Lorraine", which reached Number 10 on the German charts, "African Baby", "Am weißen Strand von San Angelo", "Nein heißt Ja", "Sommernacht in Rom", "Sommer, Sonne, Cabrio", "Rosalie", "Mädchen, Mädchen", "Wenn Tirol am Nordpol wär" and "Weiße Rosen schenk' ich Dir". In 1988, he was fourth in the German preliminary decision for the Eurovision Song Contest with the song "Hättest Du heut’ Zeit für mich?". The folk music duo Wildecker Herzbuben emerged from his backing group, for which Anderson also composed hit titles. He celebrated his 60th birthday in 2009 with a gala concert, Das große Wunschkonzert spezial, televised by NDR.

He has composed for a number of singers, including "The Spanish Night is Over", a hit for Engelbert Humperdinck.

Anderson has been an honorary citizen of the city of Eschwege since July 1997. Among his other awards are Belgischer Rundfunk's Goldene Antenne (1992), the Goldene Stimmgabel, and seven ZDF-Hitparade wins.

== Personal life ==
Anderson married his second wife, Monika, in 1987. He has two children; his son Philipp is mentally disabled and autistic.

== Discography ==
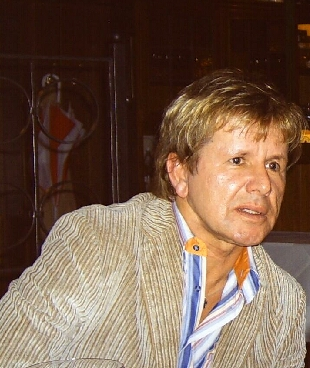
G. G. Anderson in 2005

=== Albums ===
- Always and Ever (1981)
- Lass uns träumen (1984)
- Was ich Dir sagen möchte (1985)
- Ich glaube an die Zärtlichkeit (1986)
- Vergiss die Liebe nicht (1987)
- Träume einer Sommernacht – Seine größten Erfolge (1988)
- Herzklopfen (1988)
- Traumreise für zwei (1989)
- Heut' geht's uns gut (so soll es bleiben) (1990)
- Weiße Rosen schenk' ich Dir (1992)
- Von Anfang an (1993)
- Ich lieb' Dich (1995)
- G.G. Anderson '98 (1998)
- Eine Nacht, die nie vergeht (1999)
- Nein heißt ja (2000)
- Feuer & Flamme (2001)
- Dafür leb' ich – Das Allerbeste (2002)
- Herz auf rot (2003)
- Einmal hüh – einmal hott (2004)
- Für Dich (2005)
- Zeit zum Träumen (2006)
- Lebenslust (2007)
- Zwei Herzen im Schnee – Meine schönsten Lieder zur Weihnachtszeit (2007)
- Besser geht nicht (2010)
- Lena – Seine großen Erfolge (2013)

=== Singles ===
- Kleines Lied vom Sonnenschein (1973, come Alexander Marco)
- Nichts ist schlimmer als ein Leben ohne Frau'n (1979, come Tony Bell)
- Always and Ever (1980)
- African Baby (1980)
- Mama Lorraine (1981)
- Cheerio (1981)
- Jim And Andy (1982)
- When Your Heart Is Cryin' (1982)
- I'm Alive (1983)
- Memories Of Lucia (1983)
- San Fernando (1983)
- Hungriges Herz (1984)
- Am weißen Strand von San Angelo (1984)
- Santa Lucia – versunken im Meer (1985)
- Sommernacht in Rom (1985)
- Und dann nehm' ich Dich in meine Arme (1985)
- Ti amo Maria (1986)
- Die Sonne von St. Helena (1986)
- Mädchen, Mädchen (1986)
- Ich glaube an die Zärtlichkeit (1986)
- Hallo Du (1987)
- Unser Himmelbett war nur der Strand (1987)
- Jamaica (1987)
- S.O.S. mein Herz ertrinkt (1988)
- Hättest Du heut' Zeit für mich (1988)
- Liebe ist ... (1988)
- Little Darling (1988)
- Sommer – Sonne – Cabrio (1989)
- Goodbye, My Love, Goodbye (1989)
- Lady Sunshine (1989)
- Auf einer Wolke ... (1990)
- Heut' geht's uns gut (so soll es bleiben) (1990)
- Engel von Valparaiso (1991)
- Sonnenschein im Blut (1991)
- Ich bin so treu wie Gold (1991)
- Rosalie (1992)
- Weiße Rosen schenk' ich Dir (1992)
- Husch, husch ins Körbchen (1992)
- Wir sind auf der Erde, um glücklich zu sein (1993)
- Ich bin verliebt in Dich (1994)
- Memories Of Love (1994)
- Ich lieb' Dich jeden Tag ein bisschen mehr (1995)
- Komm mit mir im Frühling nach Venedig (1995)
- Lass uns nie mehr auseinandergeh'n (1995)
- Geh, wenn Du willst (1996)
- Gib mein Herz zurück (1997)
- Immer nur Du (1998)
- Ich weiß, ich lieb' Dich (1998 – Promo)
- Der Sommer ist vorbei (1998)
- Und wenn Tirol am Nordpol wär' (1999)
- Eine Nacht, die nie vergeht (1999)
- Und wenn Du morgen gehst (Jeanie) (2000)
- Nein heißt ja (2000)
- Die Liebe, die durch's Feuer geht (2000)
- La Vita E Bella (2001)
- Willst Du mich küssen (2001)
- Und dann nehm' ich Dich in meine Arme (Neuaufnahme) (2001)
- Hey Du da (2002)
- Dafür leb' ich (ein Wahnsinn) (2002)
- Herz auf rot (2003 – Promo)
- Stern an der Playa del Sol (2003)
- Einmal hüh – einmal hott (2004)
- Du hast gesagt, es ist zu Ende (2004 – Promo)
- Wo bist Du (2005 – Promo)
- Kali Spera Griechenland (2005)
- Eine Stunde Dein Mann zu sein (2005 – Promo)
- Du bist da (Sha na na) (2005 – Promo)
- Tränen sind nicht nur zum Weinen (2006 – Promo)
- Adiole My Love (2006 – Promo)
- Küsse schmecken einfach besser (2007 – Promo)
- Hast Du Lust (2007 – Promo)
- Wir sind jung (2007 – Promo)
- Du bist mein Weihnachtsstern (2007 – Promo)
