= Golden Tuning Fork =

Golden Tuning Fork is the English translation of the titles of the following music awards:

- Diapason d'Or, France
- Goldene Stimmgabel, Germany
- Zolotoy Kamerton (Золотой камертон), Soviet Union
