= Géraldine Olivier =

Swiss singer of volkstümliche Musik (born 1967)

Géraldine Olivier (born 5 June 1967 in Neuchâtel, maiden name Burri) is a Swiss singer of volkstümliche Musik.

== Biography ==
Géraldine Olivier grew up in Marly, Fribourg and sang as a child in various choirs. After leaving school, she trained as a secretary. As such, she worked in the Swiss embassy in Japan. Here, at a diplomatic function of fellow countrymen, she first made contact with the professional music scene. Back in Switzerland, she worked in the Swiss parliament house in Bern.

In July 1986, she had her first stage appearance at the World Expo in Vancouver. She would have participated in the Eurovision Song Contest in 1992 with Soleil, soleil for Switzerland, but, due to a formal error by Swiss television, she was disqualified, and the Swiss would not allow their entry. In 1995 she won the Grand Prix der Volksmusik in Vienna with Nimm Dir wieder einmal Zeit written by Vreni and Rudi, which went gold in Switzerland, Austria and Germany.

The singer has since been a frequent guest on various popular television shows. In addition, she is to be found present at fashion shows and fundraisers.

A car crash in the mid-1980s injured her spine, damaging five of her cervical vertebrae, and she worked with increasing pain, which, it was thought, might endanger her career. An examination in early 2011 by the star footballer turned star orthopedist Hans-Josef "Jupp" Kapellmann was to determine the suitability of prosthetic intervention. After treatment in mid-June 2011, she reported being able to move again without pain.

Géraldine Olivier has a son from her second marriage. In July 2007 she married for the third time to Lutz Ribatis, producer and widower of Claudia Cristina. As of 2015, they and their children Gregory and Jonas-Alexander live in Schleswig-Holstein, Germany. In 2015, they founded private record label Grejo Records (named after their children).

In 2023, she announced she would be giving her last live concerts.
