= Wildecker Herzbuben =

German music group

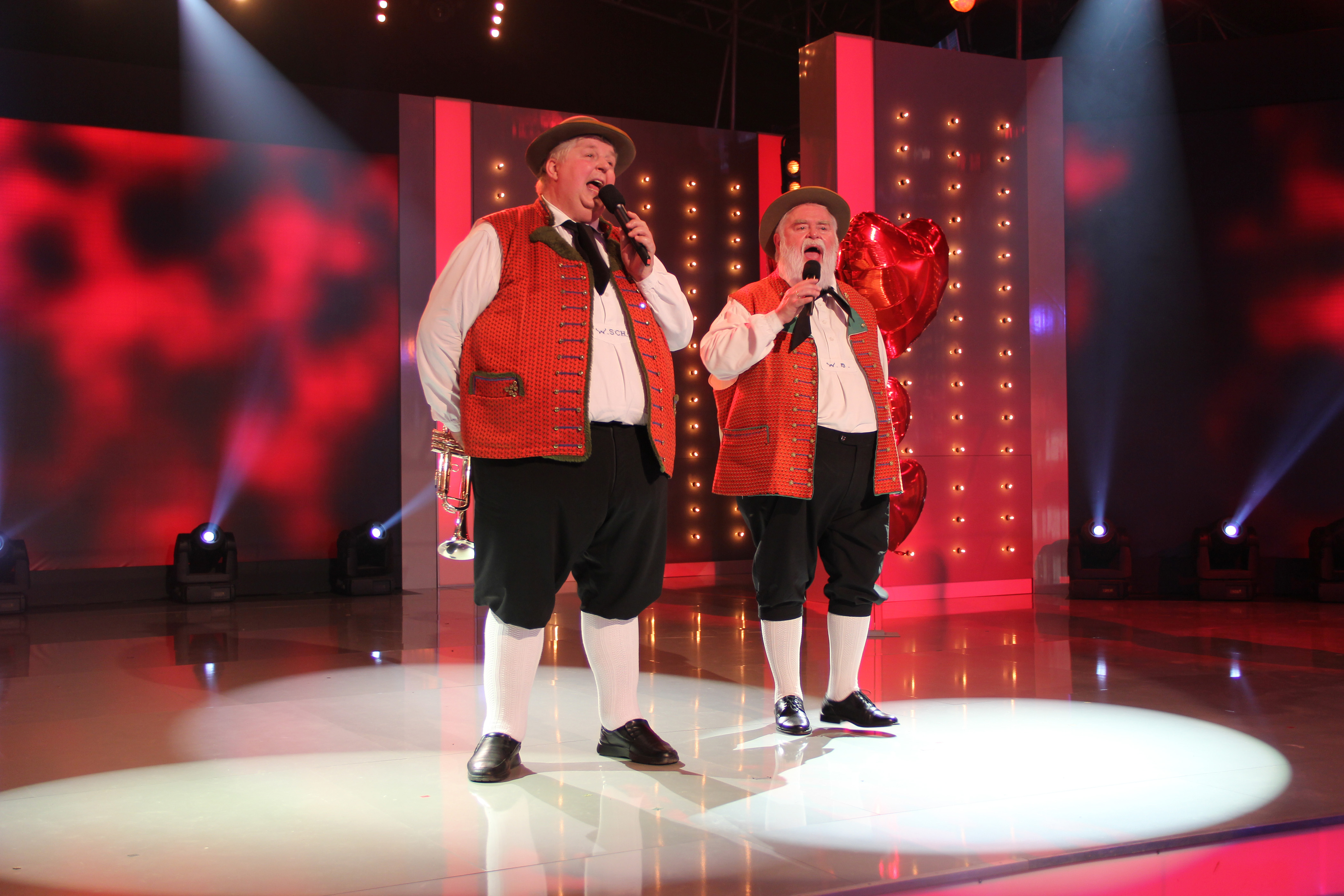
- Wildecker Herzbuben in 2013

Background information
- Origin: Wildeck, Germany
- Genres: Schlager
- Years active: 1990 – present
- Members: Wolfgang Schwalm; Wilfried Gliem
- Website: www.wildecker-herzbuben.com

Die Wildecker Herzbuben are a German music group of the Volkstümliche Musik genre, coming from Wildeck in Hesse.

== Discography ==
- 1990: Herzilein
- 1991: Zwei Kerle wie wir
- 1992: Das tut gut
- 1992: Weihnachten zu Hause
- 1993: Von Ganzem Herzen
- 1993: Ist das nicht himmlisch
- 1994: Am schönsten ist es daheim
- 1995: Kuschelzeit
- 1997: Weil wir Freunde sind
- 1997: Die ewigen Juwelen der Volksmusik
- 2000: Bubenstreiche
- 2002: Die Sonne scheint auf alle gleich
- 2003: Das Beste der Wildecker Herzbuben
- 2004: Starcollection
- 2005: So schön ist der Norden
- 2006: Rutsch an meine Seite
- 2007: Wahre Liebe
- 2009: 20 Jahre Herzilein

== Awards ==
- Goldene Stimmgabel (1990 und 1991)
- multiple Goldene Schallplatte and Platin-Schallplatte
- Doppelplatin
- RSH-Gold by radio station Radio Schleswig-Holstein
- Edelweiß by magazine Frau im Spiegel
- Wilfried Gliem achieved honorary citizenship 2004 in his hometown Wildeck
- 2012: Faustorden (a medal) of the Handwerker Carnevalsverein Weimar
