= Andrea Jürgens =

German singer

- Jürgens from a 1979 magazine

Background information
- Born: 15 May 1967; Wanne-Eickel, North Rhine-Westphalia, West Germany
- Died: 20 July 2017 (aged 50) Recklinghausen, North Rhine-Westphalia, Germany
- Genre: Schlager music
- Occupation: Singer

Andrea Jürgens (15 May 1967 – 20 July 2017) was a German schlager singer. She became famous as a child star in the late 1970s when she had her first hit with "Und dabei liebe ich euch beide" (And Yet I Love You Both) at age 10. She released over 60 singles.

== Career ==
=== Early years ===
Andrea Elisabeth Maria Jürgens was the daughter of Margret and Heinz Jürgens. She was born in Wanne-Eickel, North Rhine-Westphalia, West Germany. She performed her debut hit "Und dabei liebe ich euch beide" (And Yet I Love You Both) in her first television appearance on ARD-Silvestergala on New Year's Eve 1977. The song was written by Jack White and Jon Athan. Its lyrics address the post-divorce situation from a child's perspective. Further appearances on various television and radio shows followed.

In the March 1978 Jürgens was viewers' choice winner on ZDF-Hitparade, a television show conducted by Dieter Thomas Heck. In the fall of 1978 the follow-ups to the debut hit were released. "Ich zeige Dir mein Paradies" (I'll Show You My Paradise) and "Tina ist weg" (Tina's missing), together with her success in the so-called hit parades concluded Jürgens' position as the first big child star in Germany since Heintje. In 1979 she gained further success with "Ein Herz für Kinder" (A Heart for Children) and "Eine Rose für dich" (A Rose for You).

In October 1979 the Christmas album Weihnachten mit Andrea Jürgens was published. Its sales exceeded 1,5 million copies in just three months. Consequently, the album achieved multiple gold records and double platinum. The album included the single "Aba Heidschi Bumbeidschi", a traditional lullaby.

=== 1980s ===
Jürgens' commercial success continued in a smaller scale in the early 1980s. The folk music album Andrea Jürgens singt die schönsten deutschen Volkslieder was released in 1981. Her next single hits were "Mama Lorraine" (1981), "Japanese Boy" (1981), and "Playa Blanca" (1984). While "Manuel Goodbye" (1983) was originally sung in English by Audrey Landers, "Playa Blanca" was originally sung in English by Linda Susan Bauer and later covered by Landers. Jack White produced all of these versions of both songs.

The albums Solang’ ein Mädchen träumen kann (As Long as a Girl Can Dream) (1982) and Weil wir uns lieben (Because We Love Each Other) (1984) were not chart busters like their predecessors. In the latter half of the decade, no new studio albums were released. However, she released some singles (e.g. "Ciao ciao amore") and a "Best Of" compilation which was published in 1987.

=== 1990s and afterwards ===
Jürgens' studio albums Küsse der Nacht (Kisses of the Night) and Liebe (Love) were released in the early 1990s. The album Ich krieg' nie genug von dir (I Never Get Enough of You) was released in 1993. Once again, it included a song originally interpreted by Audrey Landers, namely "Guten Morgen Sonnenschein" (Good Morning Sunshine). In 1996 Jürgens recorded the single "Wir greifen nach den Sternen" (We Reach for the Stars) together with the Nockalm Quintett. The song was included in the album Wenn ich glücklich bin (1996), the opening track of which is the German cover version of Madonna's hit "You'll See", "Du wirst sehen".

In 2002, Jürgens celebrated her 25-year singing career. The anniversary was celebrated by publishing the jubilee album Dankeschön zum 25jährigen Bühnenjubiläum. In the new century she changed her record company from BMG to KOCH. Lust aufs Leben (Love of Life) (2005) was her first studio album under the new label. Jack White and Peter Wagner had been the producers of Jürgens' albums during her BMG-years, White often mentioned as the executive producer on the album cover. In KOCH her producer has been Alfons Weindorf.

Her early albums were published in a non-plastic CD-box in 2006 by White Records. The albums are: Ich zeige dir mein Paradies (I'll Show You My Paradise), Eine Rose schenk ich dir...und dieses Lied (I Give You a Rose ... and This Song), Irgendwann wird jedes Mädchen mal 17 (Every Girl Turns 17 Sometime), Mama Lorraine and Solang’ ein Mädchen träumen kann (As Long as a Girl Can Dream), each with original cover artwork.

Her final album Millionen von Sternen was released in March 2016, including the singles Millionen von Sternen, Das reicht für mehr als eine Nacht and Déjà vu.

She died of kidney failure on 20 July 2017, aged 50.

== Lyrics ==
The lyrics of Jürgens' songs were mainly about typical schlager themes included friendship and love. The divorce theme in her first hit "Und dabei liebe ich euch beide" (1977) was an exception. In the German schlager scene divorce was a taboo subject until the 1970s; lyrics were mainly about harmonious relationships. During the decade, divorce reforms and public discussion of the reasons and consequences of divorce changed this.

== Awards ==
Jürgens was awarded various national music prizes. She achieved many silver, gold and platinum records for her singles and albums. The album Weihnachten mit Andrea Jürgens (Christmas with Andrea Jürgens) has achieved multiple gold and platinum. It has been commercially available throughout the year since its first publication. In 1982 and 1983, Jürgens was granted the Goldene Stimmgabel (Golden Tuning Fork).

== Discography ==
=== Albums ===
Year	Album	Chart No.
1978	Ich zeige dir mein Paradies	Germany #41
1979	Eine Rose schenk ich dir	
1979	Weihnachten mit Andrea Jürgens - Meine 20 schönsten Weihnachtslieder	Germany #1, Austria #19
1980	Irgendwann wird jedes Mädchen mal 17	
1981	Andrea Jürgens singt die schönsten deutschen Volkslieder	Germany #18
1981	Mama Lorraine	
1982	Solang' ein Mädchen träumen kann	
1984	Weil wir uns lieben	
1990	Küsse der Nacht	
1992	Liebe	
1993	Ich krieg nie genug von dir	
1994	Wir tanzen Lambada	
1996	Wenn ich glücklich bin	
2000	Komm in meine Träume	
2001	Andrea Jürgens singt die schönsten deutschen Weihnachtslieder - neu produziert	
2002	Dankeschön zum 25jährigen Bühnenjubiläum	
2005	Lust aufs Leben	Germany # 97
2005	Stille Nacht heilige Nacht	
2008	Verbotene Träume	
2008	Du hast mir total gefehlt - 16 große Single-Hits	
2010	Ich hab nur ein Herz	
2016	Millionen von Sternen	Germany #10, Austria #15, Switzerland #52
2018	Auf Du und Du	Germany #6, Austria #21, Switzerland #41

=== Compilations ===
- 10 Jahre Andrea Jürgens - Die großen Erfolge (1987)
- Amore, Amore - Ihre schönsten Lovesongs (1991)
- Die Grossen Erfolge - Stargala (1996)
- Momente - Die Grössten Erfolge aus 20 Jahren (1997)
- Nur das Beste - Die Grossen Erfolge 1983–2000 (2000)
- Best of (2005)
- Die frühen Erfolge - 5 er CD Box - die ersten 5 Alben erstmals auf CD (2006)
- Das Allerbeste (2008)
- Sonderedition Vol. 1 (2012)
- Wunschkonzert (2013)
- Das Beste (2014) (D #18; A #57)
- Das Beste - DVD (2014) (A #4)
- 40 Jahre - Die Andrea Jürgens Collection (2017) (D #57)
- Das Beste – Ein Kinderstar wird 50 (2017) (D #75)
- Das Beste – Die Jubiläumsausgabe (2017) (D #31)
- Das Beste – Gedenk-Edition (2017) (D #87)
- Danke, Andrea! (2017) (D #80)

== Literature ==
- Dieter Moll: Die deutschen Schlager der 70er Jahre. Heel AG, Schindellegi (Schweiz) 1996; ISBN 3-89365-527-1
