= Précy-sur-Marne =

- Commune
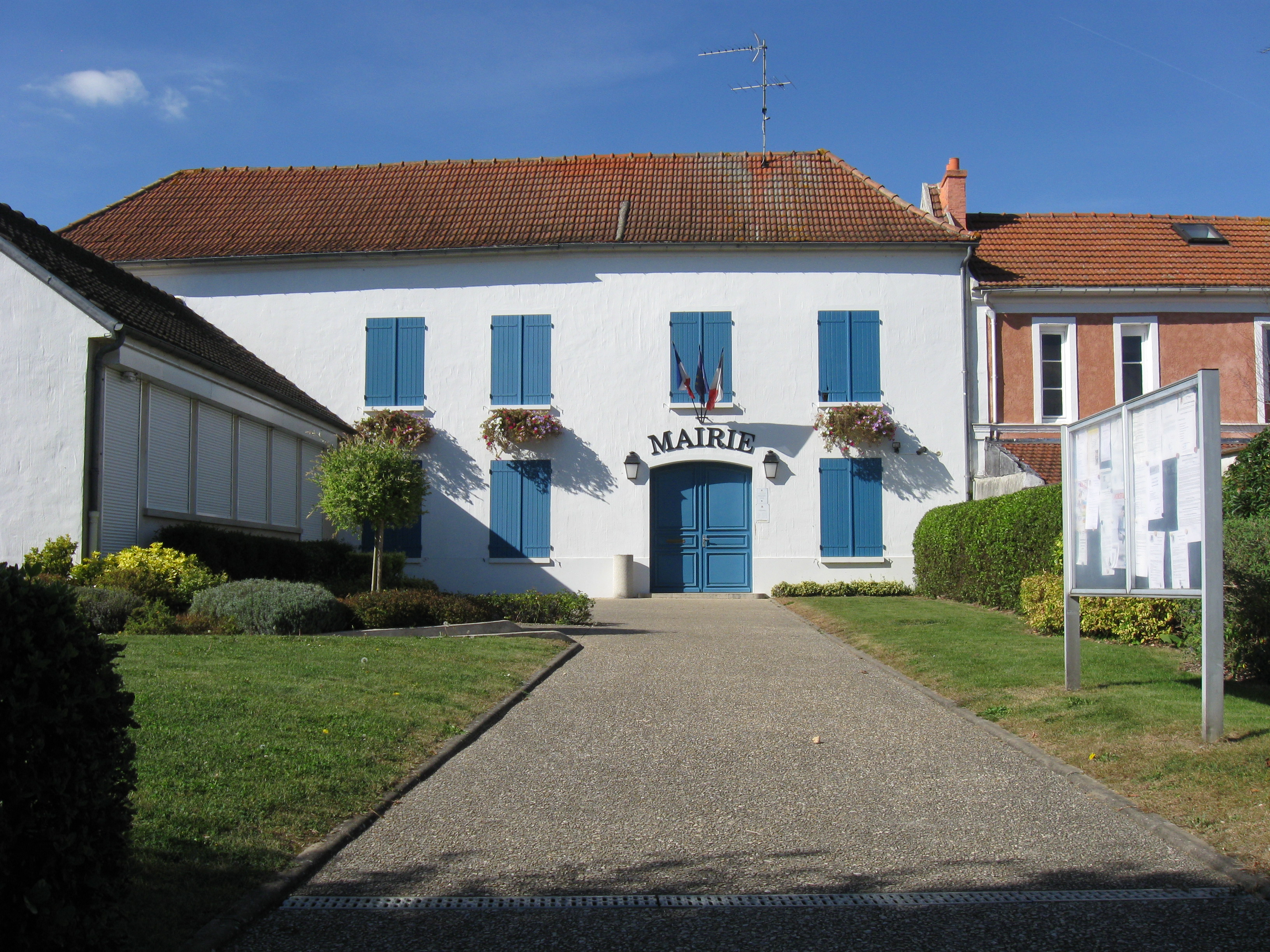
- The town hall in Précy-sur-Marne

- Coat of arms
- Location of Précy-sur-Marne
- Location within France Location within Île-de-France (region)
- Coordinates: 48°55′50″N 2°46′30″E
- Country: France
- Region: Île-de-France
- Department: Seine-et-Marne
- Arrondissement: Meaux
- Canton: Claye-Souilly
- Intercommunality: CC Plaines et Monts de France

Government
  - Mayor (2020–2026): Christine Lyna Augry
- Area^{1}: 4.81 km^{2} (1.86 sq mi)
- Highest elevation: 83 m (272 ft)
- Lowest elevation: 39 m (128 ft)
- Population (2023): 747
  - Density: 155/km^{2} (402/sq mi)
- Demonym: Précyens
- Time zone: UTC+01:00 (CET)
  - Summer (DST): UTC+02:00 (CEST)
- INSEE/Postal code: 77376 /77410
- ^{1} French Land Register data, which excludes lakes, ponds, glaciers > 1 km^{2} (0.386 sq mi or 247 acres) and river estuaries.

Précy-sur-Marne (French pronunciation: [pʁesi syʁ maʁn]; lit. 'Précy-on-Marne') is a commune in the Seine-et-Marne department in the Île-de-France region in northern France.

== Demographics ==
The inhabitants are called Précyens (masculine) and Précyennes (feminine).

== People ==
- Barbara, a French singer, had a house in the village, and had dedicated a song to it (Précy jardin).
- Yves Duteil, singer-songwriter, mayor of Précy-sur-Marne between 1989 and 2014.

== See also ==
- Communes of the Seine-et-Marne department
