= Kastelruther Spatzen =

Italian band

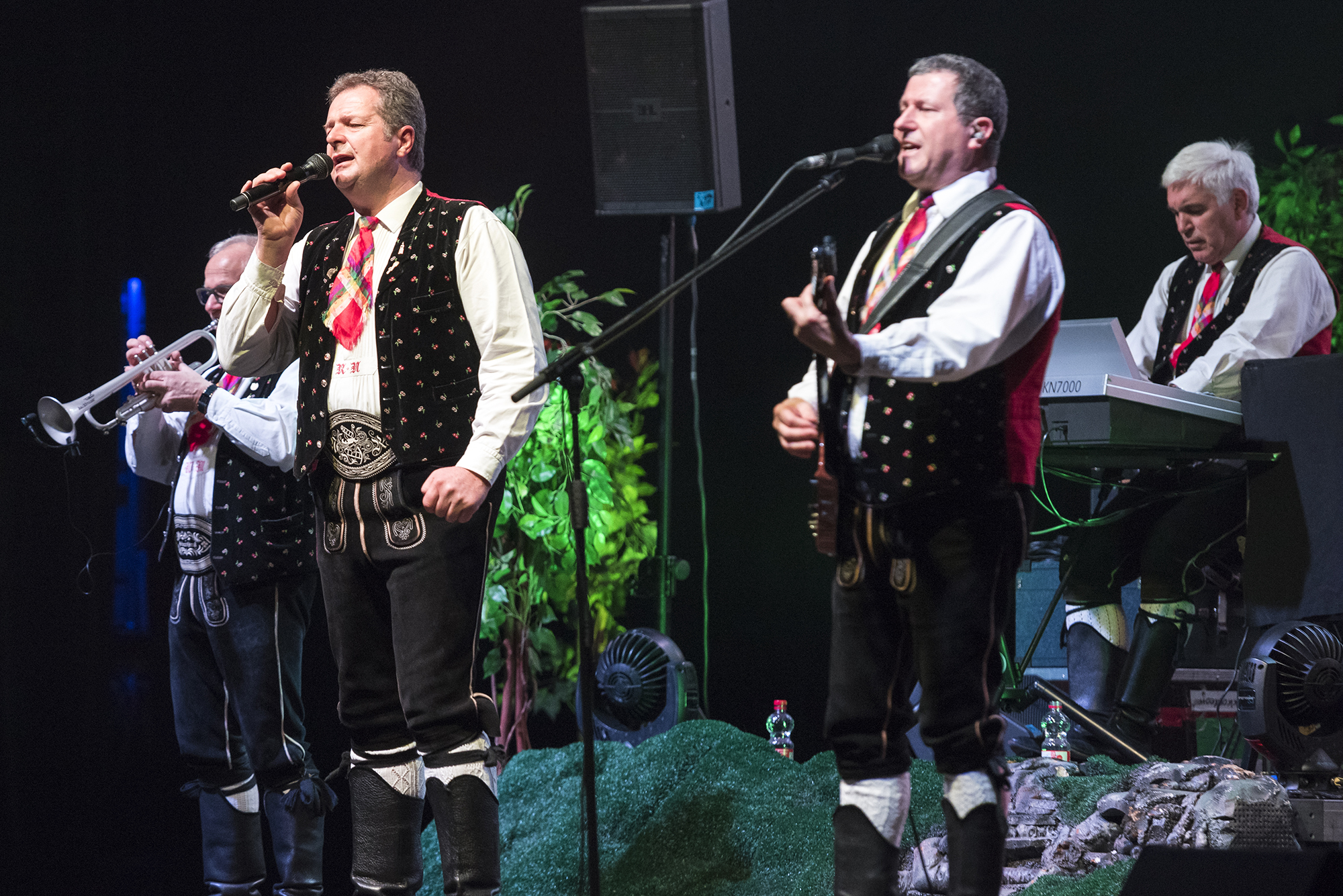
- Kastelruther Spatzen (2016)

Background information
- Origin: Kastelruth, South Tyrol, Italy
- Genre: Folk music
- Years active: 1976–present
- Members: Valentin Silbernagl; Walter Mauroner; Norbert Rier; Albin Gross; Karl Heufler; Kurt Dasser; Rüdiger Hemmelmann
- Past members: Karl Schieder; Oswald Sattler; Ferdinand Rier; Anton Rier; Andreas Fulterer
- Website: www.kastelruther-spatzen.de

The Kastelruther Spatzen (German for Kastelruth sparrows) are a musical group from South Tyrol, northern Italy, who have won many honours and awards for their schlager in folk music style.

== Members ==
The Kastelruther Spatzen were formed in 1976 by Karl Schieder, Walter Mauroner, Valentin Silbernagl, Oswald Sattler, Ferdinand Rier and Anton Rier. Anton Rier left in 1977, and Norbert Rier joined as the drummer in 1979. Ferdinand Rier left in 1980 and was replaced by Albin Gross. In 1983, with this line-up, they released their first single, Das Mädchen mit den erloschenen Augen, which was awarded a golden disc.

In 1986, Karl Schieder left the group to pursue another career, and was replaced by Karl Heufler. In 1991 Rüdiger Hemmelmann joined the band as a drummer. In 1993, Oswald Sattler left for a solo career, and was replaced by Andreas Fulterer, who left five years later also for a solo career. He was then replaced by Kurt Dasser.

=== Karl Schieder ===
Karl Schieder is the founder of the Kastelruther Spatzen and played the baritone. In 1986 he left the band for personal reasons.

=== Valentin Silbernagl ===
Valentin Silbernagl was born on 18 June 1956 in Kastelruth and played for eight years in the Musikkapelle Kastelruth before joining the Kastelruther Spatzen. He married in 1982 and has three children.

=== Walter Mauroner ===
Walter Mauroner was born on 20 June 1956 in Bozen and played for fifteen years in the Musikkapelle Kastelruth before joining the Kastelruther Spatzen, where he plays the trumpet. He married in 1984 and has two children. He is the owner of the fan shop, the Spatzenladen, in Kastelruth.

=== Oswald Sattler ===
Oswald Sattler was born on 7 December 1957 in Kastelruth, and played guitar and sang with the Kastelruther Spatzen until he left them in 1993. He started a solo career in 1996, and has won the Grand Prix der Volksmusik once and the Goldene Stimmgabel twice. He sings with the group Die Bergkameraden and won the German national round of the Grand Prix der Volksmusik with them in 2009 to reach the final.

=== Ferdinand Rier ===
One of the original members of the Kastelruther Spatzen, Ferdinand Rier left the group in 1980 to start a family.

=== Anton Rier ===
One of the original members of the Kastelruther Spatzen, Anton Rier was the first member to leave the group, in 1977.

=== Norbert Rier ===
Norbert Rier is the lead singer of the Kastelruther Spatzen. He was born on 14 April 1960, is married to Isabella and has four children, with two of whom he has recorded songs - Marion in 1994 and Andreas in 2004. He joined the Kastelruther Spatzen as drummer and singer in late 1979. In May 2006, his autobiography was published, Danke Fans! Die authentische Autobiographie des Kastelruther Spatzen Chefs, BLV Buchverlag, München 2006, ISBN 3-8354-0258-7. He is the uncle of Denise Karbon and Peter Fill.

=== Albin Gross ===
Albin Gross was born on 2 April 1955 in Kastelruth. He married in 1980 and has three daughters. Before Karl Schieder brought him into the Kastelruther Spatzen in 1980, where he plays keyboard and accordion, and is also a composer and lyricist, he performed with the Seiser Buam.

=== Karl Heufler ===
Karl Heufler was born on 23 September 1959 in Kastelruth. He married in 1984 and has two children. He played in the Musikkapelle Seis am Schlern and in the Schlernsextett before he joined the Kastelruther Spatzen in 1986 as a replacement for Karl Schieder, playing bass guitar and horn.

=== Rüdiger Hemmelmann ===
Rüdiger Hemmelmann was born on 13 March 1966 in Würzburg. Since 1991 he is the drummer of the Kastelruther Spatzen.

=== Andreas Fulterer † ===
Andreas Fulterer was born on 27 February 1961 in Kastelruth and joined the Kastelruther Spatzen in 1993, when he replaced Oswald Sattler and left again in 1998. In his solo career that followed, he moved away from folk music to schlager. He died on 26 October 2016 after he suffered from lung cancer.

=== Kurt Dasser ===
Kurt Dasser was born on 8 February 1958 in Bolzano. He worked for twenty years in Bolzano as a mathematics and biology teacher. He is divorced and has a son. He plays guitar and sings with the Kastelruther Spatzen.

== Kastelruther Spatzenfest ==
The Kastelruther Spatzenfest is a concert which has been held annually since 1984. In 2005 there were approximately 30,000 people attending it.

== Discography ==
=== Albums ===
- Viel Spaß und Freude, 1983
- Ich sag's Dir mit Musik, 1985
- Musikantengold, 1986
- Servus Südtirol, 1987
- Weihnachtssterne, 1987
- Wenn Berge träumen, 1988
- Doch die Sehnsucht bleibt, 1989
- Feuer im ewigen Eis, 1990. GER: Gold
- Wahrheit ist ein schmaler Grat, 1991. GER: Gold
- Eine weiße Rose, 1992. GER: Gold
- Die schönsten Liebeslieder der Kastelruther Spatzen, 1992
- Der rote Diamant, 1993. GER: Gold
- Das Mädchen mit den erloschenen Augen, 1993
- Spreng Die ketten Der Einsamkeit, 1994
- Atlantis der Berge, 1994. GER: Gold
- Nino und das Geheimnis des Friedens, 1994
- Das erste Gebot ist die Liebe, 1995. GER: Gold
- Sterne über'm Rosengarten, 1996. GER: Gold
- Herzschlag für Herzschlag, 1997. GER: Gold
- Die weiße Braut der Berge, 1998
- Weihnachten mit den Kastelruhter Spatzen, 1998
- Die Legende von Croderes, 1999
- Und ewig wird der Himmel brennen, 2000. GER: Gold
- Jedes Abendrot ist ein Gebet, 2001. GER: Gold
- Ihre Ersten Erfolge, 2001
- Liebe darf alles, 2002. GER: Gold
- Das Frühlingsfest der Volksmusik - Das Gold-Jubiläum der Kastelruther Spatzen Doppel-CD, 2002
- Herzenssache, 2003. GER: Gold
- Alles Gold dieser Erde, 2003. GER: Gold
- 16 Spatzen-Hits Instrumental, 2004
- Berg ohne Wiederkehr, 2004. GER: Platinum
- Zufall oder Schicksal, 2005. GER: Gold
- Nino und das Geheimnis des Friedens, 2005 (Remake with 2 extra titles)
- Und Singen ist Gold, 2006. GER: Gold
- Dolomitenfeuer, 2007. GER: Gold
- Geschrieben für die Ewigkeit - Besinnliche Lieder, 2008 (Bonus Album)
- Jeder Tag ist eine Rose, 2008 (Bonus Album)
- Herz gewinnt, Herz verliert, 2008. GER: Gold
- Ein Kreuz und eine Rose, 2009. GER: Gold
- Immer noch wie am ersten Tag, 2010.
- Hand auf's Herz, 2011.
- Weihnachten bei uns daheim, 2011.
- Leben und leben lassen, 2012.
- Planet der Lieder, 2013.
- Eine Brücke ins Glück, 2014
- Heimat - Deine Lieder, 2015
- Die Sonne scheint für alle, 2016
- Die Tränen der Dolomiten, 2017
- Älter werden wir später, 2018
- Feuervogel flieg, 2019
- Liebe für die Ewigkeit, 2020
- HeimatLiebe, 2021
- HeimatLiebe Weihnacht, 2021

=== Live albums ===
- Kastelruther Spatzen live in Berlin, 1996

=== Compilation albums ===
- Das Beste der Kastelruther Spatzen Folge 1, 1991
- Kastelruther Classics Folge 1, 1994
- Das Beste der Kastelruther Spatzen Folge 2, 1995. GER: Gold
- Träume von Liebe und Zärtlichkeit, 1996
- Kastelruther Classics Folge 2, 1997
- Das Beste der Kastelruther Spatzen Folge 3, 2001. GER: Gold
- 25 Jahre Kastelruther Spazen, 2009
- Engel der Dolomiten, 2012
- Apres Ski – Kult-Hits im Party, 2015
- Das Beste aus 35 Jahren, 2018

=== DVDs ===
- Das Beste Folge 1. GER: Gold
- Das Beste Folge 2. GER: Gold
- Herzschlag für Herzschlag. GER: Gold
- Das große Kastelruther Spatzenfest
- Ich würd es wieder tun
- Berg ohne Wiederkehr. GER: Gold
- Dolomitenfeuer. GER: Gold

=== Singles ===
- "Das Mädchen mit den erloschenen Augen" (1983)
- "Tränen passen nicht zu Dir" (1990)
- "Feuer im ewigen Eis" (1990)
- "Spreng die Ketten Deiner Einsamkeit" (1991)
- "Wahrheit ist ein schmaler Grat" (1991)
- "Eine weiße Rose" (1992)
- "Schatten über'm Rosenhof" (1992)
- "Und ewig ruft die Heimat" (1993)
- "Der rote Diamant" (1993)
- "Atlantis der Berge" (1994)
- "Che bella la vita" (1994)
- "Du gehörst in meine Arme" (1994)
- "Das Lied der Dornenvögel" (1996)
- "Herzschlag für Herzschlag" (1997)
- "Ich schwör" (1997)
- "Die weiße Braut der Berge" (1998)
- "Und ewig wird der Himmel brennen" (2000)
- "Ein Leben lang" (2000)
- "Jeder Tag ist eine Rose" (2000)
- "Jedes Abendrot ist ein Gebet" (2001)
- "Liebe darf alles" (2002)
- "Herzenssache" (2003)
- "Berg ohne Wiederkehr" (2004)
- "Zufall oder Schicksal" (2005)
- "Gott hatte einen Traum" (2005)
- "... und Singen ist Gold" (2006)
- "Das Geheimnis der drei Worte" (2007)

== Honours and awards ==
- Grand Prix der Volksmusik 1990 for Germany (Tränen passen nicht zu dir)
- Edelweiß 1991 and 1993
- ECHO in the category Schlager/folk music: 1993, 1996, 1997, 1998 in the category Folk music with Dieter Thomas Kuhn & Band winning the category Schlager, 1999 in the category Folk music with Guildo Horn & die orthopädischen Strümpfe winning the category Schlager, 2000 in the category Folk music with Die Flippers winning the category Schlager, 2001, 2003, 2006, 2007, 2008, 2009, 2010
- Goldene Stimmgabel 1996, 1997, 1999, 2003, 2007
- Krone der Volksmusik: 1998, 2000, 2001, 2002, 2005, 2006, 2007, 2008, 2009, 2010
- Amadeus Austrian Music Award nominations 2001, 2002, 2003, 2004, 2005, 2006
