= Berlin, Kapstadt, Prag =

Studio album by Annett Louisan
- Released: 13 May 2016
- Recorded: 2016
- Genre: Pop; acoustic pop
- Length: 41:17
- Label: Columbia

Annett Louisan chronology
Zu viel Information (2014)	Berlin, Kapstadt, Prag (2016)	Kleine große Liebe (2019)

Berlin, Kapstadt, Prag (English: Berlin, Cape Town, Prague) is the seventh studio album by German recording artist Annett Louisan, released by Columbia Records on 13 May 2016 in German-speaking Europe. Conceived amid the recording of Louisan's follow-up to her 2014 album Zu viel Information, conception of the album was motivated by her appearance on the reality television series Sing meinen Song (2016), the German version of The Best Singers series, for which Louisan had reworked several original songs. A breakaway from the chanson genre on her previous albums, recording of Louisan's pop renditions took place in Prague.

== Track listing ==
Standard edition
No.	Title	Original Artist(s)	Length
1.	"Engel"	Rammstein	4:03
2.	"Das Modell"	Kraftwerk	3:39
3.	"OMG!"	Marteria	3:20
4.	"Bologna"	Wanda	4:02
5.	"Wie soll ein Mensch das ertragen"	Philipp Poisel	4:31
6.	"Stark"	Ich + Ich	6:17
7.	"Durch den Monsun"	Tokio Hotel	4:13
8.	"Solang' man Träume noch leben kann"	Münchener Freiheit	3:29
9.	"Merci, Chérie"	Udo Jürgens	2:54
10.	"Helden"	David Bowie	4:48

== Charts ==
Chart (2016)	Peak position
Austrian Albums (Ö3 Austria)	22
German Albums (Offizielle Top 100)	11
Swiss Albums (Schweizer Hitparade)	32

== Release history ==
Region	Date	Format	Label
Austria	13 May 2016	Digital download, CD	Columbia Records
Germany	13 May 2016	Digital download, CD	Columbia Records
Switzerland	13 May 2016	Digital download, CD	Columbia Records
