= Annett Louisan =

German singer

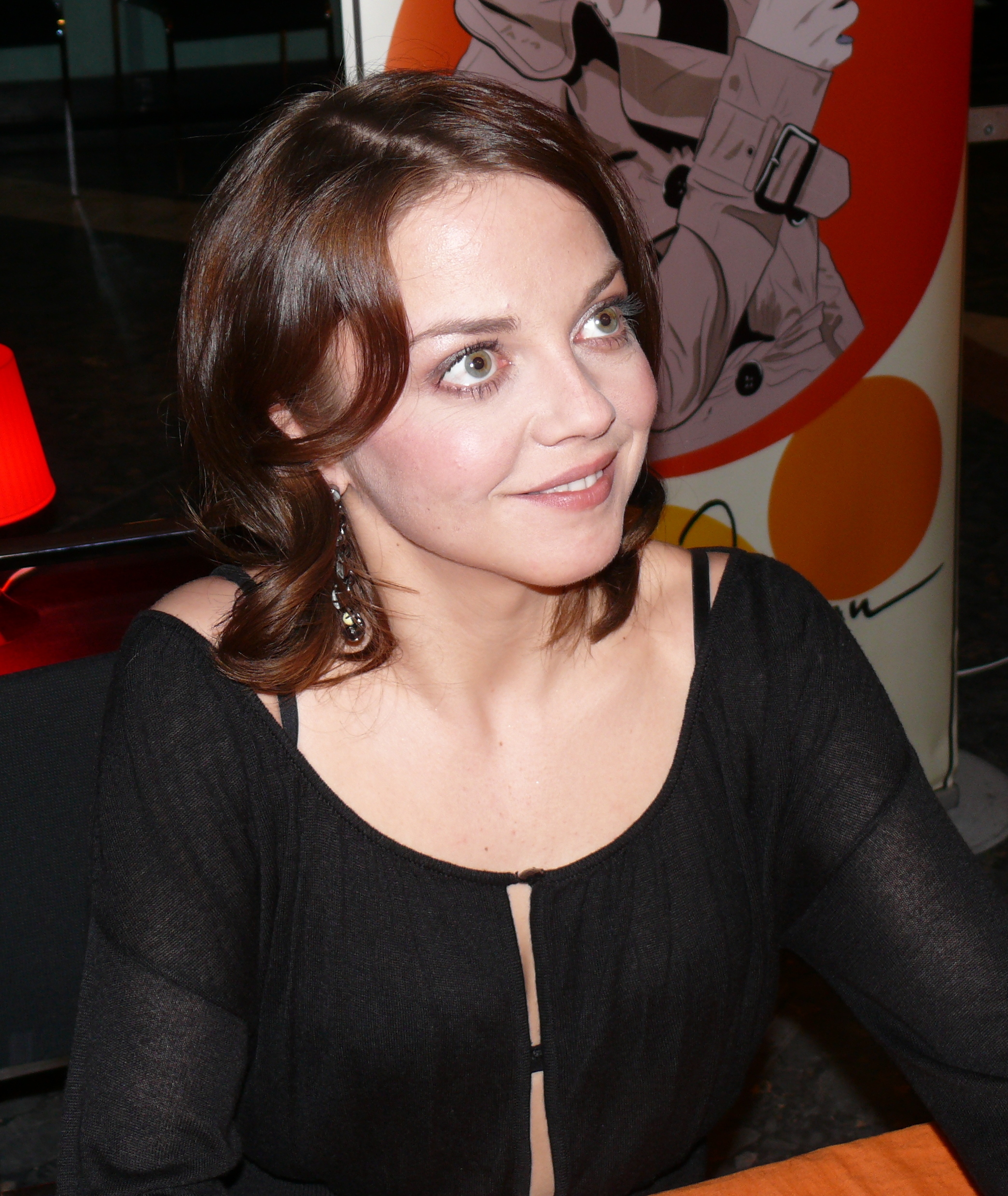
- Louisan in 2009

Background information
- Born: Annett Päge; 2 April 1977 (age 49); Havelberg, Germany
- Genres: German pop; chanson; acoustic pop
- Occupation: Singer
- Years active: 2004–present
- Label: 105 Music/Sony BMG
- Website: annettlouisan.de

Annett Louisan (born Annett Päge; 2 April 1977) is a German singer. Louisan is her stage name, derived from the name of her grandmother, Louise. Her first album, Bohème, was listed on the German charts for almost a year, with a peak ranking of third place.

== Musical style ==
Louisan plays a wide variety of music with blues, soul, jazz and swing. The lyrics of her songs are mostly about love, failure and disappointment. Annett Louisan is one of the few German artists who have obtained a high-profile with chanson-style songs. Apart from Louisan's own musical interpretation this is due to the lyrics of her producer, Frank Ramond, as well as the compositions of her songwriters, Hardy Kayser and Matthias Hass. Her lyrics also deal with the politicized issues of female self-conception and societal roles, creating a complex ambivalence. This became most apparent with her first single Das Spiel. In this song roles with contrary approaches to sexuality and interpersonal relationships (i.e. the child, the woman and the emancipated career) are combined. Musically, her second album moves away from pop and concentrates more on the French-German chanson-tradition. Bal-musette, Tango and Bossa Nova rhythms give the songs diversity. Unobtrusive backings allow the often breathy voice of Louisan to remain prominent.

== Personal life ==
Louisan was born in Havelberg. In 2004, she married Gazi Işıkatlı, a Turkish business student, but they divorced in 2008. In June 2014, Louisan married songwriter and Hamburg native Marcus Brosch. Their daughter was born in 2017.

== Discography ==
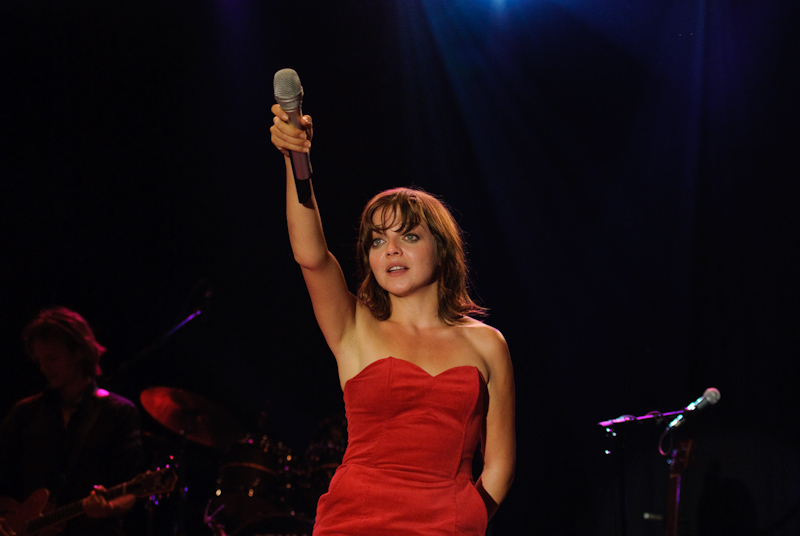
Louisan performing in 2009

=== Studio albums ===
List of albums, with selected chart positions and certifications
Title	Album details	Peak chart positions			Certifications
Title	Album details	GER	AUT	SWI	Certifications
Bohème	Released: 25 October 2004; Label: 105music; Formats: CD, digital download	3	11	23	BVMI: 5× Gold
Unausgesprochen	Released: 21 October 2005; Label: 105Music; Formats: CD, digital download	3	19	49	BVMI: Platinum
Das optimale Leben	Released: 31 August 2007; Label: 105music; Formats: CD, digital download	2	6	7	BVMI: Platinum
Teilzeithippie	Released: 17 October 2008; Label: 105music; Formats: CD, digital download	2	6	11	BVMI: Platinum; IFPI AUT: Gold
In meiner Mitte	Released: 2 September 2011; Label: 105music; Formats: CD, digital download	2	5	22	BVMI: Gold
Zu viel Information	Released: 14 February 2014; Label: 105music; Formats: CD, digital download	3	4	8	BVMI: Gold
Berlin, Kapstadt, Prag	Released: 13 May 2016; Label: Columbia; Formats: CD, digital download	11	22	32	
Kleine große Liebe	Released: 29 March 2019; Label: Columbia; Formats: CD, digital download	6	11	14	
Kitsch	Released: 21 August 2020; Label: Columbia; Formats: CD, digital download	7	9	29	
Babyblue	Released: 17 February 2023; Label: Columbia; Formats: CD, digital download	8	29	65	

=== Compilation albums ===
List of albums, with selected chart positions
Title	Album details	Peak chart positions
Title	Album details	GER
Song Poeten.	Released: 25 September 2015; Label: 105music; Formats: CD, digital download	56

=== Singles ===
List of singles, with selected chart positions
Title	Year	Chart positions				Album
Title	Year	GER	AUT	EU	SWI	Album
"Das Spiel"	2004	5	12	17	66	Bohème
"Das Gefühl"	2005	34	64	—	—	Bohème
"Das große Erwachen (...und jetzt...)"	2005	52	68	—	—	Unausgesprochen
"Eve" (digital single)	2006	—	—	—	—	Unausgesprochen
"Wer bin ich wirklich"	2006	29	54	—	46	Unausgesprochen
"Das alles wär nie passiert"	2007	52	71	—	30	Das optimale Leben
"Was haben wir gesucht?"	2007	—	—	—	—	Das optimale Leben
"Drück die 1"	2008	38	60	—	—	Teilzeithippie
"Auf dich hab ich gewartet"	2009	83	—	—	—	Teilzeithippie
"Verschwinde"	2011	—	—	—	—	In meiner Mitte
"Pärchenallergie"	2011	—	—	—	—	In meiner Mitte
"Dein Ding"	2014	—	—	—	—	Zu viel Information

== Awards ==
=== 2005 ===
- ECHO: Female Artist of the Year (National Rock/Pop)
- Goldene Stimmgabel: Best Female Solo Artist (Pop)
