= Yves Duteil =

French singer-songwriter (born 1949)

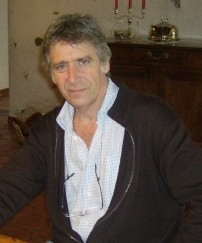

Background information
- Born: 24 July 1949 (age 76); Neuilly-sur-Seine, Île-de-France, France
- Occupation(s): Singer, songwriter
- Instrument(s): Guitar, piano
- Years active: 1972–present
- Spouse: Noëlle Léonore Mallard (1975–present)
- Website: blog.yvesduteil.com

Yves Duteil (born 24 July 1949) is a French singer-songwriter. His most famous song is "Prendre un enfant". Duteil was the mayor of Précy-sur-Marne from 1989 to 2014.

== Personal life ==
Yves Duteil was born on 24 July 1949 in Neuilly-sur-Seine, Île-de-France. His parents were Robert Duteil (1904–1998), an import and export agent, and Brunette May (1914–1973), a jeweler. He is the third child to be born in the family.

Duteil is the grandson of Eugène Jules Duteil (né Deutsch; 1865–1953) and of Alice Pauline Hadamard (1875–1965). Duteil is also the grandnephew of Alfred Dreyfus.

Duteil married Noëlle Léonore Mallard at Franconville (Val d'Oise) in 1975; they have a daughter, Martine, and a grandson, Toussaint. According to Duteil, Noëlle has a major role in his music, because he writes a lot of it for her, and she helps him produce it in return.

== Musical career ==
In 1972, Duteil met Frédéric Botton, who told him to finish "Virages" (English: Road turns). Eight days later, it was recorded and released as his first single. In 1974, he released his first album, L'Écritoire. In 1976, he released his second album, J'attends. Duteil decided that if J'attends failed, he would quit music, writing "if they don't want what I make, we will give up" (French: s'ils ne veulent pas de ce que je fais, on va laisser tomber). He was happy with how J'attends did, and kept writing music.

In 1997, Duteil released his album Touché, featuring the song "Dreyfus", dedicated to Alfred Dreyfus.

=== "Prendre un enfant" ===
His 1977 album Tarentelle includes his most famous song, "Prendre un enfant". "Prendre un enfant" was voted the best French song of the century by a survey by Notre Temps in 1987, and then in a 1988 survey by SACEM, RTL, and Canal+. Duteil's reaction was that he did not know what to do next, because he felt he could not write a more successful song, so his career would never go higher. After "Prendre un enfant", Duteil decided to "change gears" (French: passer à un braquet différent).

== Mayor of Précy-sur-Marne ==
From 1989 to 2014, Duteil was mayor of Précy-sur-Marne, Île-de-France. He decided not to run for a fifth term, because of his health, his family, and to concentrate on making music.

== Recognition ==
In 1990, Duteil was made a Chevalier de L'Ordre national du Mérite, and in 1996, Chevalier of the Legion of Honour. On 5 April 2023, Duteil was made a Knight of the National Order of Quebec.

== Filmography ==
=== Actor ===
- 2016: Faeryland by Magà Ettori: William

=== Original music ===
- 2011: La Marche de l'Enfant Roi by Magà Ettori: song Maquisardes (Magà Ettori / Patrice Bernardini)
- 2016: Faeryland by Magà Ettori: songs Lame de fond and La Chanson des Justes

== Discography ==
- 1972: Virages (single)
- 1974: L'écritoire
- 1976: J'attends
- 1977: Tarentelle
- 1978: En public au théâtre des Champs-Elysées
- 1979: Mélancolie (retitled J'ai la guitare)
- 1980: Yves Duteil chante pour les enfants
- 1981: Ça n'est pas ce qu'on fait qui compte
- 1982: L'Olympia
- 1982: Les saisons Grand-Père, disc-book
- 1983: La statue d'ivoire
- 1985: La langue de chez nous
- 1985: L'univers musical Jean Musy – instrumental
- 1987: Ton absence
- 1988: Côté scène – Olympia
- 1990: Blessures d'enfance
- 1991: En public – spectacle au Zénith
- 1992: Vos préférences, compilation
- 1992: La fleur de l'impossible – Alberville
- 1993: Ligne de vie
- 1994: Entre elles et moi – duos
- 1996: Pour les enfants (compilation)
- 1997: Touché
- 1997: Correspondences, 4-CD compilation
- 2001: Sans attendre
- 2002: Yves Duteil chante les enfants
- 2003: Yves Duteil chante pour elle
- 2003: Yves Duteil par cœur
- 2004: Tous les droits des enfants
- 2004: Yves Duteil chante l'air des mots
- 2008: (fr)agiles
- 2010: Mes escales..., 2-CD compilation
- 2012: Fragrant délice
- 2013: Prendre un enfant
- 2018: Respect
- 2023: Duteil aux Folies Bergère

== Bibliography ==
- La Langue de chez nous (Nathan editions - 1987) - illustrated children's book, text from the song "La Langue de chez nous", illustrated by Christine Adam.
- Les mots qu'on n'a pas dits (Nathan editions - 1987) - A collection of 96 song texts by Yves Duteil, between 1972 and 1987. Each text is accompanied by a handwritten note by Yves Duteil on the genesis of the song.
- Prendre un enfant (Nathan editions - 1988) - illustrated children's book. A story written by Yves Duteil, illustrated by Yves Beaujard.
- Les Mots qu'on n'a pas dits ("Arc en poche" collection - Nathan editions - 1988) - A collection of 34 song texts by Yves Duteil chosen for young people.
- Le Cirque (Nathan editions - 1990) - illustrated children's book written Yves Duteil, illustrated by Nicole Baron.
- Pour les enfants du monde entier (Nathan editions - 1991) - illustrated children's book. Text from the song "Pour les enfants du monde entier", illustrated by John Howe.
- Ma France buissonnière (Èditions de la Martinière - 1998) - A book of photos accompanied with text by Yves Duteil: songs, poems, reflexion on the French language, Brittany, etc.
- Livre blanc pour y voir plus vert dans les forêts (Edisud editions - 1999) - A book about 75 methods to prevent forest fires.
- Dans l'air des mots - 30 ans de chansons en images (Éditions de la Martinière - 2004) (ISBN 978-2-7324-3123-9). The texts of 102 songs accompanied by photos.
- Les Choses qu'on ne dit pas (Éditions de l'Archipel - 2006) (ISBN 978-2-84187-784-3) - A book of letters addressed to people and things who are important to Duteil.
- La Petite Musique du silence (Médiaspaul editions - 2014) (ISBN 978-2-7122-1260-5). Preface by Bertrand Révillion. In the "Grands Témoins" collection.
- Et si la clef était ailleurs? (Médiaspaul editions - 2017). In the "Grands Témoins" collection.
- Chemins de liberté, 2021, Éditions de L'Archipel.
- Chemin d'écriture, 2023, Éditions de L'Archipel. All of his song texts.
