= Maximilian Arland =

German musician

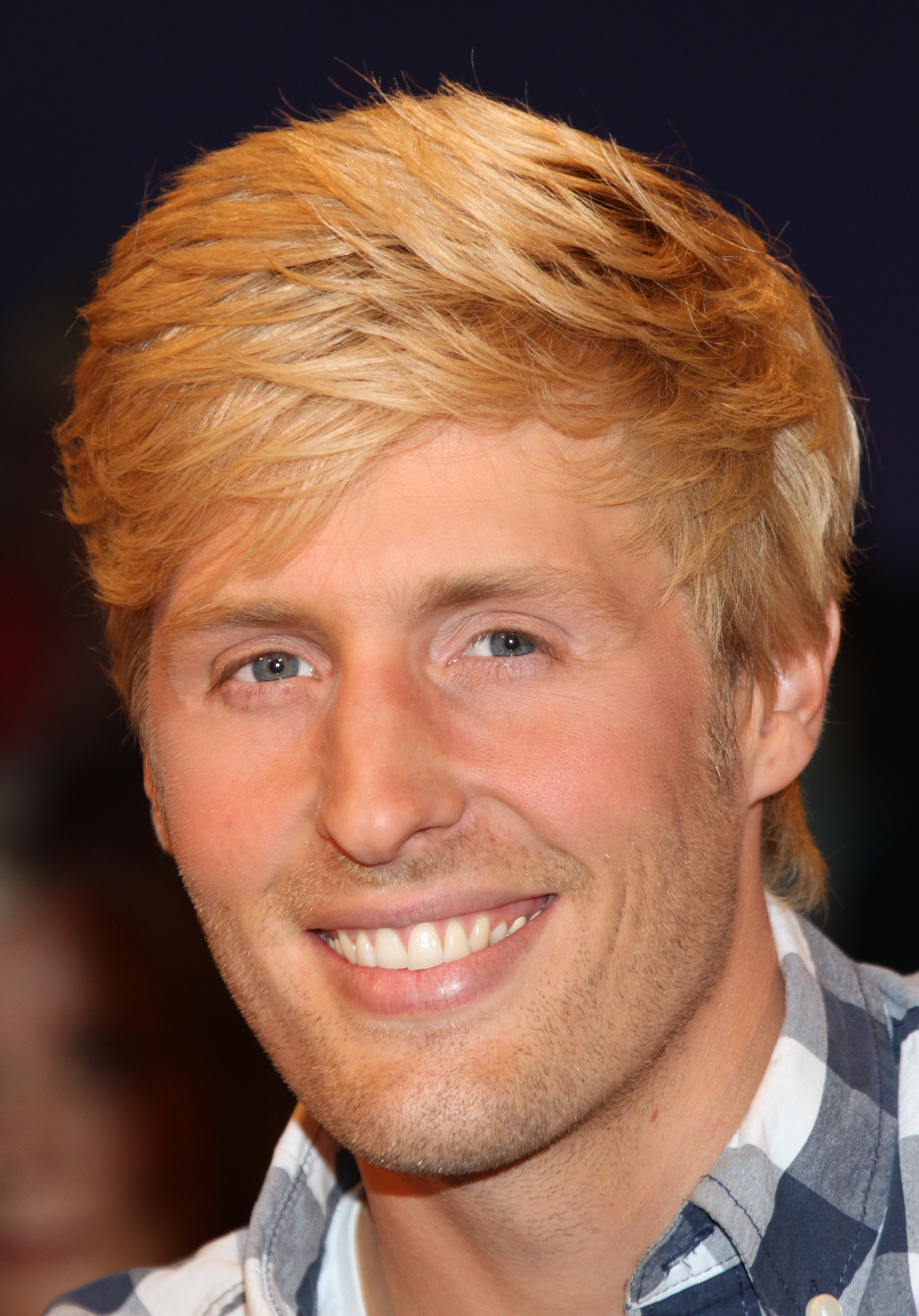
- Arland in 2012

Background information
- Also known as: Maxi Arland
- Born: Maximilian Mühlbauer; 26 March 1981 (age 45); Neuenbürg, West Germany
- Genres: Schlager music
- Occupations: Singer, musician
- Instruments: Vocals, guitar, piano
- Years active: 1993–present
- Member of: Trio Arland
- Website: maximilian-arland.de

Maximilian "Maxi" Arland (civil name Maximilian Mühlbauer; born March 26, 1981) is a German television presenter and singer.

== Life ==
Maximilian Arland is the son of clarinetist and composers Henry Arland and grandson of composer Rolf Arland. In 1993, at the age of twelve, he appeared with his brother Hansi and his father as an instrumental trio in the Volkstümliche Hitparade (Popular hit parade), where they took first place. After that, they were guests on various television shows for years.

In 1994 they won the international Grand Prix of Folk Music with the title Echo der Berge (Echo of the mountains). As a soloist, Arland took first place in the German preliminary decision in 2002 with the title Ich hör Chopin (I listen to Chopin). He took part in the competition a total of five times and was able to qualify for the international final each time. From 1999 to 2006, Arland worked as a presenter and editor at the Germany-wide radio station Radio Melodie, where he also completed a traineeship.

From 2004 to 2011, Arland presented his own Saturday night Television show Musikantendampfer on ARD. He presents numerous television programmes on Mitteldeutscher Rundfunk, Rundfunk Berlin-Brandenburg and Bayerischer Rundfunk and has also hosted the Operettan Gala three times so far as part of the Elblandfestspiele Wittenberge.

Since 2006, Arland has accompanied the New Year's Eve on ARD live from the Brandenburg Gate. In 2009, ARD commissioned him to present the Saturday evening programme Melodien der Herzen (Melodies of the hearts). In 2012 and 2013, Arland presented ARD at the International Consumer Electronics Fair Berlin with a stage programme hosted by him. In succession to Britt Hagedorn, he hosted the third season of the couples' show Schwer Verliebt (Heavily in love) on SAT1. He also appeared in the 10th season of Let's Dance alongside professional dancers Isabel Edvardsson (Show 1–4) and Sarah Latton (since show 5). In early 2017, he changed his stage name Maxi Arland to Maximilian Arland Since 2012, he has presented his own programme Musik auf dem Lande (Music in the countryside) on MDR. As a singer and presenter, Maximilian Arland tours Germany every year and gives solo concerts and open airs (including Elblandfestspiele Wittenberge).

Arland is divorced and lives in Berlin.

== Social commitment ==
Maximilian Arland is involved as an ambassador for the Wege aus der Einsamkeit (Ways out of loneliness) association.

In 2018, he took part in the Ninja Warrior Germany Celeb-Special for the RTL Spendenmarathon (a donation-event by RTL) together with 25 other participants.

== Discography ==
=== Studio albums ===
- 2002: Je t’aime – I love you – Ich liebe Dich
- 2004: Träumen ist doch keine Sünde (Dreaming is not a sin after all)
- 2006: Zwischen Himmel und Liebe (Between heaven and hell)
- 2007: Danke Roy (Thanks Roy)
- 2009: Sag ja zu mir (Say yes to me)
- 2009: Weihnachten mit Maxi Arland (Christmas with Maxi Arland)
- 2010: Aus Liebe (For love)
- 2012: Magische Momente (Magic moments)
- 2015: Ein genialer Tag (A genius day)
- 2016: Mein Weihnachten (My ChristmAs)
- 2017: Liebe in Sicht (Love in sight)
- 2019: 25 Jahre Maximilian Arland & Freunde (25 Years Maximilian Arland & Friends9

=== Singles ===
- 2002: Ich hör Chopin (I listen to Chopin)
- 2004: Träumen ist doch keine Sünde (Dreaming is not a sin after all)
- 2009: Sag ja zu mir (Say yes to me)
- 2009: Das fängt ja gut an (It's off to a good start)
- 2010: Aus Liebe (For love)
- 2013: Du bist mir nah (You are close to me)
- 2014: Ein Tag ohne dich (A day without you)
- 2016: Liebe in Sicht (Love in sight)
- 2016: Verliebt in Berlin (In love in Berlin)
