= Grand Prix der Volksmusik =

- Genre: Song competition
- Created by: Hans R. Beierlein
- Country of origin: Germany; Austria; Switzerland
- Original language: German
- No. of episodes: 25 contests

Production
- Production company: Arbeitsgemeinschaft zur Förderung der musikalischen Unterhaltung

Original release
- Network: ZDF (Germany); SF DRS (Switzerland); ORF (Austria); Rai Sender Bozen (South Tyrol, Italy; 2000–2010)
- Release: 1986 – 2010

The Grand Prix der Volksmusik (English: Grand Prix of Folk Music) was an annual regional song contest for folk music, held from 1986 until 2010. The countries taking part were Germany, Austria, Switzerland and, from 2000, South Tyrol.

== History ==
The competition, established by Hans R. Beierlein (Hans Rudolf Beierlein), began with Germany, Austria and Switzerland in 1986, and the first year it was held in Vienna. In 1989, the German singer Stefan Mross won the contest competing for Austria. In 1990, the South Tyrol group Kastelruther Spatzen won the contest competing for Germany. In 1995, Géraldine Olivier won the contest for Switzerland after having won the Swiss national contest for the 1992 Eurovision Song Contest with Soleil, soleil, which was disqualified before the contest was held. South Tyrol competed from 2000, when they won at their first attempt.

== Production ==
The program was produced by the Arbeitsgemeinschaft zur Förderung der musikalischen Unterhaltung (English: Working Group for the Advancement of Musical Entertainment) as a coproduction of ZDF, SF DRS, ORF and Rai Sender Bozen. The target demographic of the production was adults aged over 40. Each of the four countries competing sent in four entries. On 16 September 2010, ZDF announced the end of the Grand Prix due to low ratings.

== Winners ==
- 1986 Vienna: Nella Martinetti (Switzerland) – Bella Musica
- 1987 Hanover: Maja Brunner (Switzerland) – Das kommt uns spanisch vor
- 1988 Zürich: Original Naabtal Duo (West Germany) – Patrona Bavariae
- 1989 Linz: Stefan Mross (Austria) – Heimwehmelodie
- 1990 Saarbrücken: Kastelruther Spatzen (West Germany) – Tränen passen nicht zu dir
- 1991 Innsbruck: Alpentrio Tirol (Austria) – Hast a bisserl Zeit für mi
- 1992 Zürich: Stefanie Hertel (Germany) – Über jedes Bacherl geht a Brückerl
- 1993 Rostock: Die jungen Klostertaler (Austria) – An a Wunder hob i g'laubt
- 1994 Zürich: Henry Arland with Hansi and Maxi (Germany) – Echo der Berge
- 1995 Vienna: Géraldine Olivier (Switzerland) – Nimm dir wieder einmal Zeit
- 1996 Mainz: Daniela und Dirk (Switzerland) – Monte Cristallo
- 1997 Zürich: Sandra Weiss (Switzerland) – Ich suche nicht das Paradies
- 1998 Vienna: Francine Jordi (Switzerland) – Das Feuer der Sehnsucht
- 1999 Erfurt: Monique (Switzerland) – Einmal so, einmal so
- 2000 Zürich: Oswald Sattler and Jantje Smit (South Tyrol) – Ich zeig dir die Berge
- 2001 Vienna: Marianne Cathomen (Switzerland) – Hey Baby, küss mich noch mal
- 2002 Meran: Nockalm Quintett and Stephanie (Austria) – Dort auf Wolke Sieben
- 2003 Rust: Marc Pircher (Austria) – Hey Diandl, spürst es so wia i
- 2004 Vienna: Die Ladiner (Italy, South Tyrol) – Beuge dich vor grauem Haar
- 2005 Zürich: Die Psayrer mit Barbara (Italy, South Tyrol) – Berge im Feuer
- 2006 Munich: Rudy Giovannini, Belsy and the Coro Monti Pallidi (Italy, South Tyrol) – Salve Regina
- 2007 Vienna: Sigrid & Marina with the Zillertaler Haderlumpen (Austria) – Alles hat zwei Seiten
- 2008 Zürich: Die Klostertaler (Austria) – Heimat ist dort wo die Berge sind
- 2009 Munich: Vincent und Fernando (Italy, South Tyrol) – Der Engel von Marienberg
- 2010 Vienna: Belsy and Florian Fesl (Germany) - I hab Di gern
