= Hans R. Beierlein =

German music manager and publisher (1929–2022)

Hans Rudolf Beierlein (April 19, 1929 – August 5, 2022) was a German music journalist, manager and publisher.

== Biography ==
Beierlein was born in Nuremberg and later resided in Munich. He was involved in the creation of several television programs in Germany, including Eating like God in Germany and Grand Prix der Volksmusik.

Beierlein's career breakthrough came with the discovery of Udo Jürgens in 1963, whose subsequent win at the Eurovision Grand Prix in 1966 with "Merci Chérie" propelled him to stardom. The professional relationship between Jürgens and Beierlein ended in the late 1970s, leading to legal disputes, though they eventually reconciled 17 years later.

Beierlein had a particular interest in folk music, which he considered to be music for the people. Following the fall of the Berlin Wall, he managed the careers of several folk artists, including Stefanie Hertel, and worked with Stefan Mross and Florian Silbereisen. He founded the Grand Prix der Volksmusik in 1986. Beierlein also promoted French musicians like Charles Aznavour and Johnny Hallyday in German-speaking countries and was involved in trading football rights.

Beierlein retired in 2014, selling rights to approximately 5,000 music titles to BMG. was described by Der Spiegel as the "Bavarian Goldfinger" and the "Great White Shark in Wonderland".

After his death, Beierlein's ashes were interred by his adopted daughter, Bizzi Nießlein, in a cemetery in Schliersee, Upper Bavaria, where he owned a villa.
