= Monika Martin =

Austrian singer

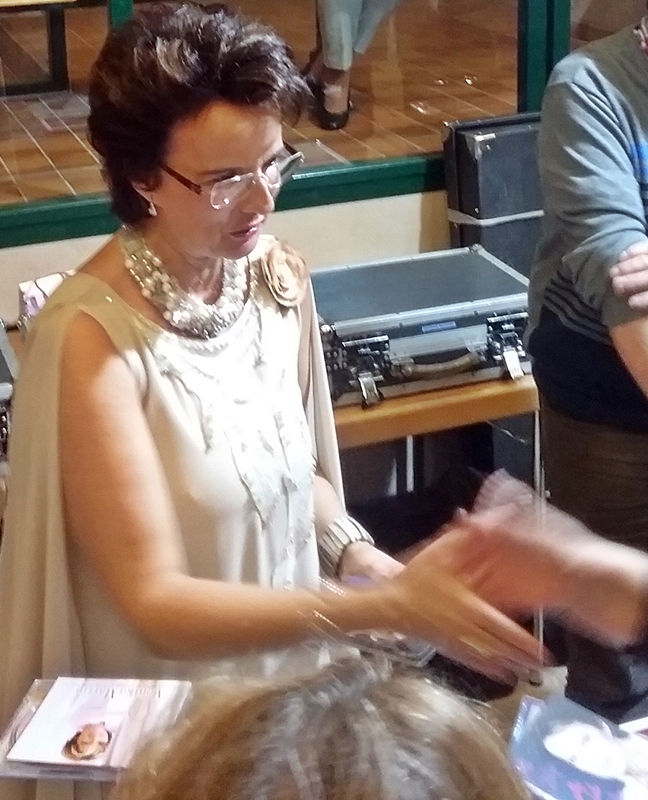
Monika Martin

Monika Martin (born Ilse Bauer on 7 May 1962 in Graz) is an Austrian singer of pop and folk music. Between 1999 and 2021, several of her singles have charted on the Ö3 Austria Top 40, the Swiss Hitparade, and the Deutsche Albumcharts. She was the recipient of the Goldene Stimmgabel prize in September 2006.
