= Volkstümliche Musik =

Derivation of German folk music

Volkstümliche Musik (German for "folksy/traditional/popular music") is a modern popular derivation of the traditional Volksmusik genre of German-speaking regions. Though it is often marketed as Volksmusik, it differs from traditional folk music in that it is commercially performed by celebrity singers and concentrates on newly created sentimental and cheerful feel-good compositions. Volkstümliche Musik is sometimes instrumental, but usually presented by one or especially two singers and is most popular amongst an adult audience in Germany, Austria, Switzerland, and also in South Tyrol (Italy), Alsace-Moselle (France), Netherlands, Flanders (Belgium), Slovenia, Silesia (Poland) and northern Croatia.

== Characteristics ==
Closely related to the German schlager genre, many titles stress a Heimat affect, being presented in regional dialects (e.g. Bavarian, Upper Saxon, Low German) or colloquial language (e.g. Rhinelandic) and invoke local and regional lifestyles and traditions, particularly dances. Brass and Alpine musical instruments, such as Alphorns, Zithers, acoustic guitars, violas, and harmonicas are frequently featured, although most commercial productions nowadays employ drum machines and synthesizers. Yodeling is also common.

== History ==
From the early 1960s onwards, Volkstümliche Musik was conceived for commercial reasons as a counterweight to youth-oriented rock and pop music. The adjective volkstümlich refers to the borrowing of German folklore elements (Volkstum), connecting them to virtually all kinds of light dance and popular music of the 19th and early 20th centuries, from waltz to swing music. The large popularity of this music genre led to the development of volkstümliche record charts and various radio and television broadcasts with popular presenters like Carolin Reiber or Maria Hellwig.

Volkstümliche Musik was influenced by Flower Power songs as well as by popular classical pieces during the 1970s and has been increasingly mingled with schlager music, promoted by successful singers like Heino serving as a model for performers like Die Flippers, Andy Borg or Kristina Bach. Its diffusion was further boosted by comprehensive TV broadcasting with some of the most popular programmes including Musikantenstadl (since 1981), Grand Prix der Volksmusik (1986–2010) and Lustige Musikanten with Marianne & Michael. Beside Volkstümliche Musik, these telecasts also feature big bands, country and even samba music.

In East Germany, too, there was a Volkstümliche Musik scene, with Eberhard Hertel being a very popular performer. He also introduced his daughter Stefanie to the scene, performing with her. She is now a famous performer in her own right. Both continued their careers after German Reunification.

== Reception ==
Modelled on Musikantenstadl, since the early 1990s Volkstümliche Musik has featured in numerous peak-time television broadcasts on German, Austrian and Swiss public TV networks including ARD, ZDF, ORF and Schweizer Fernsehen as well as several regional TV networks and local radio stations. Commercial broadcasters tend to not broadcast it because it is less popular with younger target groups up to 49 years of age; however, several cable and satellite television stations focus on the genre.

Not unlike schlager, Volkstümliche Musik is often belittled by younger or more sophisticated audiences as a massively commercialized product created for the lower strata of society, conveying idyllic, reactionary, irrational ideas. Those holding these views sometimes sarcastically deride the expression "volkstümliche Musik" (folksy/folk-like music) by replacing the "-tümlich"(-like)-suffix by "-dümmlich", meaning roughly "featherbrained", turning it into "folk-featherbrained Music", e.g. dim-witted, daft or dopey. Sociological surveys confirm a predominant conservative attitude among the target population, who often feel that Volkstümliche Musik performances provide a means of stress alleviation and escapism. In this perception, Volkstümliche Musik differs somewhat from its ancestor, the traditional folk (Volksmusik), which continues to be performed by many local groups and orchestras in different areas.

The Volkstümliche Musik market is the largest section of the music business in German-speaking areas. Due to the advanced age of the main target group, copyright infringement has not been prevalent so far.

=== United Kingdom ===
Though the term is mainly unknown in the United Kingdom, volkstümliche Musik has attracted a fanbase there including BBC Radio Manchester commentator, Ian Cheeseman. A number of British singers have also been attracted to this style of music, even featuring on Musikantenstadl, such as Ross Antony, Tony Christie and Roger Whittaker.

== See also ==
- Music of Germany
- Austrian folk dancing
