= Eberhard Hertel =

German singer (1938–2024)

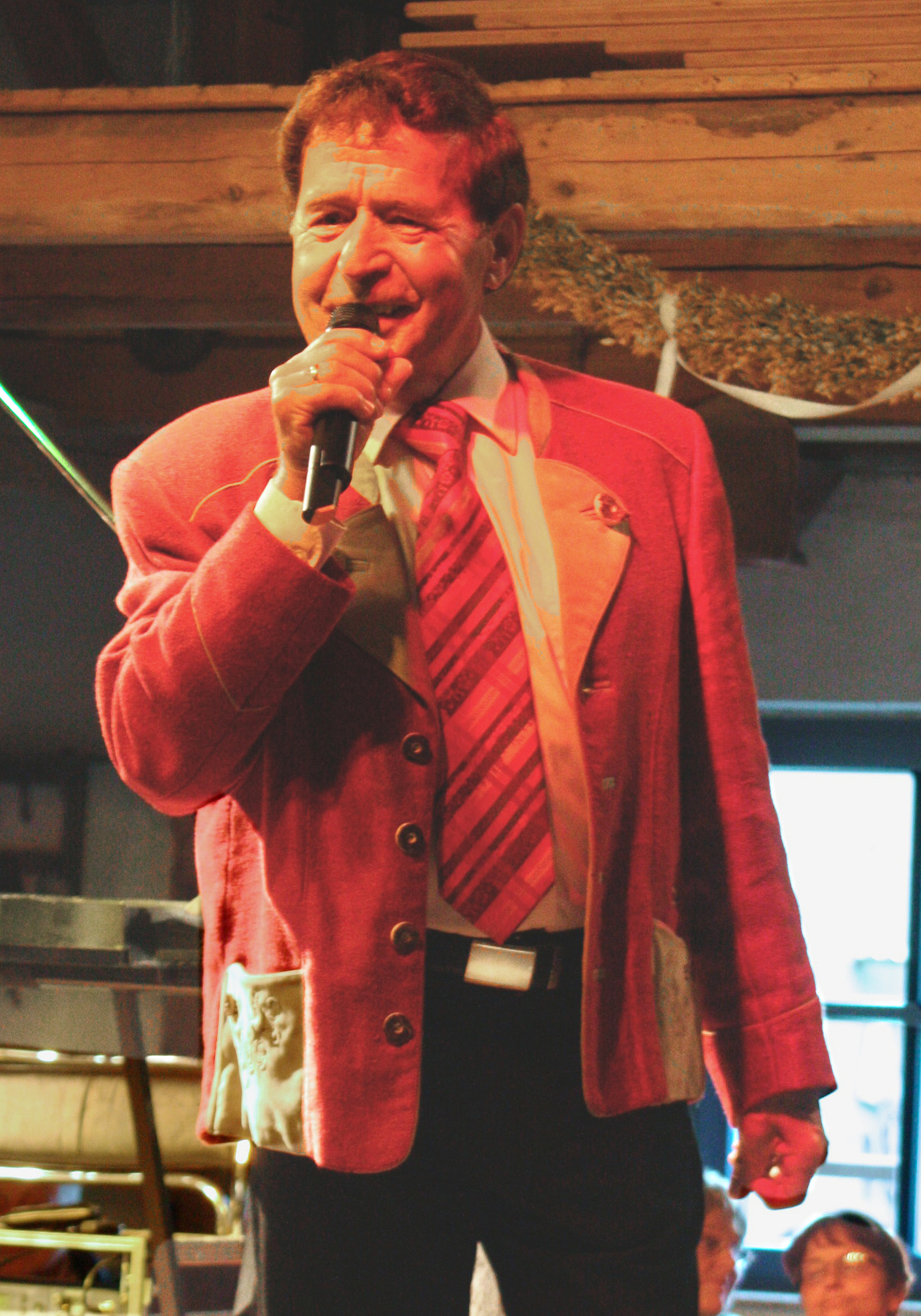
- Hertel in 2012

Background information
- Born: 29 November 1938; Oelsnitz, Vogtland, Gau Saxony, Germany
- Origin: German
- Died: 20 June 2024 (aged 85)
- Genres: Volkstümliche Musik
- Occupation: Singer
- Years active: 1976–2024
- Spouse: Elisabeth Hertel (1950–2017)

Eberhard Hertel (German: [ˈeːbɐhaʁt ˈhɛʁtl̩]; 29 November 1938 – 20 June 2024) was a German singer who was known for Volkstümliche Musik.

== Life and career ==
Hertel had originally wanted to become a farmer after leaving school, but he then chose otherwise. He found that he preferred singing the local Volkslieder (a genre of German folk music), which led him to become a star in East Germany. His musical career began in 1976 at a talent contest called Heitere Premiere ("Cheerful Premiere"). In the 1970s success came his way when he appeared onstage with Hannelore Kalin (b. 1939) as a yodeller. In 1979, both were chosen as East Germany's most successful yodelling duo. Over many years, Hertel was a regular on the Volkstümliche Musik programme Oberhofer Bauernmarkt ("Oberhof Farmers' Market"), which was recorded at the Hotel Panorama in Oberhof (and indeed, the show was named after a series of public events held at that same hotel). He did renditions of a great many well known Saxon folksongs on the programme; in particular, his interpretation of Der Vugelbeerbaam ("The Rowan Tree") with Gerhard Honig's orchestra in 1984 was greatly popular.

After German Reunification, Hertel successfully continued his career, even if he did yield the spotlight ever more often to his daughter Stefanie Hertel, withdrawing somewhat into the background. She had been accompanying him since her appearance in 1985 on Oberhofer Bauernmarkt. Together they sang such songs as Wenn der Vater und die Tochter, Kleine Träume, the Rennsteiglied, folk poet Anton Günther's Feieromd or Christmas songs like 's Raachermannel. In 1996, Hertel, along with his daughter, released the joint single Kleine Fische werden groß ("Little Fish Get Big"), a cover version of Vader Abraham's Als je weggaat, in which he sings about his daughter's early love, and the dread of her leaving her girlhood home. Thereafter, he and she went mostly their separate musical ways, but even so, they sometimes still appeared as a duet act in various television shows until early 2024. Hertel stood on the stage all together more than 60 years and published eleven studio albums.

On 29 November 2008, Hertel marked his 70th birthday at the Adventsfest der 100.000 Lichter ("Advent Festival of the 100,000 Lights") at the Congress Centrum Suhl. Moreover, he produced for MDR Fernsehen the film Papa wird 70 ("Papa Turns 70") by his daughter Stefanie Hertel and Stefan Mross. In 2018, Hertel's eleventh and last studio album, Ich brauch Musik ("I Need Music"), came out, a jubilee album meant to mark his 80th birthday. Hertel was always setting himself to work on charitable goals, and thus he organized in August 2002 a benefit concert for victims of the flooding in Saxony earlier that year. He himself appeared at the concert.

Hertel was married to his wife Elisabeth (1950–2017) until her death. They had four children, among them singer, media presenter and musical theatre performer Stefanie Hertel. He died on 20 June 2024, at the age of 85. On the occasion of his death, the town flag outside the town hall overlooking the marketplace in his hometown, Oelsnitz, was flown at half-mast.

== Honours ==
On 3 December 2008, Hertel was named an honorary citizen of his hometown, Oelsnitz, by the Chief Mayor (Oberbürgermeisterin) of Oelsnitz, Eva-Maria Möbius. The citation reads in part "Through his success throughout Germany and beyond, he has made his hometown famous." It also praises Hertel's benefit work for the town, in particular that done for the town's 650th anniversary in 2006.

== Discography ==
Music albums

- 1997: Lieder wie das Leben
- 1999: Die besten Jahre kommen noch
- 2000: Das Beste der Volksmusik
- 2000: Wenn das kein Grund zum Feiern ist
- 2001: Wir sind alle kleine Sünderlein
- 2002: So schön ist unsere Welt
- 2005: Voll im Leben
- 2007: Auf das Leben, auf die Liebe
- 2008: Danke Freunde – das Jubiläumsalbum zum 70. Geburtstag
- 2012: Wir feiern ab heute das Leben – inkl. 2 Duette mit Tochter Stefanie
- 2018: Ich brauch Musik – das Jubiläumsalbum zum 80. Geburtstag

== Television ==
- 2008: Papa wird 70 (by Stefanie Hertel and Stefan Mross; MDR Fernsehen)
- 2018: Musikgeschichten mit Eberhard Hertel (90-minute MDR programme in which Hertel presents clips of his own and colleagues' appearances from various television programmes, interspersed with stories of his life and career)

Hertel also made many guest appearances on various musical programmes; a selection follows:

- 1983: Zwischen Frühstück und Gänsebraten
- 1987: Ein Kessel Buntes
- 1988: Zwischen Frühstück und Gänsebraten
- 1989: Musikantenstadl
- 1990: Zwischen Frühstück und Gänsebraten
- 1991: Ein Kessel Buntes
- 1996: Das Sommerfest der Volksmusik (from the series Feste der Volksmusik)
- 1997: Das Weihnachtsfest der Volksmusik (from the series Feste der Volksmusik)
- 2004: Zauberhafte Heimat
- 2005: Musikantendampfer
- 2005: Willkommen bei Carmen Nebel
- 2005: Das Hochzeitsfest der Volksmusik (from the series Feste der Volksmusik)
- 2005: Das Adventsfest der Volksmusik (from the series Feste der Volksmusik)
- 2007: Danke Dieter Thomas Heck
- 2008: Das Adventsfest der Volksmusik (from the series Feste der Volksmusik)
- 2009: Musikantenstadl
- 2017: Die große Show der Weihnachtslieder
- 2021: Schlager-Spaß mit Andy Borg
- 2023: Schlager-Spaß mit Andy Borg
- 2023: Zauberhafte Weihnacht im Land der ‚Stillen Nacht‘

He also appeared on some talk shows (selection):

- 1998: MDR Sachsenspiegel
- 2005: Wir in Bayern
- 2005: Zibb
- 2013: MDR Sachsenspiegel
- 2018: Riverboat
- 2019: Riverboat
- 2020: Riverboat
