= Switzerland in the Eurovision Song Contest 1992 =

- Eurovision Song Contest 1992
- Participating broadcaster: Swiss Broadcasting Corporation (SRG SSR)
- Country: Switzerland
- Selection process: Internal selection among Concorso Eurovisione della Canzone 1992 entries
- Announcement date: 13 April 1992

Competing entry
- Song: "Mister Music Man"
- Artist: Daisy Auvray
- Songwriter: Gordon Dent

Placement
- Final result: 15th, 32 points

Participation chronology

Switzerland was represented at the Eurovision Song Contest 1992 with the song "Mister Music Man", written by Gordon Dent, and performed by Daisy Auvray. The Swiss participating broadcaster, the Swiss Broadcasting Corporation (SRG SSR), organised a national final in order to select its entry for the contest. The national final was won by the song "Soleil, soleil" performed by Géraldine Olivier, but it was disqualified later, and the runner-up "Mister Music Man" was internally selected as the Swiss entry for Eurovision.

== Before Eurovision ==
=== Regional selections ===
The Swiss Broadcasting Corporation (SRG SSR) held a national final to select its entry for the Eurovision Song Contest 1992. Each division of SRG SSR — Swiss German and Romansh broadcaster Schweizer Fernsehen der deutschen und rätoromanischen Schweiz (SF DRS), Swiss French broadcaster Télévision suisse romande (TSR), and Swiss Italian broadcaster Televisione Svizzera di lingua italiana (TSI) — used its own method to select its entries for the final. Eligible songs were required to have been composed by songwriters from Switzerland or Liechtenstein.

TSR and SF DRS internally selected their songs, however it is unknown how TSI selected theirs. In total, 142 songs were submitted (with 38 being invalid), of which ten were ultimately selected: three each in French and Italian and four in German.

=== Concorso Eurovisione della Canzone 1992 ===
TSI staged the national final on 23 February 1992 at 20:25 CET at the Palazzo dei Congressi in Lugano. It was hosted by Alessandra Marchese. The national final was broadcast on TSI, TSR (with commentary from Ivan Frésard), and SF. Sandra Simó, who represented Switzerland in 1991, and Richard Clayderman made guest appearances.

Initially, only nine songs were due to compete, however "Soleil, soleil" by Géraldine Olivier was eventually added to the lineup.

Participating entries
Broadcaster	Artist(s)	Song	Songwriter(s)		Language
Broadcaster	Artist(s)	Song	Composer(s)	Lyricist	Language
RTSI	Renato Mascetti	"Non sei piu la mia bambina"	Renato Mascetti		Italian
RTSI	Mary	"Vento da nord"	Mario Robbiani		Italian
RTSI	Mario D'azzo	"Apro le mani"	Mario D'azzo		Italian
SF DRS	Philippe Roussel	"Immer gewinnen kannst du nicht"	Toni Amatoni		German
SF DRS	Guido Bugmann	"Heut' nacht"	Guido Bugmann; Pedro Haldemann	Guido Bugmann	German
SF DRS	Daniel Stein	"Es geht uns alle an"	Bela Balint	Salvatore Ingrassia	German
SF DRS	Géraldine Olivier	"Soleil, soleil"	Peter-Jörg Wassermann	Géraldine Olivier	German
TSR	K. Loren	"Un monde sans musique"	Pierre Collet		French
TSR	Daisy Auvray	"Mister Music Man"	Gordon Dent		French
TSR	Michel Audrey	"Marie-Blanche"	Michel Audrey	Jean-Jacques Egli	French

The voting consisted of regional public votes which were sent to the three divisions of SRG SSR (SF DRS, TSR, TSI: German-Romansh, French, and Italian speaking, respectively), a press jury, and a jury of music experts. The winner was the song "Soleil, soleil", composed by Peter-Jörg Wassermann and written and performed by Géraldine Olivier.

Final – 23 February 1992
R/O	Artist	Song	Regional Juries			Press Jury	Expert Jury	Total	Place
R/O	Artist	Song	DRS	TSI	TSR	Press Jury	Expert Jury	Total	Place
1	Philippe Roussel	"Immer gewinnen kannst du nicht"	6	7	10	8	4	35	4
2	K. Loren	"Un monde sans musique"	3	1	1	6	7	18	7
3	Guido Bugmann	"Heut' nacht"	2	2	2	1	5	12	9
4	Renato Mascetti	"Non sei più la mia bambina"	4	3	4	4	2	17	8
5	Daisy Auvray	"Mister Music Man"	10	10	8	5	12	45	2
6	Daniel Stein	"Es geht uns alle an"	1	4	3	2	1	11	10
7	Mary	"Vento da nord"	5	6	6	10	6	33	5
8	Michel Audrey	"Marie-Blanche"	8	8	5	7	10	38	3
9	Mario D'Azzo	"Apro le mani"	7	5	7	3	8	30	6
10	Géraldine Olivier	"Soleil, soleil"	12	12	12	12	3	51	1

=== Disqualification and replacement ===
On 9 April, it was announced that Géraldine Olivier was disqualified due to her song being submitted in both the TSR (in French, where it was rejected) and SF DRS preselections, which breached a rule regarding song submissions, specifically that songs could not be submitted twice to the regional selections by the same artist. Additionally, the song was also added to the lineup late, even though only nine songs were supposed to compete, with 3 songs per language, and the song was selected for the national final after the submission deadline. Runner-up Daisy Auvray later filed a lawsuit against SRG SSR for the oversight of the breach in rules.

On 13 April, it was announced that Auvray would replace Olivier and represent Switzerland instead with her song "Mister Music Man", as had been speculated in the local press.

== At Eurovision ==
At the Eurovision Song Contest 1992, held at the Malmö Isstadion in Malmö, the Swiss entry was the thirteenth entry of the night following Finland and preceding Luxembourg. The Swiss conductor at the contest was Rody Seidel. At the close of voting, Switzerland had received 32 points in total; finishing in fifteenth place out of twenty-three countries.

=== Voting ===
Each participating broadcaster assembled a jury panel with at least eleven members. The jurors awarded 1-8, 10, and 12 points to their top ten songs.

Points awarded to Switzerland
Score	Country
12 points	Iceland
10 points	Italy
8 points	
7 points	
6 points	
5 points	Belgium
4 points	United Kingdom
3 points	
2 points	
1 point	Ireland

Points awarded by Switzerland
Score	Country
12 points	France
10 points	Greece
8 points	United Kingdom
7 points	Italy
6 points	Ireland
5 points	Malta
4 points	Israel
3 points	Iceland
2 points	Cyprus
1 point	Netherlands
