= Brunner & Brunner =

Band

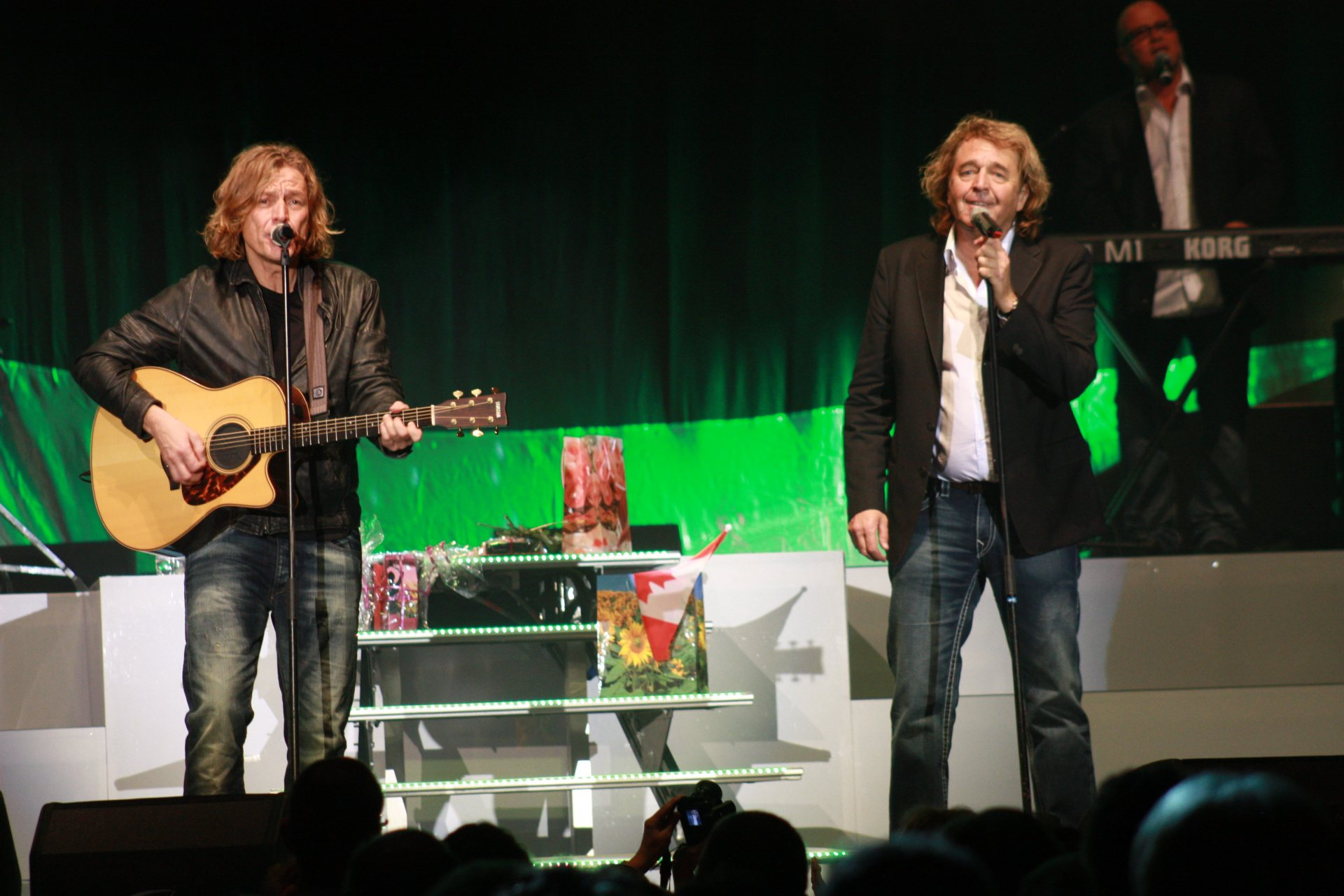

Brunner & Brunner are an Austrian pop duo consisting of brothers Charly Brunner (28 February 1955) and Jogl Brunner (19 March 1958). They had a run of hit singles and albums between 1992 and 2012.
