= Die Paldauer =

Die Paldauer is an Austrian schlager group founded in 1969.
