= Stefanie Hertel =

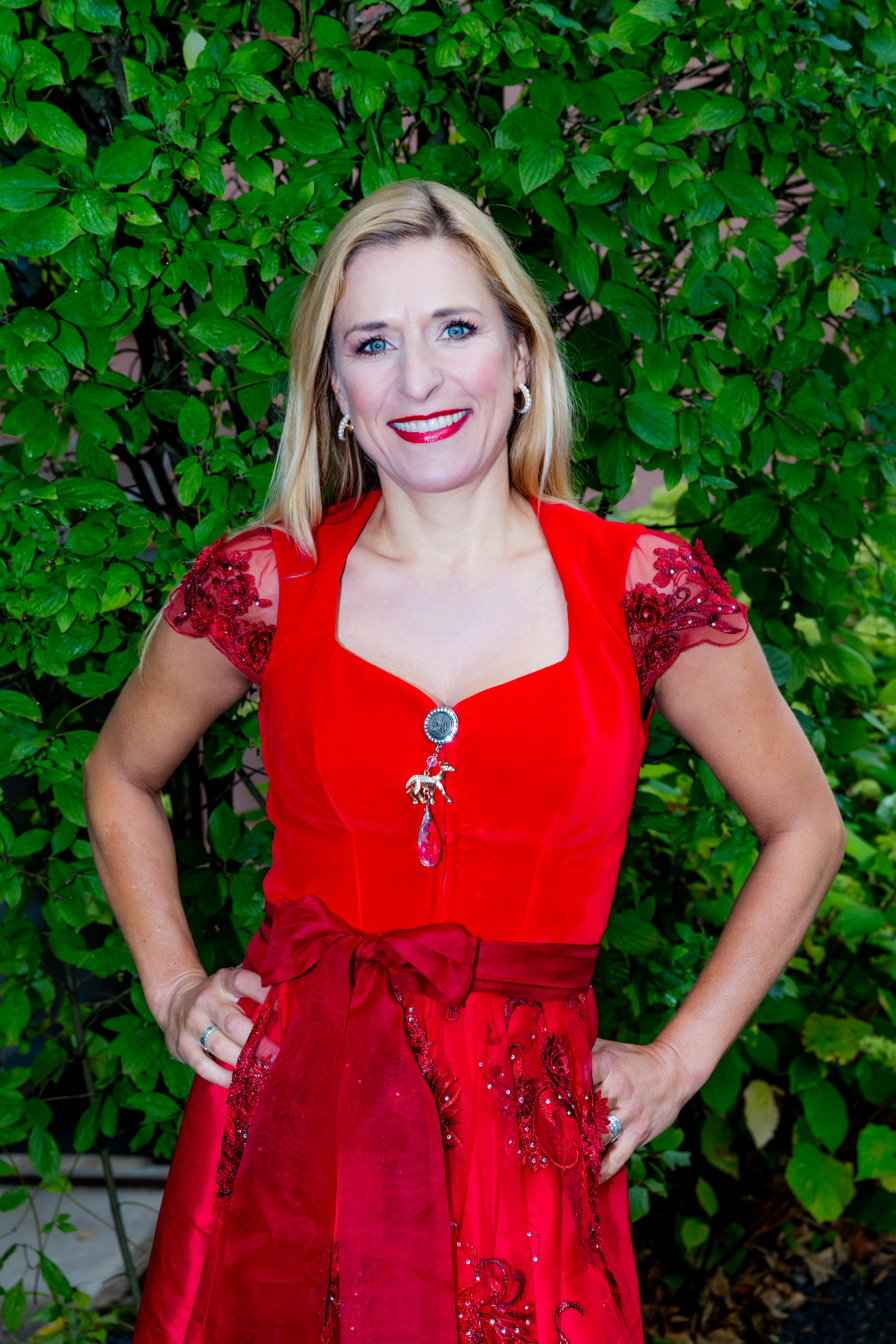
- Hertel in 2025

Background information
- Born: 25 July 1979 (age 47); Oelsnitz, Vogtland, Saxony, GDR
- Website: www.stefaniehertel.de

Stefanie Anke Hertel (born 25 July 1979 in Oelsnitz, Vogtland, Saxony, German Democratic Republic) is a German singer of popular music, popular folk music, schlager music, television presenter, and former yodeler.

Hertel has won numerous prizes as a performer; her career began at the age of four when she appeared with her father Eberhard Hertel. She was six when she made her television debut with a song about a teddy bear, Ich wünsch' mir einen kleinen Teddybär ("I wish for a little teddy bear"). In 1992, she won the Grand Prix der Volksmusik, which trumpeter Stefan Mross had won in 1989 with Heimwehmelodie, with the song Über jedes Bacherl geht a Brückerl, having finished fifth the previous year with So a Stückerl heile Welt. In 1995, she competed together with Stefan Mross in the Grand Prix der Volksmusik with the song Ein Lied für jeden Sonnenstrahl, finishing second.

== Marriages ==
Hertel and Stefan Mross began dating in December 1993 and married on 6 September 2006. They separated in September 2011, and the divorce was finalised on 8 December 2012. They have a daughter together.

On 19 April 2014, she married Austrian musician Leopold "Lanny" Lanner (formerly known professionally as Lanny Isis).
