= Malta in the Eurovision Song Contest 2001 =

- Eurovision Song Contest 2001
- Participating broadcaster: Public Broadcasting Services (PBS)
- Country: Malta
- Selection process: Malta Song for Europe 2001
- Selection date: 3 February 2001

Competing entry
- Song: "Another Summer Night"
- Artist: Fabrizio Faniello
- Songwriters: Paul Abela; Georgina Abela

Placement
- Final result: 9th, 48 points

Participation chronology

Malta was represented at the Eurovision Song Contest 2001 with the song "Another Summer Night", composed by Paul Abela, with lyrics by Georgina Abela, and performed by Fabrizio Faniello. The Maltese participating broadcaster, Public Broadcasting Services (PBS), selected its entry for the contest through the national final Malta Song for Europe 2001. The competition consisted of a final, held on 2 and 3 February 2001, where "Another Summer Night" performed by Fabrizio Faniello eventually emerged as the winning entry after scoring the most points from a seven-member jury and a public televote.

Malta competed in the Eurovision Song Contest which took place on 12 May 2001. Performing during the show in position 21, Malta placed ninth out of the 23 participating countries, scoring 48 points.

== Background ==
Prior to the 2001 contest, the Maltese Broadcasting Authority (MBA) until 1975, and the Public Broadcasting Services (PBS) since 1991, had participated in the Eurovision Song Contest representing Malta 13 times since MBA's first entry in 1971. After competing in 1975, Malta was absent from the contest beginning in 1976. After returning in 1991, it had competed annually. By 2001, its best placing was third and this was achieved on two occasions: in 1992 with the song "Little Child" performed by Mary Spiteri and in 1998 with the song "The One That I Love" performed by Chiara.

As part of its duties as participating broadcaster, PBS organises the selection of its entry in the Eurovision Song Contest and broadcasts the event in the country. The broadcaster had selected its entry consistently through a national final procedure, a method that was continued for its 2001 participation.

== Before Eurovision ==
=== Malta Song for Europe 2001 ===
Malta Song for Europe 2001 was the national final format developed by PBS to select its entry for the Eurovision Song Contest 2001. 229 entries were received by the broadcaster for the competition after artists and composers were able to submit their entries, and sixteen songs were selected by a seven-member jury panel to compete from a shortlist of 36 entries that had progressed through the selection process.

The final took place on 2 and 3 February 2001 at the Mediterranean Conference Centre in the nation's capital city of Valletta, hosted by Louise Tedesco, Claire Fabri and Antonella Vassallo and broadcast on Television Malta (TVM). Sixteen entries competed and the combination of votes from a seven-member jury panel (7/8) and public televoting (1/8) determined the winner. The interval act of the show on 2 February featured guest performances by the Image Dance Group, local act Vanni Pulé, Claudette Pace (who represented Malta in 2000) and the Olsen Brothers (who won Eurovision for Denmark in 2000), while the interval act of the show on 2 February featured further performances by Pace and Olsen Brothers. After the votes from the jury panel and televote were combined, "Another Summer Night" performed by Fabrizio Faniello was the winner. 46,320 votes were registered by the televoting.

Final – 2–3 January 2001
R/O	Artist	Song	Songwriter(s)	Jury	Televote	Total	Place
1	Ira Losco	"We'll Ride the Wind"	Doris Chetcuti, Dominic Galea	41	9	50	11
2	Fiona Cauchi	"All I Need"	Fiona Cauchi, Rene Mamo	54	11	65	8
3	Ira Losco	"Spellbound"	Gerard James Borg, Philip Vella	104	18	122	2
4	Olivia Lewis	"Love Will See Me Through"	Doris Chetcuti, Eugenio Schembri	66	5	71	7
5	Nadine Axisa	"He's My Romeo"	Philip Vella	34	3	37	16
6	Marvic Lewis	"I Wanna Be the One"	Doris Chetcuti, Eugenio Schembri	86	6	92	5
7	Lawrence Gray	"Count on Me"	Philip Vella, Paul Abela	104	12	116	3
8	Karen Polidano	"Nothing I Can Do"	Joe Julian Farrugia, Rene Mamo	45	1	46	13
9	Ira Losco	"Deep Inside My Heart"	Paul Zammit Cutajar, Ira Losco	55	4	59	9
10	Lawrence Gray	"A Song in My Life"	Ray Agius	64	14	78	6
11	Olivia Lewis	"Hold Me Now"	Doris Chetcuti, Eugenio Schembri	50	2	52	10
12	Julie Zahra	"Eternity"	Joe Julian Farrugia, Rene Mamo	39	10	49	12
13	Michelle Farrugia	"Why Now"	Vine Pulo	32	7	39	15
14	Ira Losco	"Don't Give Up"	Ray Agius	77	16	93	4
15	Tarcisio Barbara	"My Three Minute Song"	Alfred C. Sant, Tarcisio Barbara	37	8	45	14
16	Fabrizio Faniello	"Another Summer Night"	Georgina Abela, Paul Abela	134	20	154	1

Detailed Jury Votes
R/O	Song	Jurors							Total
R/O	Song	1	2	3	4	5	6	7	Total
1	"We'll Ride the Wind"	4	2	3	8	4	8	12	41
2	"All I Need"	9	9	16	7	2	7	4	54
3	"Spellbound"	10	18	8	16	16	18	18	104
4	"Love Will See Me Through"	5	12	9	14	10	10	6	66
5	"He's My Romeo"	3	5	7	1	7	4	7	34
6	"I Wanna Be the One"	18	8	20	12	8	6	14	86
7	"Count on Me"	11	16	11	18	18	14	16	104
8	"Nothing I Can Do"	1	4	2	2	11	20	5	45
9	"Deep Inside My Heart"	16	7	14	3	5	2	8	55
10	"A Song in My Life"	12	10	6	10	12	3	11	64
11	"Hold Me Now"	2	11	4	9	9	5	10	50
12	"Eternity"	8	6	1	6	6	9	3	39
13	"Why Now"	7	3	12	5	3	1	1	32
14	"Don't Give Up"	14	14	10	4	14	12	9	77
15	"My Three Minute Song"	6	1	5	11	1	11	2	37
16	"Another Summer Night"	20	20	18	20	20	16	20	134

=== Promotion ===
To promote the Maltese Eurovision entry, Fabrizio Faniello toured Europe, making appearances on television and speaking to the press in Denmark, Germany, Greece, Spain, Sweden, Turkey and the United Kingdom. A music video of "Another Summer Night" was also released prior to the contest.

== At Eurovision ==
The Eurovision Song Contest 2001 took place at Parken Stadium in Copenhagen, Denmark, on 12 May 2001. The relegation rules introduced for the 1997 contest were again utilised ahead of the 2001 contest, based on each country's average points total in previous contests. The 23 participants were made up of the previous year's winning country, the "Big Four" countries, consisting of France, Germany, Spain, and the United Kingdom, the twelve countries which had obtained the highest average points total over the preceding five contests, and any eligible countries which did not compete in the 2000 contest. Malta's five year contest average allowed the nation to continue to participate this year. On the night of the event, Faniello performed for Malta in position 21, and at the close of the voting, the entry placed ninth, having received 48 points.

The contest was broadcast on TVM, and on radio station Radio Malta.

=== Voting ===
Voting during the show involved each country awarding points from 1-8, 10 and 12 as determined by either 100% televoting or a combination of 50% televoting and 50% national jury. In cases where televoting was not possible, only the votes of the eight-member national juries were tabulated. Malta received 48 points, which included the top 12 points from Denmark. The nation awarded its 12 points to contest winners Estonia.

Points awarded to Malta
Score	Country
12 points	Denmark
10 points	
8 points	
7 points	Russia
6 points	
5 points	Norway
4 points	Spain
3 points	Greece; Iceland; Poland; Sweden
2 points	Estonia; Turkey
1 point	Bosnia and Herzegovina; Germany; Lithuania; United Kingdom

Points awarded by Malta
Score	Country
12 points	Estonia
10 points	Croatia
8 points	Sweden
7 points	Greece
6 points	Denmark
5 points	Germany
4 points	Turkey
3 points	United Kingdom
2 points	Russia
1 point	Bosnia and Herzegovina
