= District 12, Malta =

Electoral district in Malta

District 12
- Parliament of Malta constituency
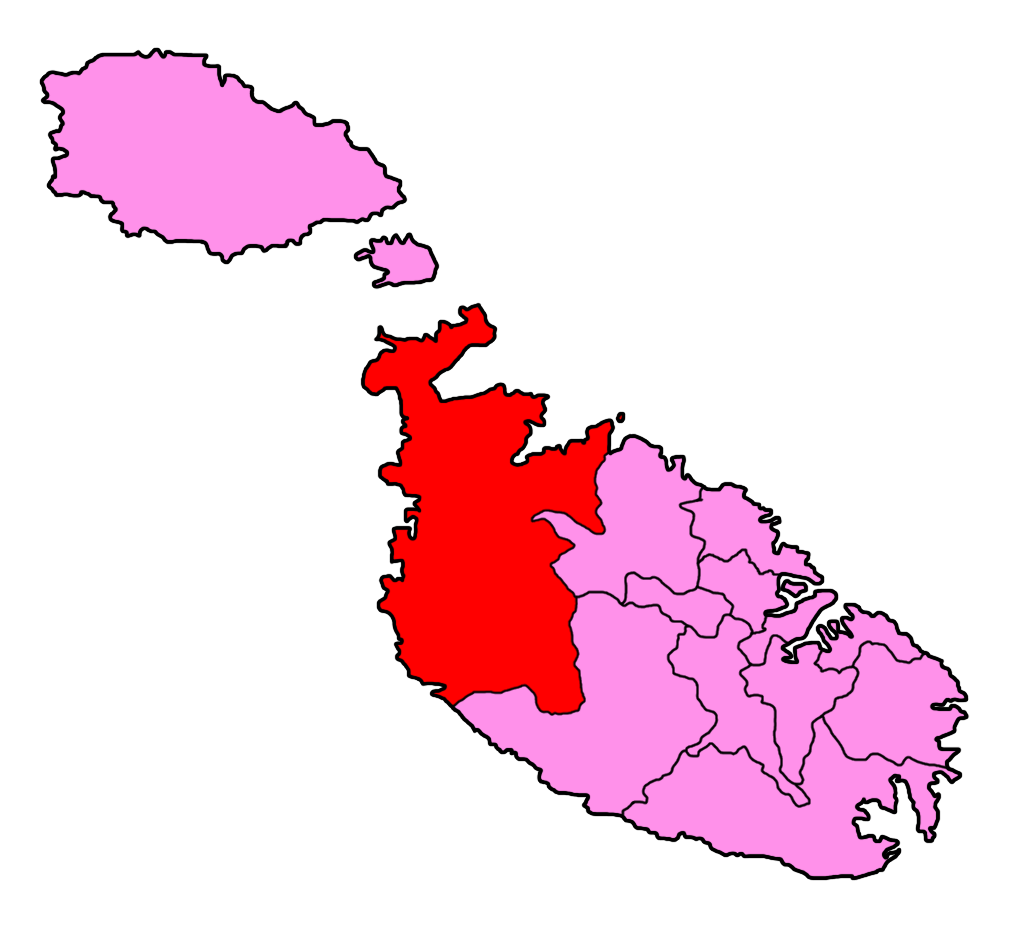
- District within Malta

Current constituency
- Created: 1976
- Seats: 5

District 12 is an electoral district in Malta. It was established in 1976. Its boundaries have changed many times but it currently consists of the localities of Mellieħa, St. Paul's Bay and part of Naxxar.

== Representatives ==
Election	Representatives				
1976	Alfred (Freddie) Micallef (Labour)	Paul Chetcuti Caruana (Labour)	Carm Lino Spiteri (Nationalist)	Lawrence Gatt (Nationalist)	Paulu Borg Olivier (Nationalist)
1981	Alfred (Freddie) Micallef (Labour)	George Gatt (Labour)	Eddie Fenech Adami (Nationalist)	Lawrence Gatt (Nationalist)	Louis Deguara (Nationalist)
1987	Alfred (Freddie) Micallef (Labour)	George Gatt (Labour)	Ċensu Galea (Nationalist)	Lawrence Gatt (Nationalist)	Louis Deguara (Nationalist)
1992	Noel Farrugia (Labour)	George Gatt (Labour)	Ċensu Galea (Nationalist)	Claude Muscat (Nationalist)	Carm Lino Spiteri (Nationalist)
1996	Noel Farrugia (Labour)	Maria Camilleri (Labour)	Ċensu Galea (Nationalist)	Claude Muscat (Nationalist)	Tony Abela (Nationalist)
1998	Noel Farrugia (Labour)	Evarist Bartolo (Labour)	Ċensu Galea (Nationalist)	Claude Muscat (Nationalist)	Tony Abela (Nationalist)
2003	Noel Farrugia (Labour)	Evarist Bartolo (Labour)	Ċensu Galea (Nationalist)	Michael Farrugia (Labour)	Michael Gonzi (Nationalist)
2008	Owen Bonnici (Labour)	Evarist Bartolo (Labour)	Ċensu Galea (Nationalist)	Michael Farrugia (Labour)	Michael Gonzi (Nationalist)
2013	Deborah Schembri (Labour)	Robert Cutajar (Nationalist)	Vincent Galea (Nationalist)	Michael Farrugia (Labour)	Michael Gonzi (Nationalist)
2017	Clayton Bartolo (Labour)	Robert Cutajar (Nationalist)	Simon Busuttil (Nationalist)	Michael Farrugia (Labour)	Claudette Buttigieg (Nationalist)
2022	Clayton Bartolo (Labour)	Robert Cutajar (Nationalist)	Graziella Galea (Nationalist)	Michael Farrugia (Labour)	Ivan Castillo (Nationalist)

== 2017 General Election ==
2017 general election: District 12 - 5 seats
Party	Candidate	FPv%	Count																											
Party	Candidate	FPv%	1	2	3	4	5	6	7	8	9	10	11	12	13	14	15	16	17	18	19	20	21	22	23	24	25	26	27	28
Nationalist	Simon Busuttil	40.1	9389																											
Labour	Michael Farrugia	15.2	3560	3568	3568	3568	3571	3572	3572	3573	3576	3579	3579	3579	3604	3604	3604	3616	3619	3674	3691	3844	3846	3855	3859	4272				
Labour	Evarist Bartolo	10.4	2444	2452	2453	2453	2454	2455	2455	2457	2463	2466	2466	2468	2488	2489	2490	2522	2525	2608	2655	2827	2831	2843	2849	3847	4046			
Labour	Deborah Schembri	10	2331	2336	2338	2338	2338	2338	2338	2338	2351	2352	2353	2353	2399	2400	2404	2414	2418	2501	2527	2739	2741	2742	2746	3094	3266	3410	3417	3417
Labour	Clayton Bartolo	5.4	1261	1267	1267	1268	1268	1268	1268	1269	1271	1273	1273	1273	1285	1285	1286	1299	1300	1345	1732	1814	1818	1822	1825					
Nationalist	Robert Cutajar	4.6	1080	2622	2622	2622	2624	2625	2627	2628	2628	2629	2634	2647	2647	2681	2709	2723	2763	2763	2763	2769	2872	3068	3410	3427	3428	3429	4123	
Labour	Franco Mercieca	2.4	560	561	561	561	561	563	563	563	566	569	569	569	587	587	589	594	594	629	643									
Labour	Matthew Joseph Attard	1.9	436	438	439	439	439	439	440	440	450	454	454	454	469	469	469	475	475	510										
Labour	Alfred Grima	1.4	337	338	338	338	338	340	340	341	343	345	345	345	350	350	350	352	352											
Nationalist	Maria Deguara	1.3	301	865	865	865	866	868	869	869	869	870	878	890	892	909	922	929	963	964	965	966	1016							
Nationalist	Graziella Galea	1.2	284	899	899	901	902	904	910	910	910	917	923	937	938	957	974	981	1021	1025	1025	1026	1096	1257						
Nationalist	Sam Abela	1.2	274	577	577	578	578	581	585	585	585	589	599	618	619	638	678	688	733	734	739	740								
Democratic Alternative (Malta)	Luke Caruana	0.6	149	164	164	164	164	169	171	218	221	237	239	241	241	241	261													
Labour	Kenneth Spiteri	0.6	130	131	131	131	131	131	132	132	147	149	149	149																
Nationalist	David Thake	0.5	126	995	995	995	996	996	1006	1009	1009	1009	1051	1065	1066	1079	1089	1101	1200	1200	1202	1202	1271	1454	1858	1863	1863	1864		
Nationalist	Claudette Buttigieg	0.5	125	1119	1119	1119	1119	1120	1125	1126	1127	1128	1136	1161	1161	1186	1235	1249	1312	1312	1312	1313	1715	2124	2567	2573	2574	2575	3645	
Nationalist	Duncan Bonnici	0.4	98	159	159	159	159	159	160	160	160	161	171	184	184	200														
Nationalist	Fenech Muscat	0.3	70	302	302	302	302	304	308	308	308	308	320	323	323	330	339	343												
Moviment Patrijotti Maltin	Anthony Calleja	0.3	69	73	76	77	96	100	100	101	102																			
Labour	Fleur Vella	0.3	61	61	61	61	61	61	61	61																				
Nationalist	Simone Aquilina	0.2	58	122	122	122	122	122	124	124	124	126	135																	
Nationalist	Mark Azzopardi	0.2	55	138	138	138	138	138	142	142	142	143	143	158	158															
Democratic Alternative (Malta)	Simon Galea	0.2	50	58	58	58	58	59	59																					
Nationalist	Salvu Mallia	0.2	39	114	114	114	114	114	114	114	114	116																		
Moviment Patrijotti Maltin	Fatima Hassanin	0.1	28	31	31	31																								
Alleanza Bidla	Ivan Grech Mintoff	0.1	23	25	25	39	41																							
Nationalist	Edward Torpiano	0.1	22	44	44	44	44	45																						
Alleanza Bidla	Joseph Giardina	0.1	19	20	20																									
Independent	Joseph Aquilina	0	11	12																										
Electorate: 27,076 Valid: 23,390 Spoilt: 389 Quota: 3,899 Turnout: 23,779 (87.8%)
