= Graziella Galea =

Maltese politician and architect

Honourable Graziella Galea MP

Member of Parliament
- Incumbent
- Assumed office 24 January 2022
- Constituency: Twelfth District

Mayor of San Pawl il-Baħar
- In office 2008–2012
- Preceded by: Paul Bugeja
- Succeeded by: Mario Salerno
- In office 2015–2018
- Preceded by: Raymond Tabone
- Succeeded by: Anne Fenech

Personal details
- Party: Nationalist Party
- Spouse: Clayton Tanti Gregoraci (m. 2017)
- Relatives: Ċensu Galea (father)
- Education: University of Malta
- Occupation: Politician; architect

Graziella Galea MP is a Maltese politician and architect from the Nationalist Party. She was elected to the Parliament of Malta in the 2022 Maltese general election from Twelfth District. She had been co-opted in the previous session.

She served as mayor of San Pawl il-Baħar in 2008–2012 and 2015–2018.

== See also ==
- List of members of the parliament of Malta, 2022–2027
