= Malta in the Eurovision Song Contest =

- Eurovision Song Contest
- Participating broadcaster: Public Broadcasting Services (PBS; 1991–present) Formerly: Maltese Broadcasting Authority (MBA; 1971–1975)

Participation summary
- Appearances: 38 (28 finals)
- First appearance: 1971
- Highest placement: 2nd: 2002, 2005
- Participation history: 1971; 1972; ~~1973~~; 1974; 1975; 1976 – 1990; 1991; 1992; 1993; 1994; 1995; 1996; 1997; 1998; 1999; 2000; 2001; 2002; 2003; 2004; 2005; 2006; 2007; 2008; 2009; 2010; 2011; 2012; 2013; 2014; 2015; 2016; 2017; 2018; 2019; ~~2020~~; 2021; 2022; 2023; 2024; 2025; 2026

Related articles
- X Factor Malta

External links
- PBS official page
- Malta's page at Eurovision.com
- For the most recent participation see Malta in the Eurovision Song Contest 2026

Malta has been represented at the Eurovision Song Contest 38 times since its debut in 1971. The current Maltese participating broadcaster in the contest is the Public Broadcasting Services (PBS). Malta has yet to win the contest, but is the only non-winning country to have achieved four top three results. Malta holds the most participations in Eurovision without a win, after Cyprus.

Malta finished last on its first two attempts in 1971 and 1972, and had a 16-year absence from the contest between 1975 and 1991, when it returned. Malta has participated every year since. Malta's return proved more successful, reaching the top 10 in 12 out of 15 contests from 1991 to 2005, including third-place results with "Little Child" performed by Mary Spiteri (1992) and "The One That I Love" by Chiara (1998) and second-place results with "7th Wonder" by Ira Losco (2002) and "Angel" by Chiara (2005). Since finishing last for the third time in 2006, Malta has struggled to make an impact, having achieved only two top 10 results in recent years: first being an eighth-place with "Tomorrow" by Gianluca Bezzina in 2013, and a seventh-place with "Je me casse" by Destiny Chukunyere in 2021.

== History ==
Malta first participated at the Eurovision Song Contest in 1971, although its history with the contest dates farther back. The Maltese Broadcasting Authority (MBA) gained associate European Broadcasting Union (EBU) membership on 1 January 1964 and it wrote a letter to the EBU enquiring about if it could participate as an associate member, but received no response. However, MBA still broadcast the 1964 contest. The MBA once again wrote to the EBU in 1965 asking if it could participate. This time the EBU responded but did not allow the MBA to participate in the contest as an associate member. On 1 January 1970, the MBA became an active member of the EBU and participation in the Eurovision Song Contest was possible for the first time. The MBA once again wrote to the EBU enquiring about its participation, but were informed that "Since arrangements for the contest were already in an advanced stage" they could not participate.

The MBA successfully participated at the contest for the first time in 1971. The format for Malta's national finals in the 70s consisted of the Malta Song Festival, which had been held annually in the country since 1960, acting as a semi-final with the highest placing songs going to the Song For Europe contest, where the winner would be chosen by a combination of jury and public votes. Malta's first entry to Eurovision was "Marija l-Maltija" performed by Joe Grech. It scored 52 points and finished last out of 18 countries. Malta participated again in 1972 with "L-imħabba" by Helen & Joseph. It scored 48 points and Malta came last for the second year in a row. The MBA had originally planned to participate in 1973 but due to complications behind their national final where the MBA deemed the participating songs to be "below the European standard", it withdrew as they feared getting last for a third year in a row. Malta never applied for the 1974 contest as they feared getting another low result. Malta returned in 1975 and participated with the song "Singing This Song" by Renato. They scored 32 points and came 12th out of 19 countries. This was considered a success for Malta and enthusiasm for the contest in the Maltese music industry increased drastically. On 11 September 1975, the MBA announced their intention to participate in the 1976 contest and opened song submissions for their national final which closed on 15 October. However on 4 November, the MBA announced their withdrawal from the contest, citing that the participation fee had been drastically increased and Malta could not afford to participate. In a statement released on 20 November, the MBA said that it felt it was "Under no obligation to take part in the Eurovision Song Contest year after year" and Malta did not participate in the contest again until 1991.

Malta's return to the contest by the Public Broadcasting Services (PBS) in 1991, after a 16-year absence, proved to be more successful, with eight consecutive top 10 placings (1991–1998) and finishing in the top 10 in 12 out of 15 contests from 1991 to 2005. These results included third-place finishes in 1992 for Mary Spiteri and in 1998 for Chiara and second-place finishes in 2002 for Ira Losco and in 2005 for Chiara, who in 2009 became the first performer to represent Malta at three contests, finishing 22nd. Malta's two second-places and two third-places make it the most successful country not to win the contest.

In the last 15 contests, Malta has only reached the top 10 twice, with Gianluca Bezzina finishing eighth in 2013, and Destiny Chukunyere finishing seventh in 2021. Fabrizio Faniello, who had previously finished ninth in 2001, finished last in the 2006 final, and since then the country has failed to qualify from the semi-final round ten times, in 2007, 2008, 2010, 2011, 2015, 2017, 2018, 2022, 2023, and 2024; of these non-qualification, it finished bottom 3 in the semi-final in 2017 and 2022, and last place in 2023 and 2024.

Malta is one of the few countries that has not missed a contest since 1991, together with France, Sweden, and the United Kingdom. All of Malta's entries between 1975 and 2025 have been sung fully in its other official language, English, which it was one of the few countries allowed to use in the contest between 1977 and 1999, being a former British colony which (as seen below) has had a close relationship with the UK within the contest. The only use of the Maltese language during this period was three lines in the 2000 entry "Desire" by Claudette Pace. It was not until 2026 that the Maltese language finally returned as it was partially used in the country’s entry, "Bella" by Aidan. Also, along with Croatia and Sweden it was the only country never to be relegated, under the previous rules of the contest, that was not a part of the "Big Four".

== Selection process ==
Malta uses a televised national final to select its entry. From its debut in 1971 through 1976, Malta Song Festival, an existing song festival that had been created in 1960 was used to select the entrant, with the winner going to represent the country at the Eurovision Song Contest. Malta did not participate in the contest between 1977 and 1990. Since its return in 1991, national finals under various names were held to select the entry, including Malta Song for Europe (Maltese: il-Festival Kanzunetta għall-Ewropa), Malta Eurovision Song Contest, and Malta Eurosong. During this time period, the organization of the event was taken over by the PBS.

A typical Maltese national final would consist of: the rules for submissions by composers, authors, and singers being published in October, first elimination rounds in December, and semi-finalists announced in January. The semi-final would then be held in February, followed two days later by a final to choose Malta's representative at the contest. In 2009, a new format of the contest was introduced, the Malta Eurosong contest, with eight semi-finals held over November 2008 to January 2009, and a final of 20 songs competing in February. In 2010 six semi-finals were held over December 2009 and January 2010, and a final was once again held in February 2010. This format was discontinued for the 2019 and 2020 contests, with PBS instead using X Factor Malta to select the artist. The national final format returned for the 2022 contest with a mixed voting system combining judges votes, as well as audience votes.

== Participation overview ==
Table key
1	First place
2	Second place
3	Third place
◁	Last place
◇	Entry selected but did not compete
†	Upcoming event

Year	Artist	Song	Language	Final	Points	Semi	Points
1971	Joe Grech	"Marija l-Maltija"	Maltese	18 ◁	52	No semi-finals	
1972	Helen and Joseph	"L-imħabba"	Maltese	18 ◁	48	No semi-finals	
1975	Renato	"Singing This Song"	English	12	32	No semi-finals	
1991	Paul Giordimaina and Georgina	"Could It Be"	English	6	106	No semi-finals	
1992	Mary Spiteri	"Little Child"	English	3	123	No semi-finals	
1993	William Mangion	"This Time"	English	8	69	Kvalifikacija za Millstreet	
1994	Moira Stafrace and Christopher Scicluna	"More Than Love"	English	5	97	No semi-finals	
1995	Mike Spiteri	"Keep Me in Mind"	English	10	76	No semi-finals	
1996	Miriam Christine	"In a Woman's Heart"	English	10	68	4	138
1997	Debbie Scerri	"Let Me Fly"	English	9	66	No semi-finals	
1998	Chiara	"The One That I Love"	English	3	165	No semi-finals	
1999	Times Three	"Believe 'n Peace"	English	15	32	No semi-finals	
2000	Claudette Pace	"Desire"	English (Note: Contains spoken-word phrases in Maltese.)	8	73	No semi-finals	
2001	Fabrizio Faniello	"Another Summer Night"	English	9	48	No semi-finals	
2002	Ira Losco	"7th Wonder"	English	2	164	No semi-finals	
2003	Lynn Chircop	"To Dream Again"	English	25	4	No semi-finals	
2004	Julie and Ludwig	"On Again... Off Again"	English	12	50	8	74
2005	Chiara	"Angel"	English	2	192	Top 12 in 2004 final (Note: According to the then-Eurovision rules, the top ten non-Big Four countries from the previous year along with the Big Four automatically qualified for the Grand Final without having to compete in semi-finals. For example, if Germany and France placed inside the top ten, the 11th and 12th spots were advanced to next year's Grand Final along with all countries ranked in the top ten.)	
2006	Fabrizio Faniello	"I Do"	English	24 ◁	1	Top 11 in 2005 final	
2007	Olivia Lewis	"Vertigo"	English	Failed to qualify		25	15
2008	Morena	"Vodka"	English	Failed to qualify		14	38
2009	Chiara	"What If We"	English	22	31	6	86
2010	Thea Garrett	"My Dream"	English	Failed to qualify		12	45
2011	Glen Vella	"One Life"	English	Failed to qualify		11	54
2012	Kurt Calleja	"This Is the Night"	English	21	41	7	70
2013	Gianluca	"Tomorrow"	English	8	120	4	118
2014	Firelight	"Coming Home"	English	23	32	9	63
2015	Amber	"Warrior"	English	Failed to qualify		11	43
2016	Ira Losco	"Walk on Water"	English	12	153	3	209
2017	Claudia Faniello	"Breathlessly"	English	Failed to qualify		16	55
2018	Christabelle	"Taboo"	English	Failed to qualify		13	101
2019	Michela	"Chameleon"	English	14	107	8	157
2020	Destiny ◇	"All of My Love" ◇	English ◇	Contest cancelled (Note: The 2020 contest was cancelled due to the COVID-19 pandemic.)			
2021	Destiny	"Je me casse"	English	7	255	1	325
2022	Emma Muscat	"I Am What I Am"	English	Failed to qualify		16	47
2023	The Busker	"Dance (Our Own Party)"	English	Failed to qualify		15 ◁	3
2024	Sarah Bonnici	"Loop"	English	Failed to qualify		16 ◁	13
2025	Miriana Conte	"Serving"	English	17	91	9	53
2026	Aidan	"Bella"	English, Maltese	18	89	8	143
2027	Confirmed intention to participate †						

== Awards ==
=== Marcel Bezençon Awards ===
Year	Category	Song	Performer	Final	Points	Host city	Ref.
2005	Press Award	"Angel"	Chiara	2	192	(Ukraine) Kyiv	

=== Winner by OGAE members ===
Year	Song	Performer	Final result	Points	Host city	Ref.
2021	"Je me casse"	Destiny	7	255	(Netherlands) Rotterdam	

=== Barbara Dex Award ===
Year	Performer	Host city	Ref.
1997	Debbie Scerri	(Republic of Ireland) Dublin	

== Related involvement ==
=== Commentators and spokespersons ===
All shows are broadcast live on Television Malta (TVM) and Radio Malta.

Year	Television channel	Radio channel	Commentator	Spokesperson	Ref.
1964	MTV	No radio broadcast	Victor Aquilina	Did not participate	
1965	MTV	No radio broadcast	Victor Aquilina	Did not participate	
1968	MTS	No radio broadcast	Unknown	Did not participate	
1969	MTS	No radio broadcast	Victor Aquilina	Did not participate	
1970	MTS	No radio broadcast	Victor Aquilina	Did not participate	
1971	MTS	National Network	Victor Aquilina	No spokesperson	
1972	MTS	National Network	Norman Hamilton	No spokesperson	
1973	MTS	National Network	Victor Aquilina	Did not participate	
1974	No broadcast	National Network	Victor Aquilina	Did not participate	
1975	TVM	Radio Malta	Norman Hamilton	Unknown	
1976–1990	No broadcast			Did not participate	
1991	TVM	No radio broadcast	Unknown	Dominic Micallef	
1992	TVM	Radio Malta 2	Anna Bonanno	Anna Bonanno	
1993	TVM	No radio broadcast	Unknown	Kevin Drake	
1994	TVM	No radio broadcast	Unknown	John Demanuele	
1995	TVM	No radio broadcast	Unknown	Stephanie Farrugia	
1996	TVM	No radio broadcast	Charles Saliba	Ruth Amaira	
1997	TVM	No radio broadcast	Unknown	Anna Bonanno	
1998	TVM	No radio broadcast	Unknown	Stephanie Spiteri	
1999	TVM	No radio broadcast	Unknown	Nirvana Azzopardi	
2000	TVM	No radio broadcast	Unknown	Valerie Vella	
2001	TVM	Radio Malta	Unknown	Marbeck Spiteri	
2002	TVM	No radio broadcast	John Bundy	Yvette Portelli	
2003	TVM	No radio broadcast	John Bundy	Sharon Borg	
2004	TVM	No radio broadcast	Eileen Montesin	Claire Agius	
2005	TVM	No radio broadcast	Eileen Montesin	Valerie Vella	
2006	TVM	No radio broadcast	Eileen Montesin	Moira Delia	
2007	TVM	No radio broadcast	Antonia Micallef	Mireille Bonello	
2008	TVM	No radio broadcast	Eileen Montesin	Moira Delia	
2009	TVM	No radio broadcast	Valerie Vella	Pauline Agius	
2010	TVM	No radio broadcast	Valerie Vella	Chiara Siracusa	
2011	TVM	No radio broadcast	Eileen Montesin	Kelly Schembri	
2012	TVM	No radio broadcast	Elaine Saliba and Ronald Briffa	Keith Demicoli	
2013	TVM	No radio broadcast	Gordon Bonello and Rodney Gauci	Emma Hickey	
2014	TVM	No radio broadcast	Carlo Borg Bonaci	Valentina Rossi	
2015	TVM	No radio broadcast	Corazon Mizzi	Julie Zahra	
2016	TVM	No radio broadcast	Arthur Caruana	Ben Camille	
2017	TVM	No radio broadcast	No commentary	Martha Fenech	
2018	TVM	No radio broadcast	No commentary	Lara Azzopardi	
2019	TVM	No radio broadcast	No commentary	Ben Camille	
2020	Not announced before cancellation				
2021	TVM	No radio broadcast	No commentary	Stephanie Spiteri	
2022	TVM	No radio broadcast	No commentary	Aidan Cassar	
2023	TVM	No radio broadcast	No commentary	Ryan Hili	
2024	TVM	No radio broadcast	No commentary	Matt Blxck	
2025	TVM	No radio broadcast	No commentary	Ingrid Sammut	
2026	TVM	No radio broadcast	No commentary	Mya Scicluna	

== Photo gallery ==
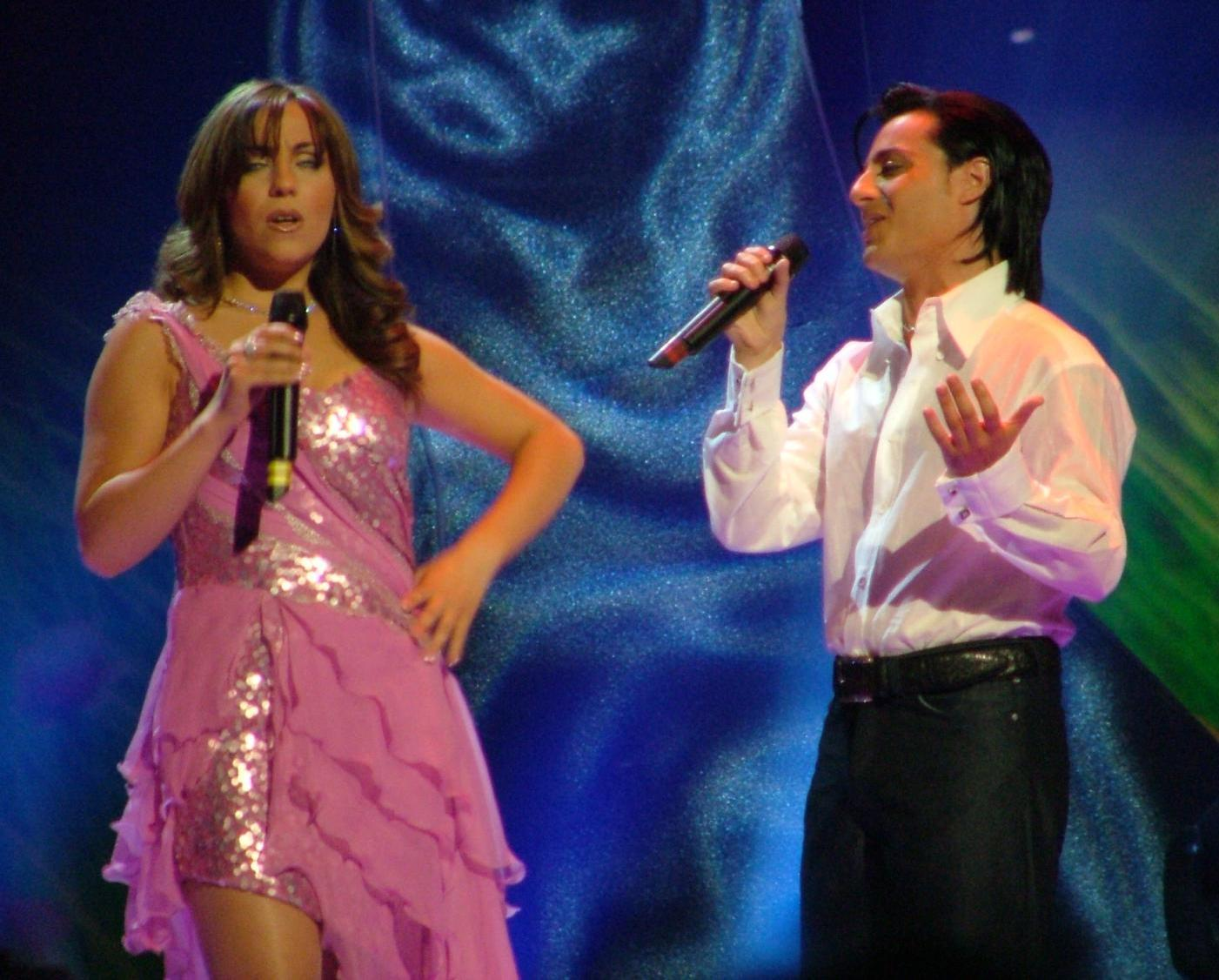
Julie and Ludwig in Istanbul (2004)

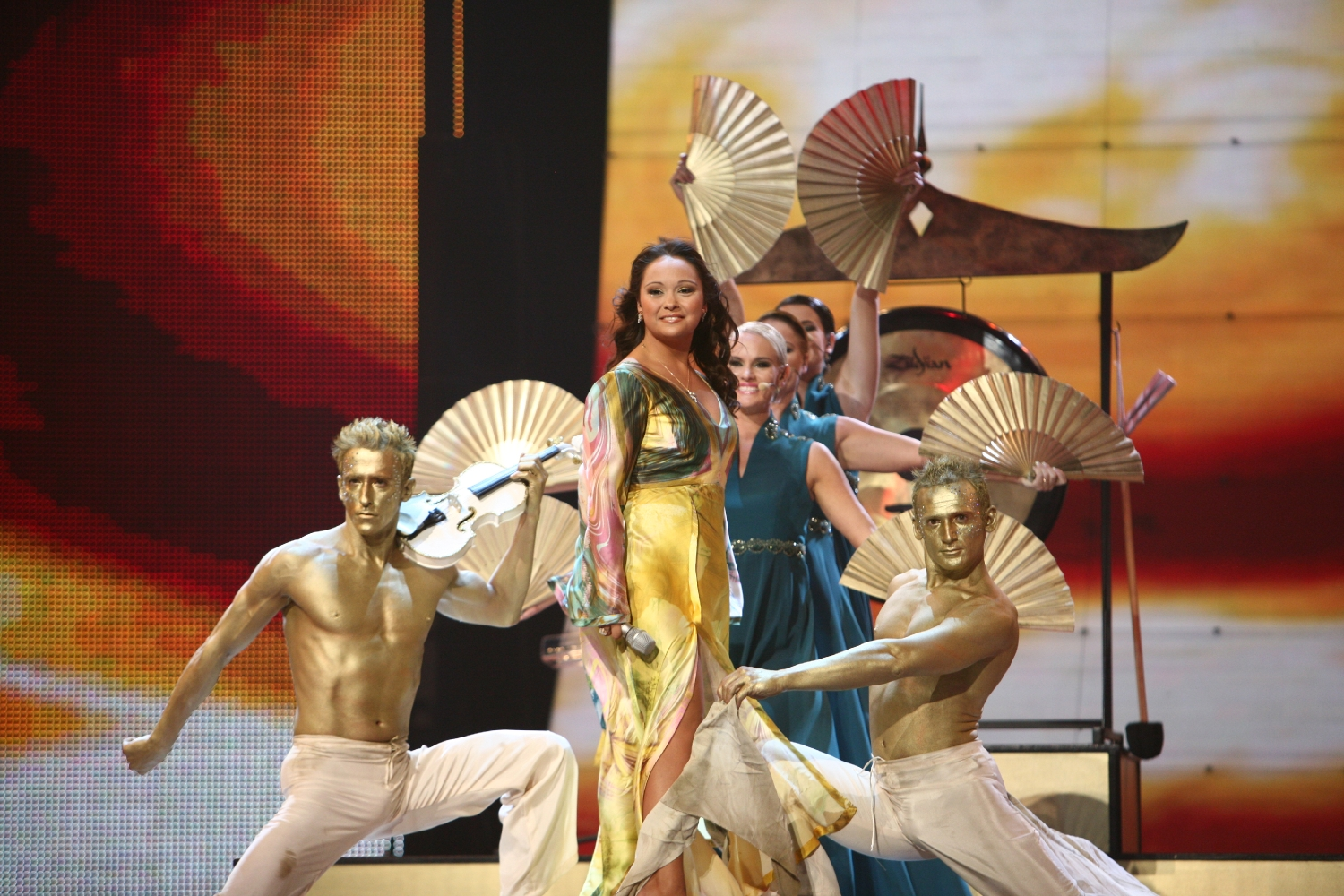
Olivia Lewis in Helsinki (2007)

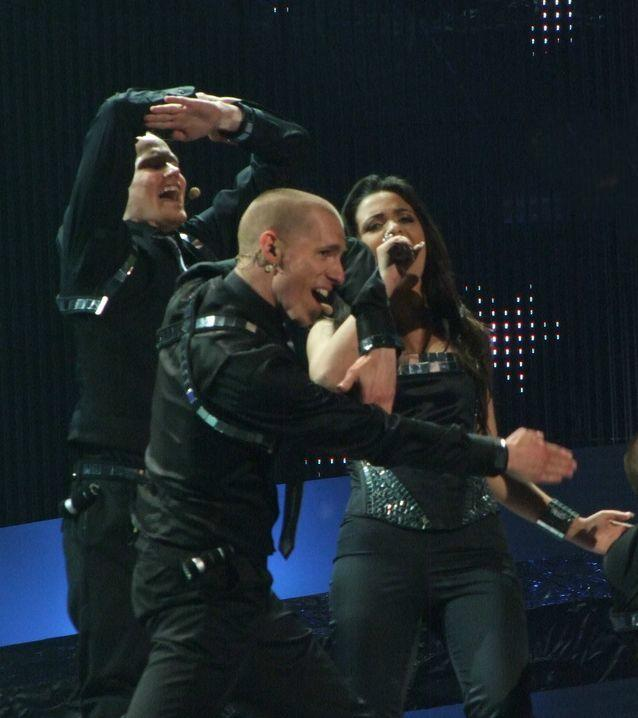
Morena in Belgrade (2008)

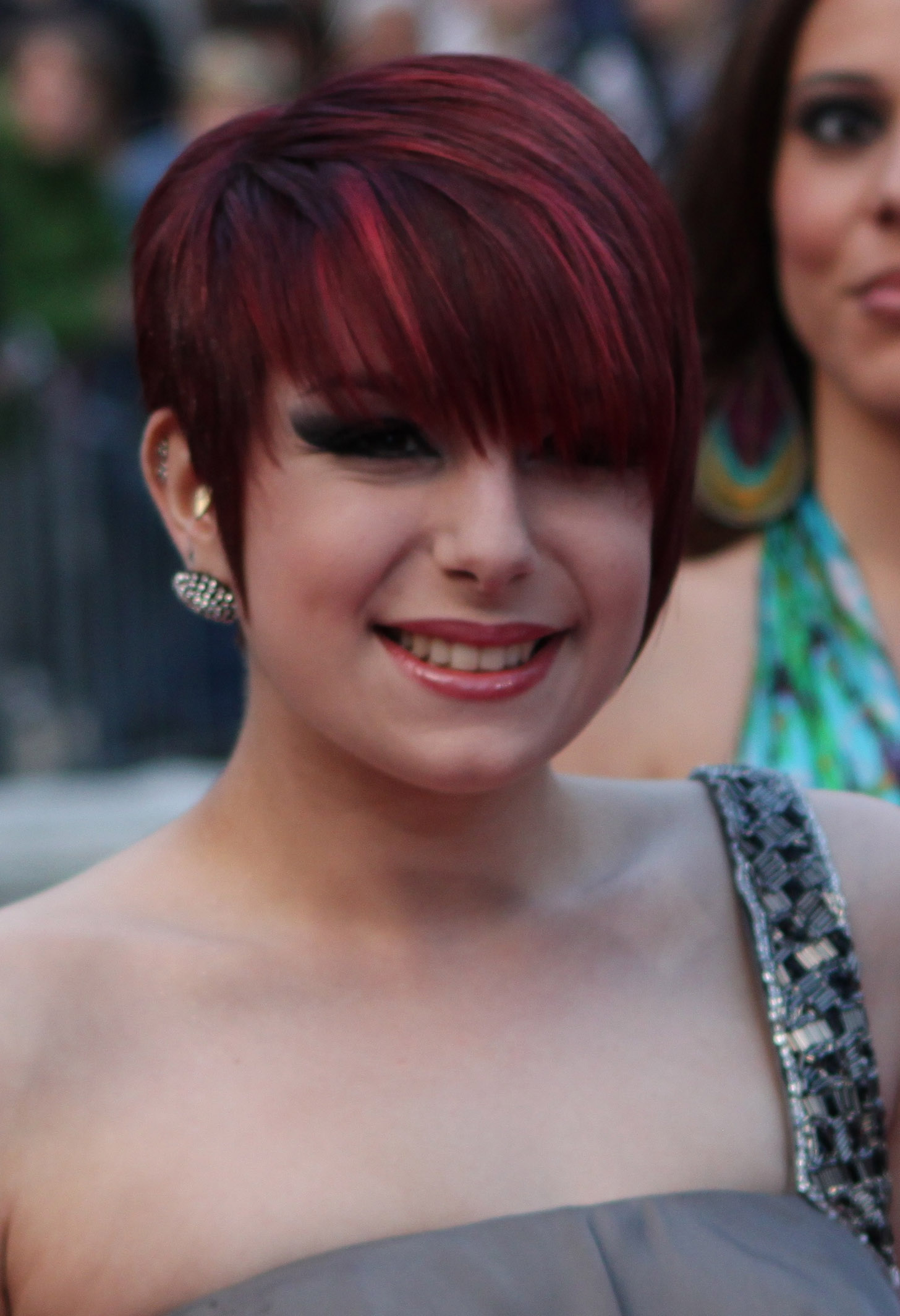
Thea Garrett in Oslo (2010)

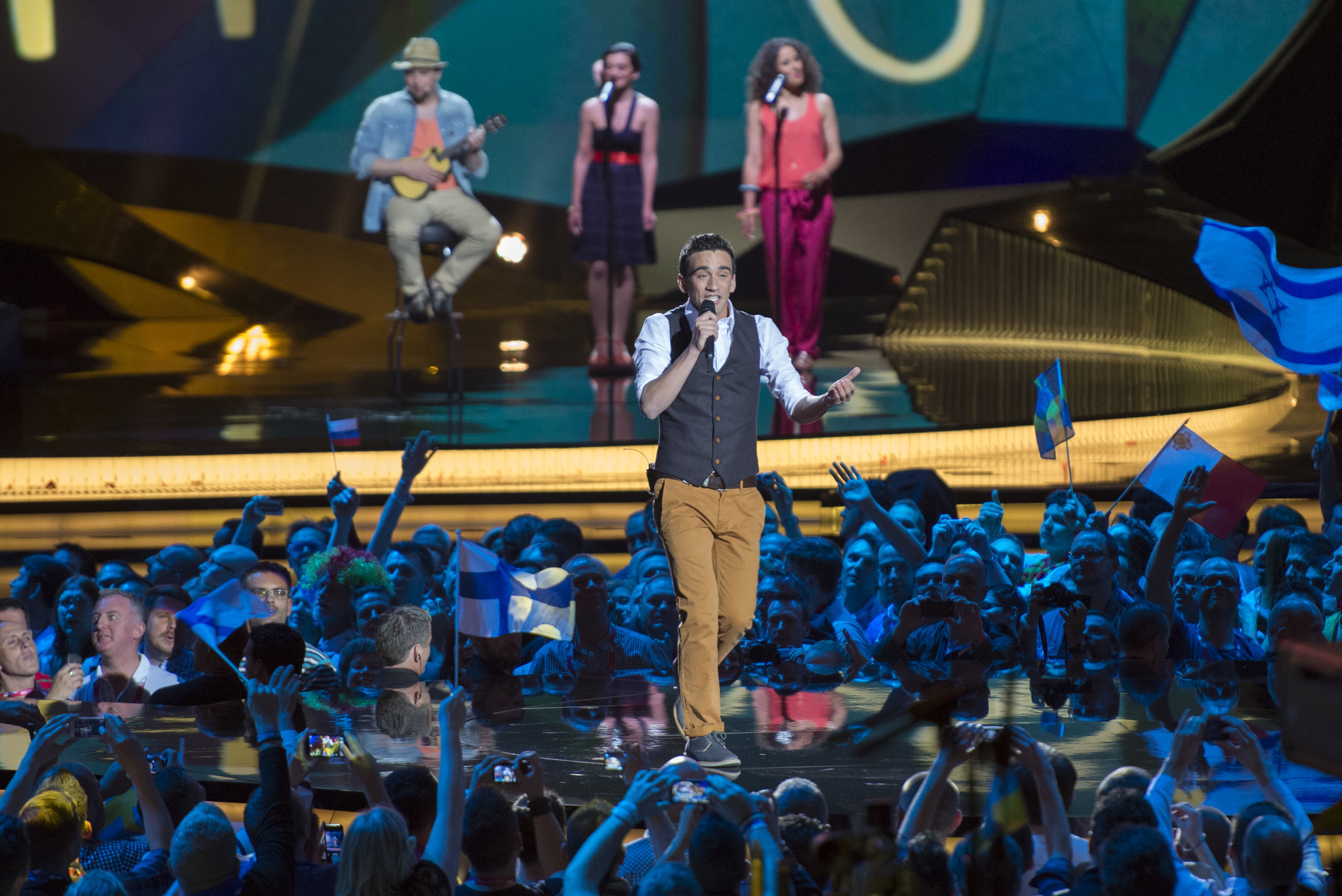
Gianluca Bezzina in Malmö (2013)

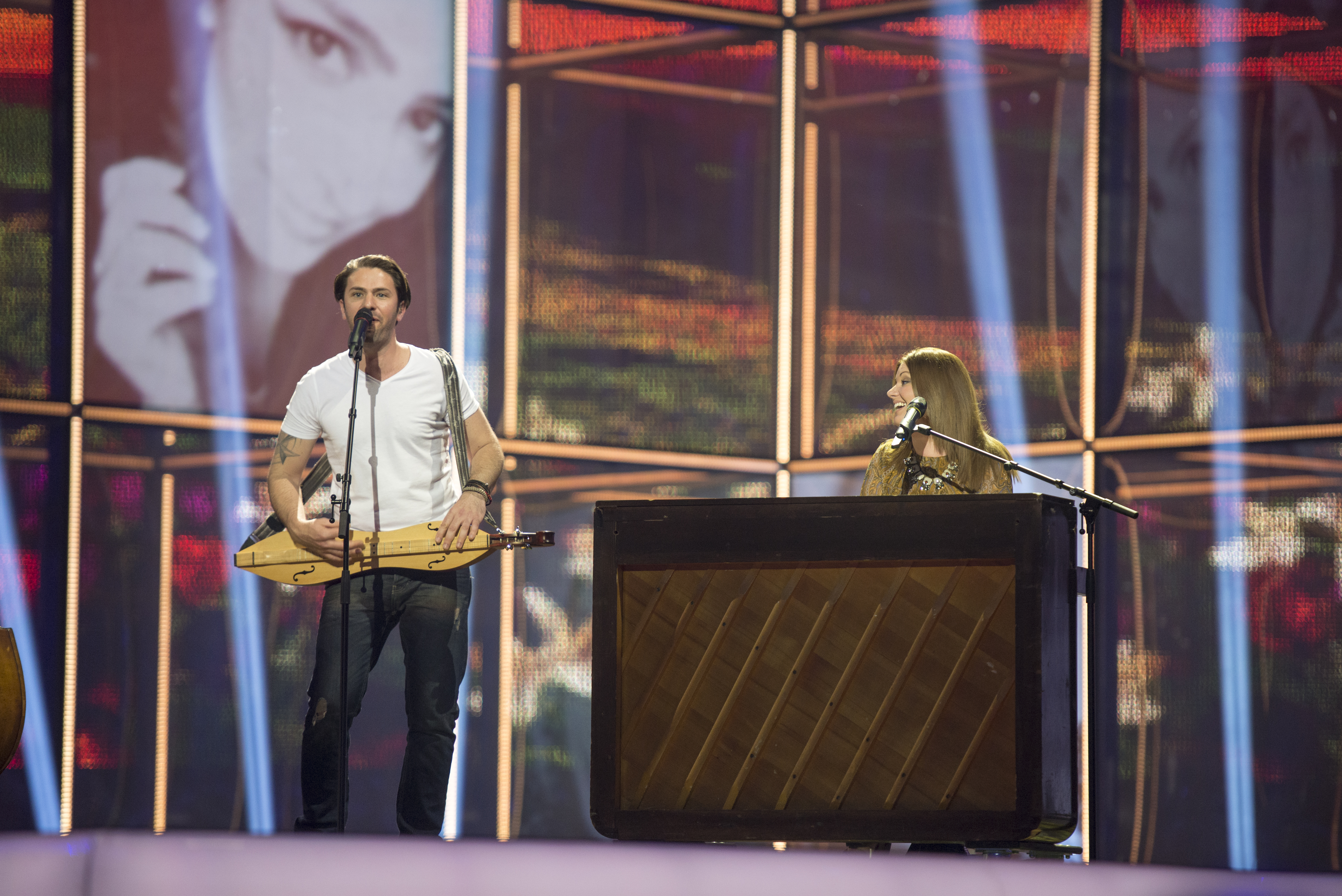
Firelight in Copenhagen (2014)

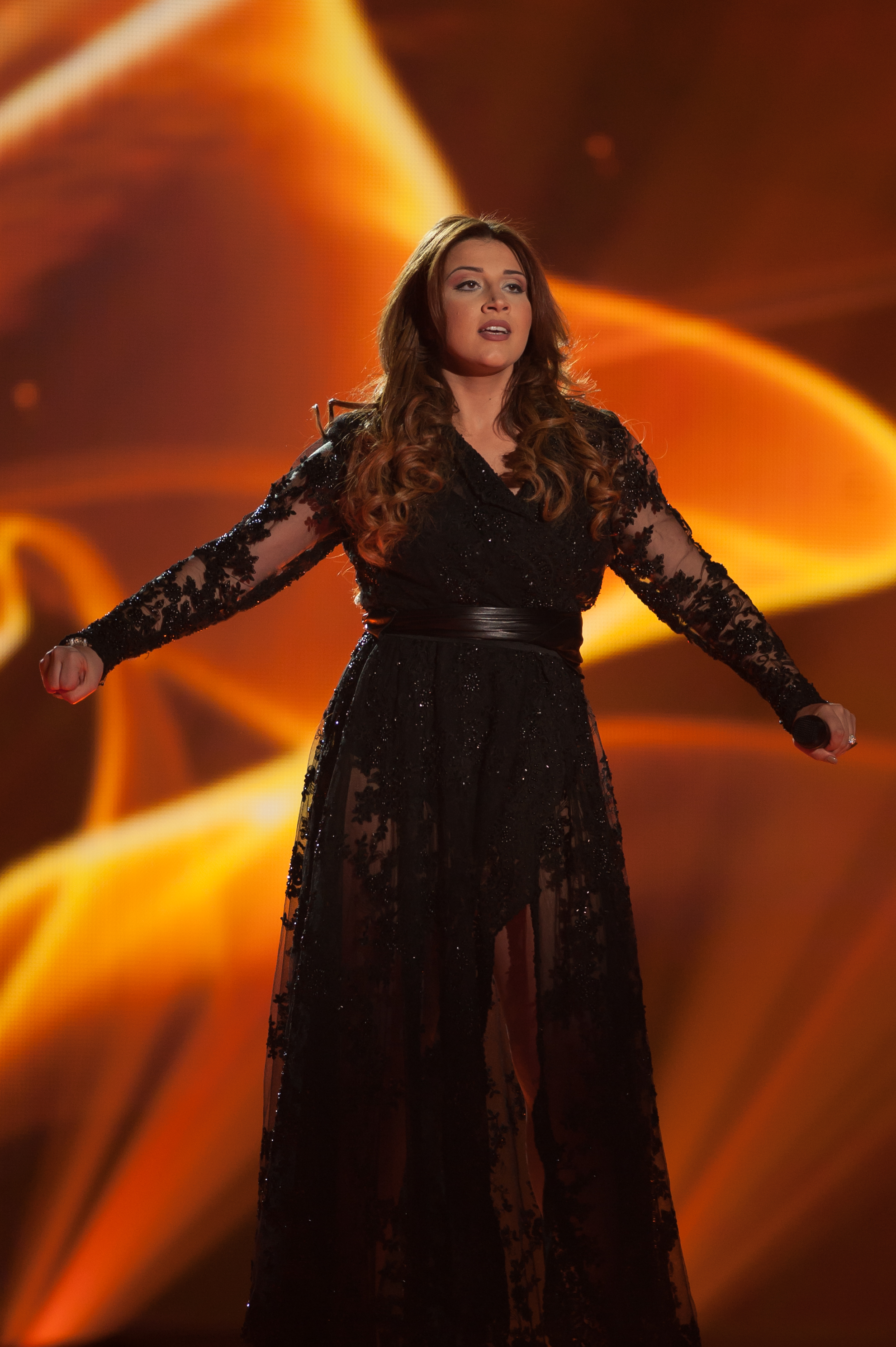
Amber in Vienna (2015)

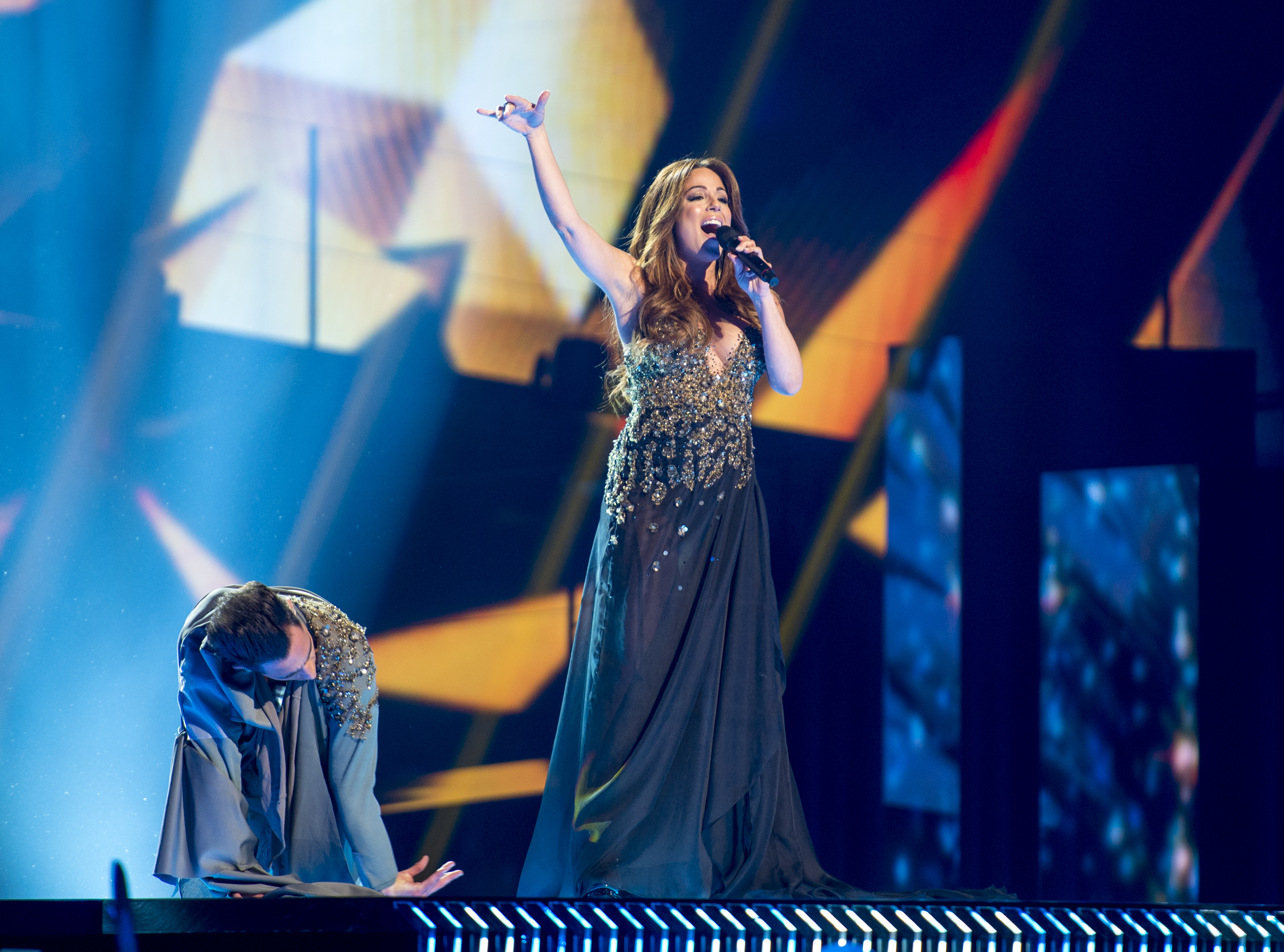
Ira Losco in Stockholm (2016)

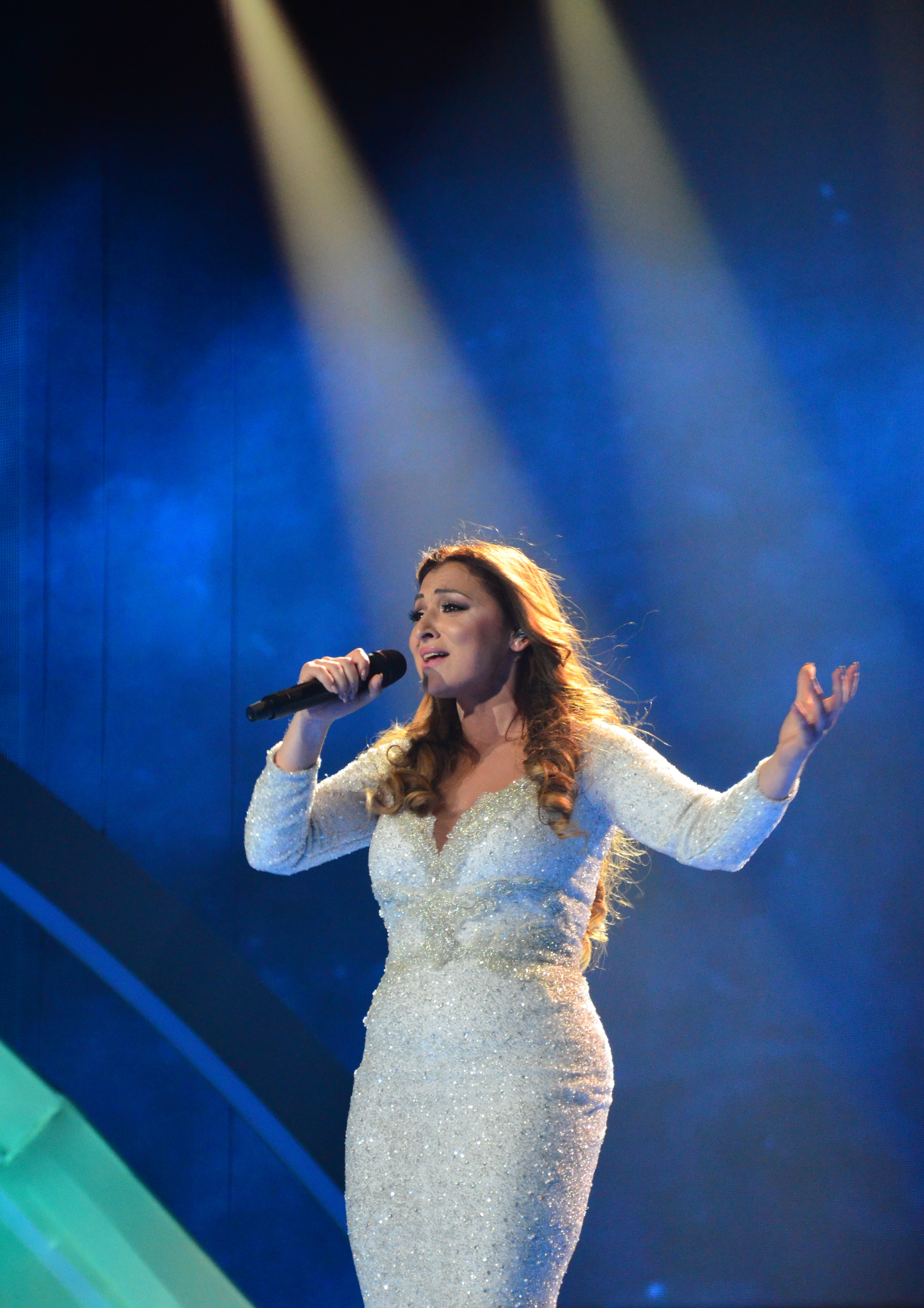
Claudia Faniello in Kyiv (2017)

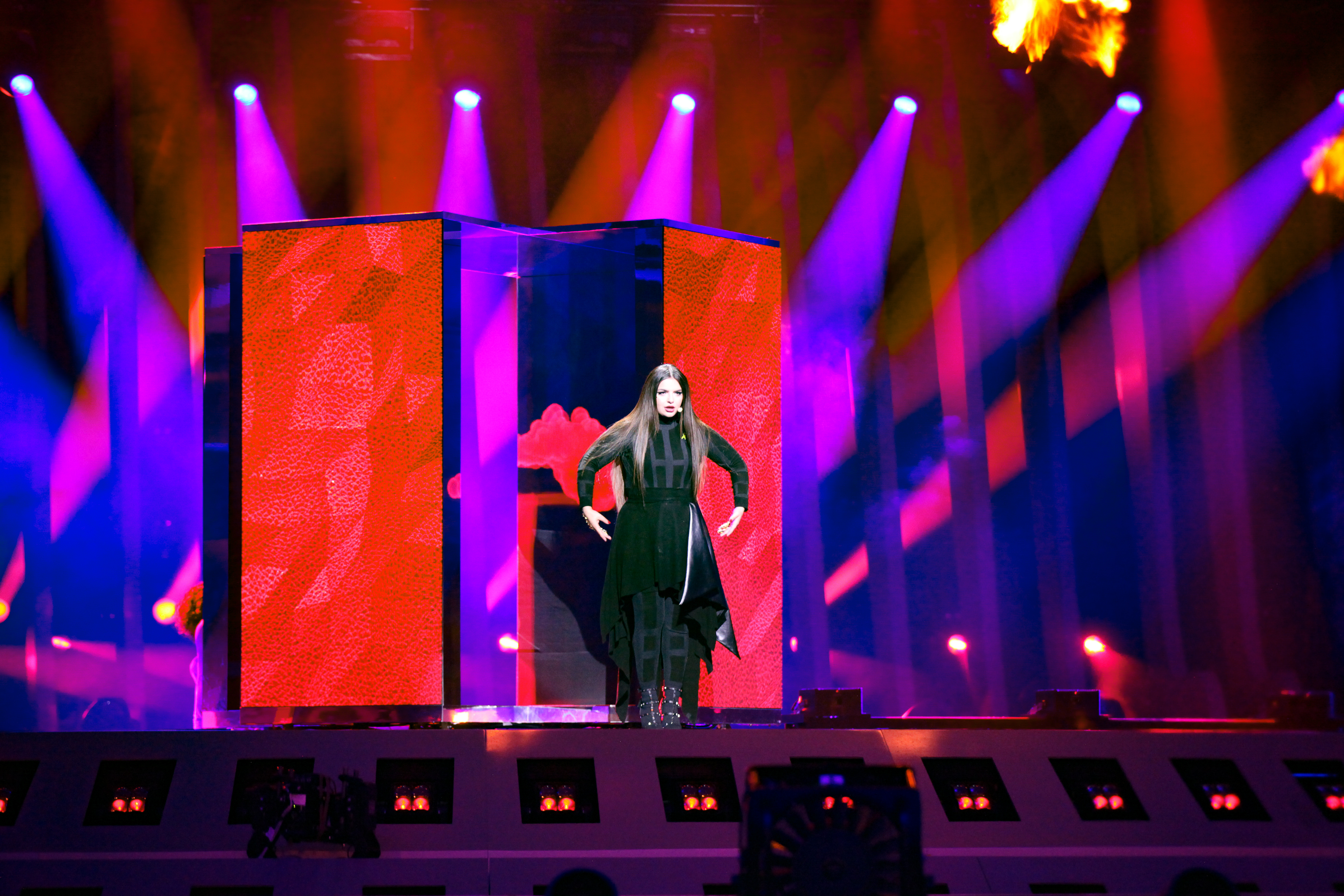
Christabelle in Lisbon (2018)

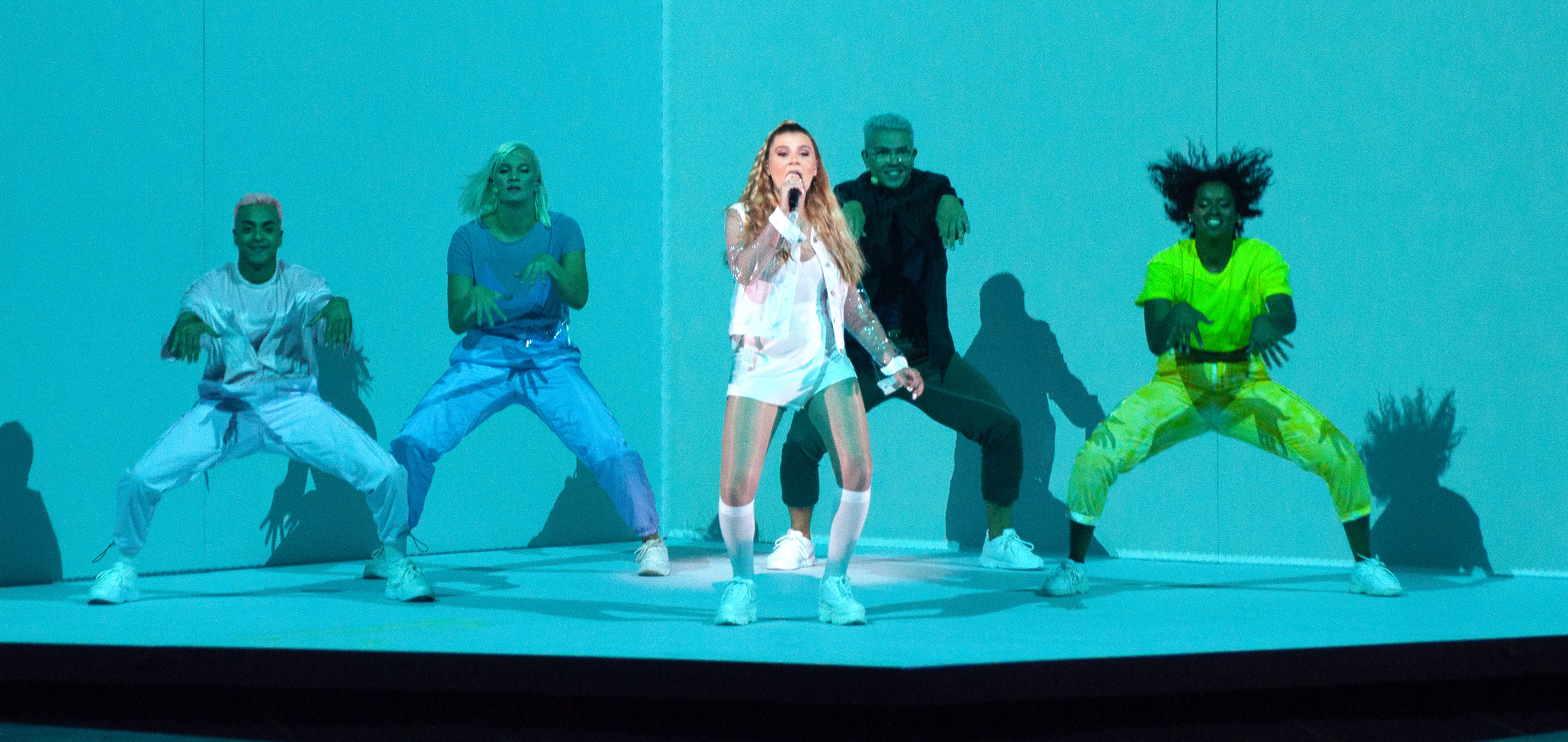
Michela Pace in Tel Aviv (2019)

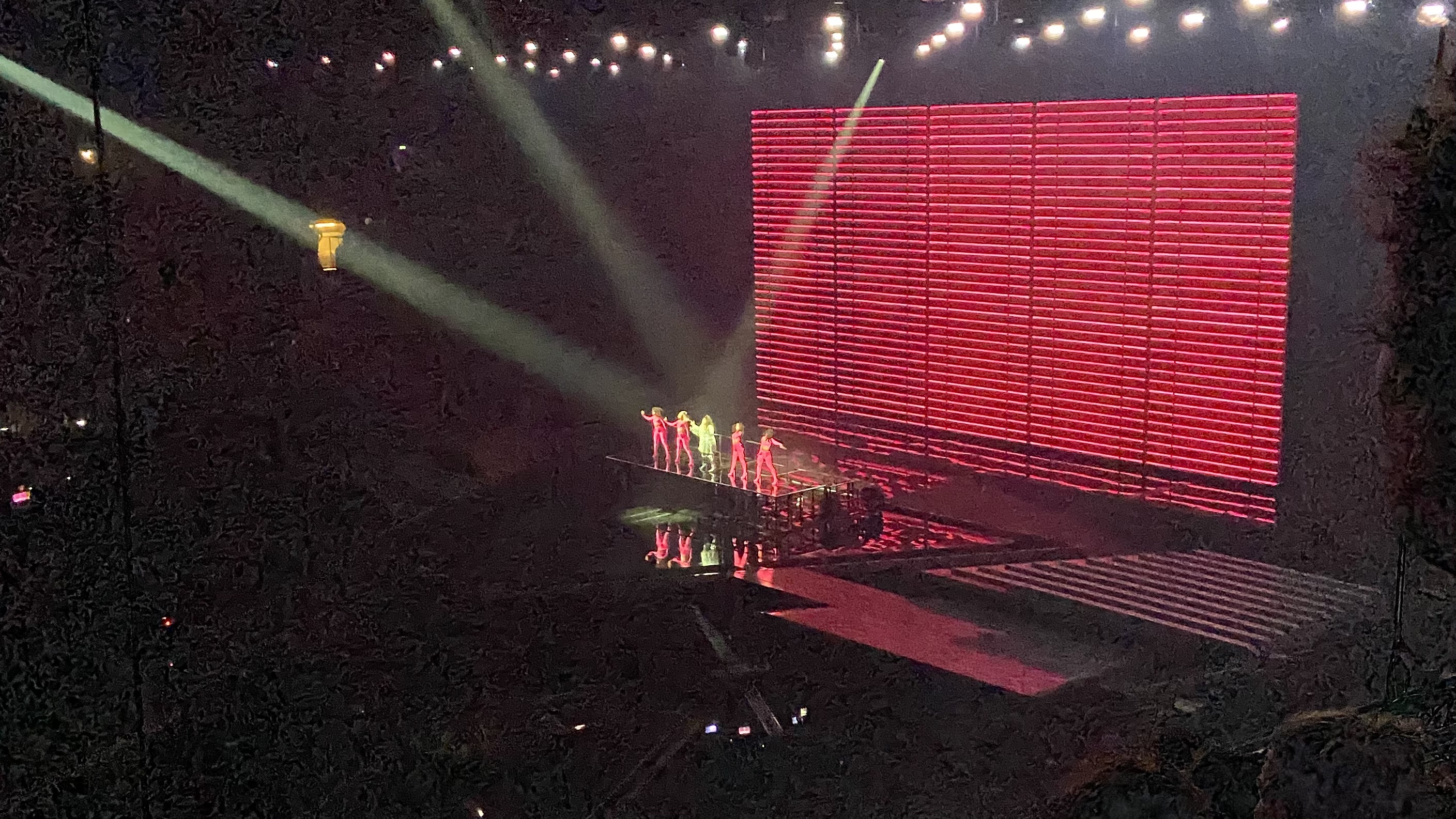
Destiny in Rotterdam (2021)

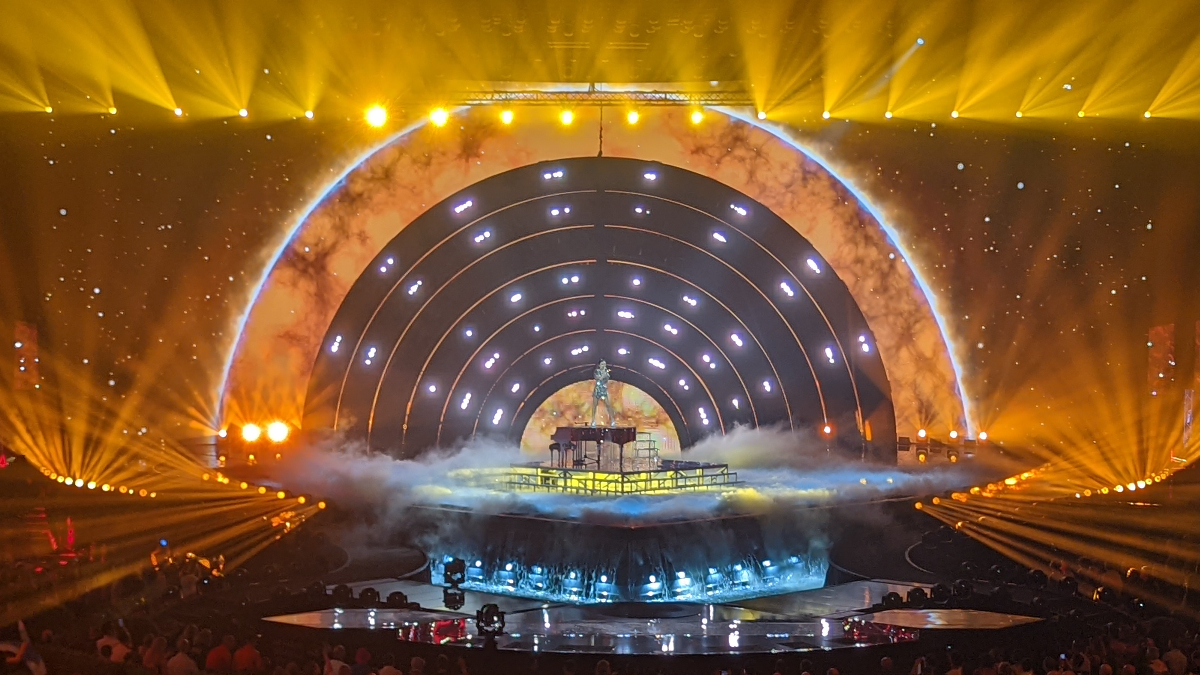
Emma Muscat in Turin (2022)

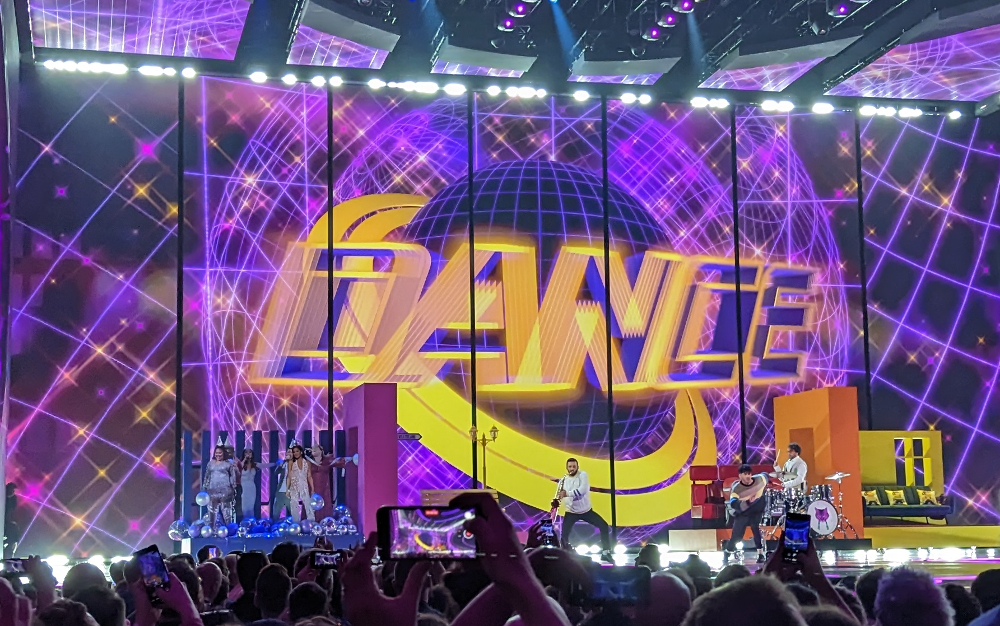
The Busker in Liverpool (2023)

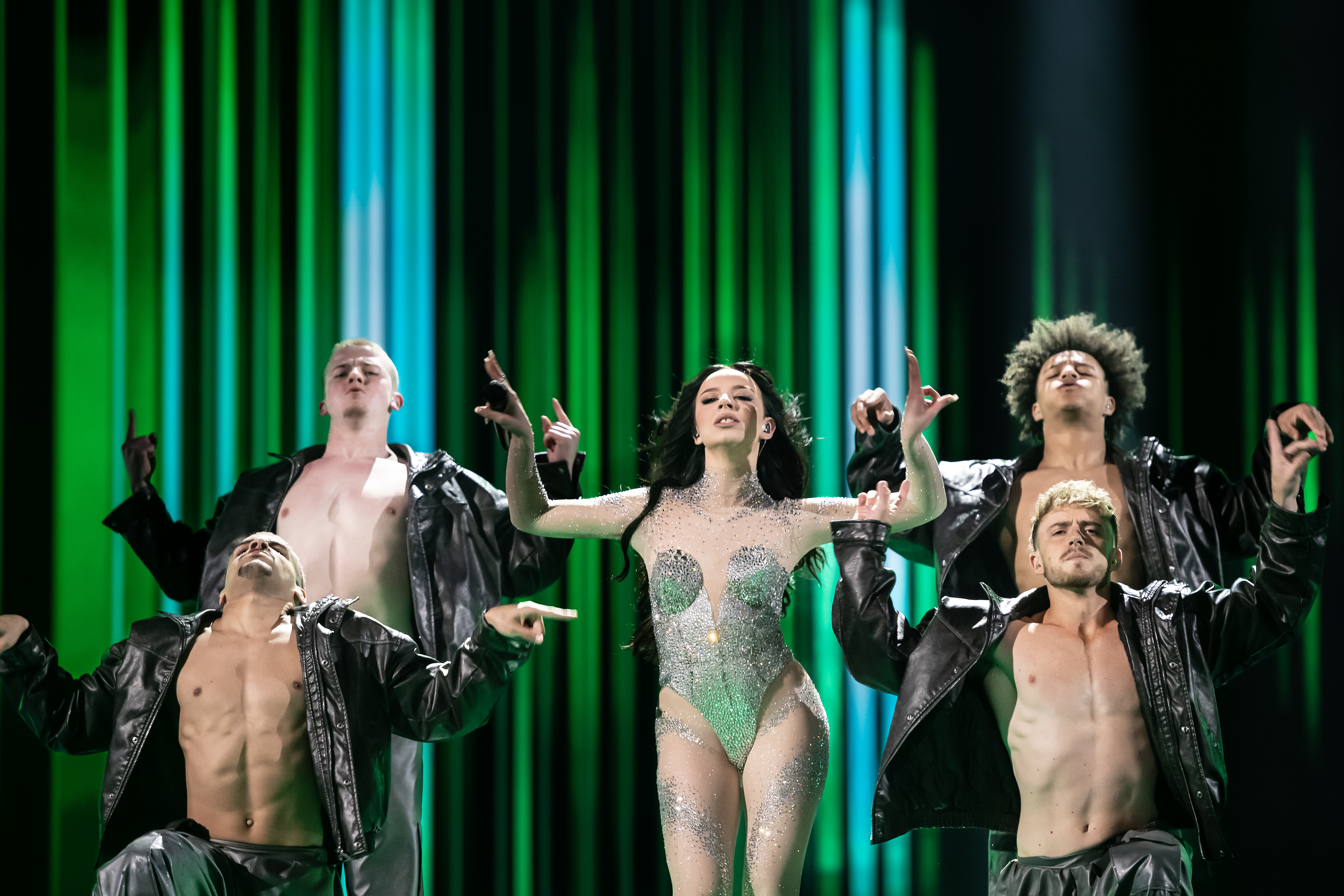
Sarah Bonnici in Malmö (2024)

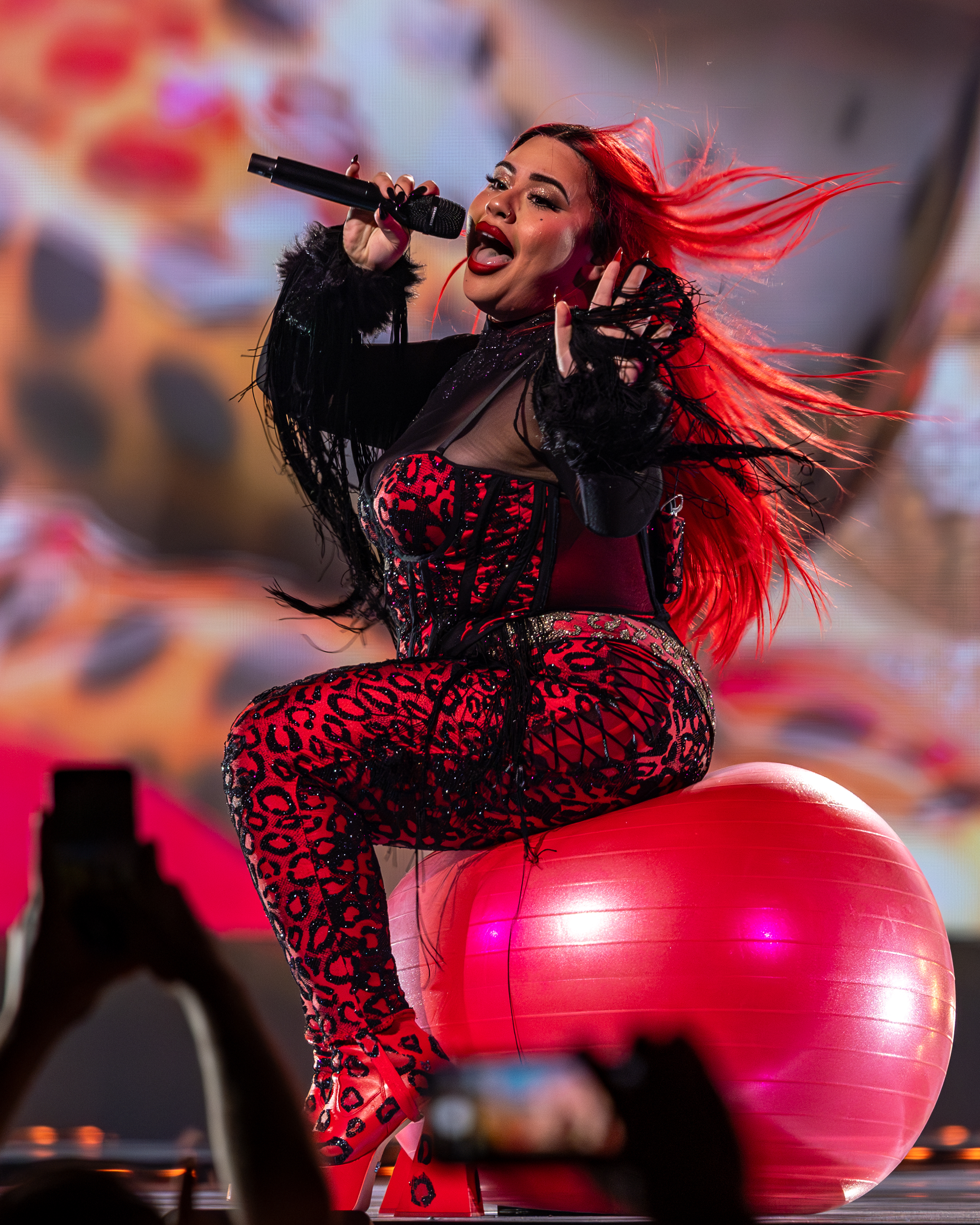
Miriana Conte in Basel (2025)

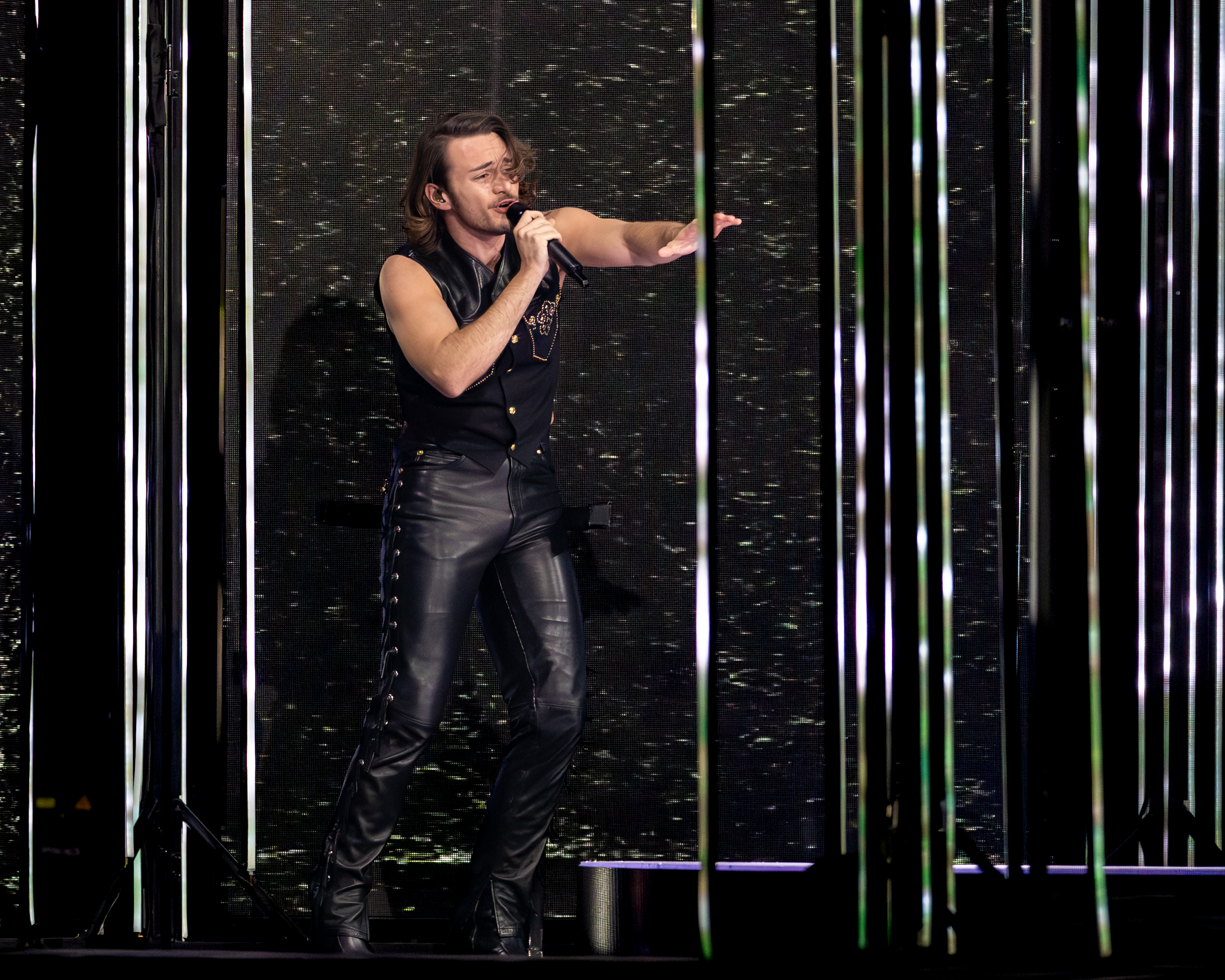
Aidan in Vienna (2026)

== See also ==
- Malta in the Junior Eurovision Song Contest – Junior version of the Eurovision Song Contest.
