= Claudette Pace =

Maltese singer and politician

Claudette Buttigieg

Deputy Speaker of the House of Representatives
- In office 24 June 2017 – 27 April 2026
- Speaker: Anglu Farrugia
- Preceded by: Ċensu Galea
- Succeeded by: Bernard Grech

Member of Parliament
- In office 11 March 2013 – 27 April 2026
- Constituency: Eighth District (2013-2017); Twelvth District (2017-2022)

Personal details
- Born: Claudette Pace; 8 February 1968 (age 58)
- Party: Nationalist Party
- Spouse: David Buttigieg
- Children: 1
- Musical career
- Origin: Malta
- Genres: Pop; europop
- Years active: 1997–present

Claudette Buttigieg (née Pace, 8 February 1968) is a Maltese retired politician, singer and former TV presenter, who served as a Member of Parliament and Deputy Speaker.

== Personal life and music career ==
Born in Naxxar, Claudette Pace began released her debut and only album Beginnings in 1997. It was nominated for Best Album at the 1998 Malta Music Awards. She won the Malta Song For Europe festival in January 2000, with the song Desire. The song is her debut and only single. She toured Germany, Australia and Sweden, the host nation of the Eurovision Song Contest 2000 before the main event where her entry Desire finished in eighth place. The song was subsequently chosen as the official song for UK's 2001 gay pride. She was the only television presenter that worked with the main three Maltese television networks, being One TV, NET TV and TVM. She was acquitted from continuing her career as presenter on National TV (TVM) due to her entering politics.

Claudette married David Buttigieg on 30 April 2002 and have a daughter, Kristina. The couple have their own production company Cliché Media Entertainment.

== Political career ==
She was elected in the Maltese parliament in 2013 from the 8th district as a member of the Nationalist Party and was a shadow minister for health.

She was re-elected in the 2017 general election and was appointed Deputy Speaker. She was also re-elected in the 2022 Maltese general election.

In June 2025, Buttigieg announced she would not be seeking re-election at the upcoming election. She was succeeded as deputy speaker by Bernard Grech.

== Post-political career ==
Buttigieg was appointed Chief Executive Officer at the University of Malta's Research, Innovdation & Development Trust (RIDT), succeeding Wilfred Kenely. She was previously appointed a Senior Executive Officer in 2022.

== Discography ==
Studio albums

- Beginnings (1997)

Singles

| Title | Year | Peak chart positions | Album |
|---|---|---|---|
| "Desire" | 2000 | — | Non-album singles |

Awards and achievements
| Preceded by Times Three with "Believe 'n Peace" | Malta in the Eurovision Song Contest; 2000 | Succeeded by Fabrizio Faniello with "Another Summer Night" |
