= Fabrizio Faniello =

Maltese pop singer

- Born: 27 April 1981 (age 44)
- Origin: Floriana, Malta
- Website: http://www.fabriziofaniello.de/

Fabrizio Faniello (born 27 April 1981) is a Maltese pop singer. He represented Malta at the Eurovision Song Contest in 2001 and 2006.

== Family ==
Fabrizio Faniello is the eldest of three children born to Vincenzo and Anna Faniello. He has two younger sisters, Claudia and Miriana. Claudia is also a singer and has performed in various Maltese festivals already, including the Malta Song For Europe 2006, 2007, 2008, 2009, 2010, 2011, 2012, 2013 and 2017, representing the country at the Eurovision Song Contest 2017 in Kyiv, Ukraine.

== Biography ==
Faniello discovered his passion for music at an early age. His teacher advised him to take vocal lessons. However, Faniello was also interested in playing football. In 1997 he played for one year in Turin. When he was sixteen however, he chose to make music his profession and returned to Malta. In the meantime he has released three successful albums and several singles. Although he has seen the most success in Malta, his singles and albums have been released in many other European countries. He scored a Top 10 hit with "The Whistle Hit" in Sweden in 2004, followed by another small chart hit "Bye Baby Bye Bye" in Sweden in 2005. Faniello is mainly known for light Europop music, but his willingness to experiment outside of conventional song structures, including forays into harsh noise, have been met with critical acclaim.

Faniello's management is located in Germany and a lot of his songs were written or co-written by German songwriters.

In January 2015, Faniello admitted to be recovering from a drug problem.

For 2018 a new single LIFE GOES ON is scheduled and end of march his new album. (sources: CAP-Sounds www.cap-sounds.de)

== Eurovision ==
He participated in the Eurovision Song Contest in 2001 and placed ninth. He also participated several times in the Maltese pre-selection for the Eurovision Song Contest (see below for additional information). In 2006 he once again represented Malta in the Eurovision Song contest, and was placed 24th in the Grand Final.

Faniello participated many times in the Maltese pre-selections for the Eurovision Song Contest:

1998 - "More Than Just a Game" (2nd place out of 20 contestants)
1999 - "Thankful for Your Love" (8th place out of 16 contestants)
2000 - "Change of Heart" (2nd place out of 16 contestants)
2001 - "Another Summer Night" (1st place out of 16 contestants) - (Placed 9th in the Eurovision)
2004 - "Did I Ever Tell You" (3rd place out of 16 contestants)
2005 - "Don't Tell It" (12th place out of 22 contestants)
2006 - "I Do" (1st place out of 18 contestants) - (Placed 24th in the Eurovision)
2011 - "No Surrender" (4th out of 24 contestants)
2012 - "I Will Fight For You" (6th out of 24 contestants)
2014 - "Just No Place Like Home" (eliminated in the semifinal)
2023 - "Try to Be Better" (8th place out of 16 contestants)

The songs "Change Of Heart" and "Another Summer Night" were later included on his debut album When I'm Dreaming. The songs "Did I Ever Tell You" and "Don't Tell It" were released on his 2005 album Believe.

The first time he won the pre-selections with the song "Another Summer Night". He represented Malta at the Eurovision Song Contest 2001 in Copenhagen, Denmark and managed to achieve 9th place. This was the start of his international career.

== Discography ==
=== Albums ===
- 2001: While I'm Dreaming #1 Malta
- 2004: When We Danced #1 Malta
- 2005: Believe #1 Malta
- 2007: Hits & Clips #1Malta
- 2011: No Surrender
- 2018: Unexpected

=== Singles ===
- 2001: "Another Summer Night"
- 2001: "My Girl"
- 2002: "Show Me Now"
- 2002: "Let Me be Your Lover"
- 2002: "Just 4 Christmas"
- 2004: "When We Danced"
- 2004: "I'm in Love (The Whistle Song)" #1 Malta, #7 Sweden (15 weeks Top-20), #11 Finland, Top 20 Belgium
- 2005: "Love on the Radio"
- 2006: "I Do"
- 2006: "Believe"
- 2007: "Love Me or Leave Me"
- 2007: "I Need to Know"
- 2010: "I No Can Do" (cover version of "Cari Jodoh" by Wali Band)
- 2010: "My Heart is Asking You" (cover version of "Baik Baik Sayang" by Wali Band)
- 2011: "No Surrender"
- 2011: "Know Me Better" (Written by Warren Bacci, Michael Johansson and Johan Beyerholm)
- 2012: "The Hardest Thing" (Written by Wayne Hector, Elliot Kennedy & Gary Barlow)
- 2013: "Ahfirli Jekk Trid" (Written by Dominic Minik and Rita Pace) Winner of the Konkors Kanzunetta Indipendenza 2013
- 2014: "Just no place like home"
- 2015: "Walking Away"
- 2015: "Fit-Tarf Tat-Triq"
- 2018: "Life Goes On"
- 2018: "Unexpected"
- 2019: "Dawl Għajnejja"

Awards and achievements
Preceded by Claudette Pace with "Desire"	Malta in the Eurovision Song Contest; 2001	Succeeded by Ira Losco with "7th Wonder"
Preceded by Chiara Siracusa with "Angel"	Malta in the Eurovision Song Contest; 2006	Succeeded by Olivia Lewis with "Vertigo"
