= Maria Camilleri =

Maltese politician (born 1952)

Maria Camilleri MOM

Member of the Parliament of Malta from the 12th district
- In office 5 December 1996 – 3 August 1998
- Preceded by: George Gatt
- Succeeded by: Evarist Bartolo

Personal details
- Born: 7 August 1952 (age 74) Rabat, Malta
- Education: University of Malta

Maria Dolores Camilleri MOM (born 1952) is a Maltese politician and educator who was a member of the Parliament of Malta and a delegate to the Parliamentary Assembly of the Council of Europe from 1996 to 1998. She is a member of the Labour Party. In 1997, she co-founded the Mariam Al-Batool school in Paola for Muslim children, and was the headmistress of the school for 17 years.

== Education and early career ==
Camilleri was born in Rabat, Malta on 7 August 1952. She studied at the University of Malta, receiving an honours degree in arts in 1974 and a teacher's license in 1975. She taught at Maria Regina Girls Junior Lyceum in Blata l-Bajda and was the head of the St Venera primary school in Santa Venera.

== Political career and Mariam Al-Batool ==
Camilleri first ran for office in 1996 as a Labour Party for the Parliament of Malta. She received fewer votes than Evarist Bartolo, who was elected in both the 10th and 12th districts. Bartolo vacated his 12th district seat and Camilleri won the resulting casual election on 14 November 1996. She was sworn in the following month on 5 December. During Camilleri's time in office, she was a member of the Public Accounts Committee and assistant whip for the Labour Party. She was also a member of the Maltese delegation in the Parliamentary Assembly of the Council of Europe, and was the first female Maltese member of the assembly. She ran for re-election in 1998, but Bartolo, who again won the election in both districts, opted to vacate his seat in the 10th district rather than the 12th, so there was no vacancy to fill. Camilleri's term in Parliament ended on 3 August 1998, at the dissolution of the legislative session.

She co-founded the Mariam Al-Batool school in Paola for Maltese Muslim children in 1997 and was its first head of school. She remained in the position for 17 years; during that time, Mariam Al-Batool was the only Muslim school in the world with a Christian headmistress.

In July 2008, Camilleri announced her candidacy as a Labour Party candidate in the 2009 European Parliament election, with the support of newly elected Labour Party leader Joseph Muscat. In her announcement, she cited her experience as the head of Mariam Al-Batool and her support for a Mediterranean Union. She received 2,031 votes in the first round, ranking tenth among the Labour candidates, and was ultimately unsuccessful after subsequent counts. In October 2013, Muscat appointed Camilleri as a special envoy for Arab countries. She was reported as a potential party nominee for President of Malta after the Labour Party regained the majority that year. Malta Today reported that Camilleri and Minister for Social Policy Marie-Louise Coleiro Preca were the top two candidates considered by Muscat; the prime minister ultimately nominated Coleiro Preca.

Camilleri was named a Member of the National Order of Merit in 2016. She co-authored a 2018 book published by the Labour Party to mark Muscat's tenth anniversary as leader of the Labour Party. In 2021, she called on the Labour Party to apologize after Muscat's chief of staff was charged with money laundering and Muscat himself resigned after the assassination of a Maltese investigative journalist.
