= Ċensu Galea =

Maltese politician (born 1956)

Mayor of San Pawl il-Baħar
- Incumbent
- Assumed office June 2024
- Preceded by: Alfred Grima

Deputy Speaker of the House of Representatives of Malta
- In office 8 May 2010 – 3 June 2017
- Preceded by: Carmelo Abela
- Succeeded by: Claudette Pace

Member of Parliament
- In office 1987–2017

Minister of Food, Agriculture and Fisheries
- In office 1994–1996

Minister of Transport and Telecommunications
- In office September 1998 – March 2004

Personal details
- Born: August 28, 1956 (age 70)
- Party: Partit Nazzjonalista
- Spouse: Grace nee Sammut
- Children: 4
- Education: University of Malta
- Occupation: Politician; architect

Ċensu Galea (born 28 August 1956) is a Maltese politician and architect who served as a Nationalist MP in the House of Representatives of Malta. He is a former Minister in various posts that he retained until 2008 when he lost his place in cabinet. He also served as Deputy Speaker.

== Political life ==
Galea was Secretary of the Nationalist Party Club of St. Paul's Bay. Between 1978 and 1981 he was also Secretary General and President of the Youth Section of the Nationalist Party.

Galea first contested the General Elections in the interests of the Nationalist Party in 1981. He was elected member of Parliament in the 1987, 1992, 1996, 1998 and 2003 General Elections. Following his re-election in 1992, Galea was appointed parliamentary Secretary in the Ministry for Social Security. In 1994, Galea was appointed Minister for Food, Agriculture and Fisheries responsible for Agriculture, Fisheries, Aquaculture and Housing. Between 1996 and 1998, he was shadow Minister for Transport and Ports, Secretary and Whip to the Nationalist Parliamentary Group. Following the General Elections of September 1998, Galea was appointed Minister for Transport and Telecommunications. He was reappointed in the same position following the elections of April 2003.

In March 2004, Galea was appointed as Minister for Competitiveness and Communications in the Cabinet of Prime Minister Lawrence Gonzi. His portfolio included Competition Policy, Small Business and the Self-Employed, Trade Services, Consumer Protection, Malta Standards Authority, Intellectual Property, Civil Aviation, Malta Maritime Authority, Malta Communications Authority, Wireless Telegraphy.

In March 2008 Galea was re-elected to parliament however was not assigned a Ministerial Role and thus lost his place in the Cabinet.

Following the resignation of Carmelo Abela from the role as Deputy Speaker in 2010, Galea was elected as Deputy Speaker. He was re-nominated for this post by the Nationalist party after it lost the national elections in 2013 and he was re-elected.

Galea was elected to the St. Paul's Bay local council in the 2024 Maltese local elections, becoming mayor after attaining the highest number of votes.

== Personal life ==
Galea studied at the Lyceum and the University of Malta from which he graduated as an architect in 1982. Galea is married to Grace née Sammut and they have two sons and two daughters. Their daughter Graziella is a Nationalist Party politician previously served as a councillor and mayor of St. Paul's Bay is currently an MP following her co-option into Parliament in January 2022. Graziella Galea was elected in the 2022 Maltese general election later in March of that same year.
