= Carm Lino Spiteri =

Maltese architect and politician (1932–2008)

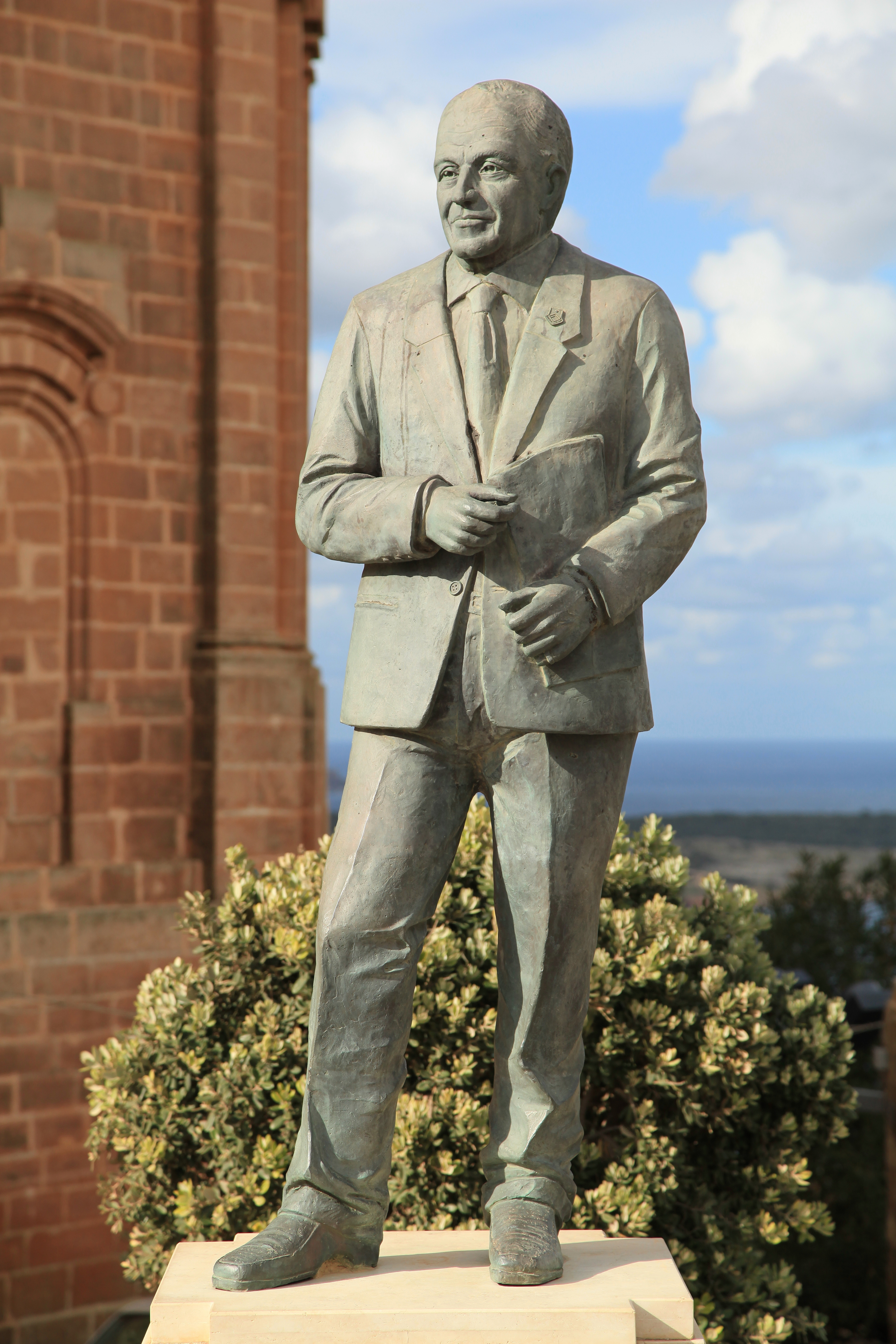
Statue of Carm Lino Spiteri in Mellieħa

Carm Lino Spiteri (9 September 1932 – 9 February 2008), also known by his nickname Iċ-Ċumpaqq, was a Maltese architect and politician. He was a member of the House of Representatives with the Nationalist Party between 1971 and 1987, and again between 1992 and 1996.

== Biography ==
Spiteri was born in Valletta on 9 September 1932. He graduated as an architect in 1955. As an architect, Spiteri was involved in a number of projects, including the construction of the Malta International Airport at Gudja and the conversion of the Sacra Infermeria in Valletta to the Mediterranean Conference Centre.

Spiteri's political career began in 1970, when he was approached by both George Borg Olivier and Dom Mintoff to contest the 1971 election with the Nationalist Party or Malta Labour Party respectively. Spiteri chose the former, and he was elected to parliament in a 1971 by-election.

Spiteri was reelected in the 1976 and 1981 elections. Since 1971 the Nationalist Party had been in opposition, and Spiteri became a harsh critic of the Labour Party, especially the minister Lorry Sant. The Nationalists won the next election in 1987, but Spiteri was not elected. He was reelected in 1992, and was appointed as the parliamentary whip.

His political career ended after he was not elected in the general election of 1996, although he remained interested in politics. He was also the president of the Soċjetà Mużikali Vittorja in his hometown Mellieħa, and in 1996 he was awarded a medal on the occasion of the 75th anniversary of Malta's self-government.

Spiteri died on 9 February 2008 at the age of 75.

== Legacy ==
A statue to Carm Lino Spiteri which was sculpted by Christopher Ebejer stands in Mellieħa.
