= Eileen Montesin =

Maltese actress and television personality

- Born: October 1, 1962 (age 63); Birkirkara, Malta
- Occupation(s): actress, television personality
- Years active: 1979–present
- Spouse: Mark Borg (m. 2013)
- Children: 1 daughter

Eileen Montesin (born October 1, 1962, Birkirkara) is a Maltese actress and television personality. Active since 1979, Montesin has had a varied career as a presenter, actress, and producer across the realms of radio, TV, and theatre.

== Career ==
=== 1979-1989 ===
Montesin began working in radio in September 1979, aged 16, as an announcer at Xandir Malta (now PBS).

At age 20, Montesin appeared on the TV program Kikku u Sika. From 1982 to 1987, Montesin was a presenter and producer of children's television. Programs she worked on included Int, Jien u il-Merill, Larry x-Xadin, Mid-Dinja ta’ Ġillin, and Nanna Għadek Tiftakar. The last children's show she worked on was L-Arka Mużikali. During the 1980s, Montesin was also a presenter for the adult shows Il-Konsumatur and Blanzuni ’85.

Montesin returned to the stage with Joe Gatt, and the two formed a drama company. Their first show, the comedy In-Neputija tal-Kappillan, sold out its shows at the Mediterranean Conference Centre and was filmed and broadcast on TV.

Montesin also began presenting lottery drawings, and was the first woman presenter of "the annual Valletta dances and Floriana float defile’ during Carnival".

=== 1990s ===
In the 1990s, Montesin and Gatt produced another sold-out play, Min Qatel Il-Kunjata.

The 1990s, also marked Montesin's appearances in the comedy Honeymoon Bl-Għeruq U X-Xniexel and the comic soap opera It-Tieġ ta’ Karmena Abdilla, in which she played the titular role.

Montesin also returned to radio, where Super Radio broadcast her sketches as the character Sossy.

In 1996, Montesin originated the character of Becky, the protagonist of the police drama Undercover. The role would be one of Montesin's most enduring characters. In 1999, Undercover introduced a recurring character who was gay, one of the first examples of positive LGBTQ representation in Maltese media. The storyline earned Montesin a reputation as an LGBTQ ally.

Around the late 1990s, Montesin hosted the music programs Issu L-Bieraħ and Rodeo (NET).

=== 2000s ===
Montesin continued as a Carnival presenter into the early 2000s. A 2006 clip of her saying "Ara Doris!" during the presentation became an enduring Maltese meme.

In 2002, Undercover moved with Montesin to TVM. She stayed with the network until 2009. After Undercover ended in 2003, Montesin reprised the character of Becky in the spin-off series Dejjem Tiegħek Becky, which she also was a screenwriter for.

In 2005, Montesin hosted Mhux Biċ–Ċajt, a show which aimed "to make the wildest dreams of lucky people come true".

Montesin has been the Maltese commentator for three iterations of the Eurovision Song Contest, including the 2006 event. In 2006 she also co-hosted the Malta Song for Europe, the contest to select Malta's representative at Eurovision.

=== 2020s ===
In 2021, Montesin received the Lifetime Achievement Award from the Lovin Malta Social Media Awards.

She returned to TVM in March 2025, as the narrator of the program Come Dine With Me Malta.

In early 2025, Montesin launched a website to host all the shows on which she'd acted.

== Early and personal life ==
Montesin was born in Birkirkara. She lived in Mosta and Valletta as a child. She began working on her school's radio broadcasts when she was ten. Montesin was also involved in acting before she was a teenager, and "found every opportunity to act or present, be it a variety show in Valletta or a sombre Good Friday pageant". When she was 15, she acted in Manoel Theatre's production of the play It-Tieġ.

On 10 August 2013, Eileen married her long-time partner, Mark Haber. They had been together for 30 years. The couple have a daughter, Christine (born 1991). They also have a granddaughter, Nina. Montesin involved her daughter in television from a young age, and she often accompanied Montesin or Haber to work.

Montesin believes in God, and prays daily.

== Filmography ==
Year	Title	Role	Character	Notes	Ref
1996-2003	Undercover	Director, writer, actress	Becky		
2004-2007	Dejjem Tieghek Becky	Director, writer, actress	Becky		
2024	Peppa Pig	Voice actress	Granny Pig		
