= Georgina Abela =

Maltese singer, songwriter

- Born: 23 April 1959 (age 67); Qormi, Southern Region, Malta

Georgina Abela (born 23 April 1959) is a Maltese singer and actress. She is best known for representing Malta in the Eurovision Song Contest on several occasions, either as an entrant, backing vocalist or songwriter.

== Career ==
Abela began singing at a young age, and competed in children's festivals in her youth. As an adult, she started her singing career in the heavy metal and rock scene, continuing into the 1980s. In 1985, she gained exposure after singing in a TV show, and was able to perform in and clubs across Malta and festivals further afield.

In 1991, Abela represented Malta at Eurovision, where she sang the duet "Could it be" with Paul Giordimaina. The duo came 6th in the competition. She returned to the contest the following year, this time as co-songwriter (with Raymond Mahoney) of Malta's song, "Little Child".

In 1996, Abela sang again at Eurovision, this time as a backing vocalist for "In a Woman's Heart".

By 2001, Abela had performed in multiple concerts abroad, including in Australia, Canada, Italy, and South Korea.

In 2004, she was a finalist in the Song for Europe Festival, the competition which determined Malta's representative for the 49th Eurovision Song Contest; she sang "Close To My Heart", written by Roger Tirazona and composed by her husband.

In 2015, Abela was a backing vocalist for Winter Moods' 30th anniversary concert.

=== Musical theatre ===
In 2004, Abela was a cast member in 1565 – The Musical, a musical about the Great Siege of Malta. She returned in 2015 for a concert performance of the show.

In 2009, Abela recorded "Il-Warda" for the remake of Maltese rock opera Ġensna.

In 2010, Abela originated the role of Mary of Nazareth in the musical Għeruqna.

== Personal life ==
Abela was born in Qormi.

She married fellow composer Paul Abela in 1986, after the two worked closely in her early solo career. Her son, Ryan Paul Abela (born 1991), is also a singer.

== Eurovision ==
Year	Title	Rank
1991	Could it be (performer)	6th
1992	Little Child (songwriter)	3rd
1996	In a Woman's Heart (backing vocalist)	10th
2001	Another Summer Night (lyricist)	9th

== See also ==
- Malta in the Eurovision Song Contest

Awards and achievements
Preceded by Renato with "Singing This Song"	Malta in the Eurovision Song Contest (with Paul Giordimaina); 1991	Succeeded by Mary Spiteri with "Little Child"
