= Mary Spiteri =

Maltese singer

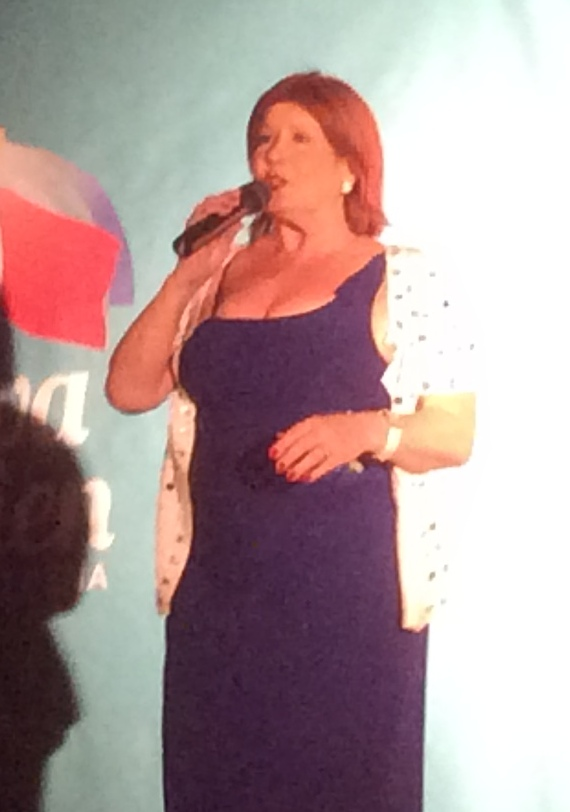
- Spiteri performing at Birkirkara Station Garden

Background information
- Born: 25 October 1947 (age 79); Naxxar, Malta
- Genre: Pop
- Occupations: Singer; television personality

Mary Spiteri (born 25 October 1947) is a Maltese singer and television personality from Naxxar. She has participated in various national and international music festivals, one of which she came third when representing Malta in the Eurovision Song Contest. She is known for her support for the Labour Party in her home country.

== Eurovision and later ==
Spiteri represented Malta in the 1992 Eurovision Song Contest held in Malmö, Sweden, with the song "Little Child". Spiteri finished in third place behind Ireland and the United Kingdom. But 1992 was not Spiteri's first attempt at Eurovision. In 1971, she participated in the Maltese heat of Eurovision with the song "Min Int?" (Who Are You?). Another attempt was made in 1975 when Spiteri performed two songs in the Maltese final, "Live For Tomorrow" and "Try a Little Love Today".

After her 1992 appearance, Spiteri became something of a diva figure to Eurovision fans and was presented with an award (on her 45th birthday) by Eurovision Network at their convention held in Coventry that year.

Spiteri's subsequent efforts to return to the Eurovision stage have not been successful. She was unplaced in the 1995 Maltese final with "Just One Love" but managed third place in 1997 with "Lovers Play with Words". In September 2006, Spiteri announced that she hoped to participate in the Malta Song for Europe Festival in 2007, and submitted a number of songs, none of which were selected for the Maltese Song for Europe Festival.

Spiteri tried again and she has successfully entered two songs which competed in Malta Song For Europe in 2008, but was unsuccessful in reaching the Eurovision.

In 2014, it was announced that Spiteri held the longest note for 13 seconds in Eurovision Song Contest history with her performance of Little Child in 1992.

Awards and achievements
Preceded by Paul & Georgina with "Could It Be"	Malta in the Eurovision Song Contest; 1992	Succeeded by William Mangion with "This Time"
