= Malta in the Eurovision Song Contest 1992 =

- Eurovision Song Contest 1992
- Participating broadcaster: Public Broadcasting Services (PBS)
- Country: Malta
- Selection process: Malta Song for Europe 1992
- Selection date: 14 March 1992

Competing entry
- Song: "Little Child"
- Artist: Mary Spiteri
- Songwriters: Georgina Abela; Raymond Mahoney

Placement
- Final result: 3rd, 123 points

Participation chronology

Malta was represented at the Eurovision Song Contest 1992 with the song "Little Child", composed by Georgina Abela, with lyrics by Raymond Mahoney, and performed by Mary Spiteri. The Maltese participating broadcaster, Public Broadcasting Services (PBS), selected its entry for the contest through a national final.

== Before Eurovision ==
=== Malta Song for Europe 1992 ===
The Maltese broadcaster, Public Broadcasting Services (PBS), held a national final, Malta Song for Europe 1992, to select its entry for the Eurovision Song Contest 1992. PBS held the national final on 14 March 1992 at the Mediterranean Conference Centre in Valletta, hosted by Charles Saliba and Anna Bonanno. Ten songs competed, sung in both Maltese and English. The winner was decided through an expert jury, with only the top three songs announced.

The winner was "Little Child" ("Tfajjel Ckejken"), sung by Mary Spiteri and composed by Georgina Abela and Raymond Mahoney.

R/O	Artist	Song		Place
R/O	Artist	Maltese version	English version	Place
1	Alex Schembri	"Int"	"Don't Leave Without Me"	
2	Enzo Guzman	"Tkellem Bil-Fjuri"	"Sunshine and Rainbows"	
3	Godwin Lucas	"Imħabba Fil-Ħarifa"	"Autumn Love"	
4	Moira Stafrace	"Tgħidlix"	"Don't Throw Our Love Away"	2
5	Mike Spiteri	"Paceville"	"Lonely People"	3
6	Phylisienne Brincat	"Flimkien"	"Together"	
7	Renato	"Jekk L-Eku Ta' Dal-Kliem"	"Fading Love"	
8	Marthese Tanti	"Ġardina Tal-Ħolm"	"Garden of Dreams"	
9	Helen Micallef	"Mat-Tnehid Tal-Mewġ"	"Yearning"	
10	Mary Spiteri	"Tfajjel Ċkejken"	"Little Child"	1

== At Eurovision ==
"Little Child", this time solely in English, was performed 10th on the night of the contest, following Cyprus and preceding Iceland. Spiteri came 3rd in the contest with 123 points. This was also Malta's best showing at the contest so far.

=== Voting ===
Points awarded to Malta
Score	Country
12 points	Luxembourg; Portugal; Spain; Sweden
10 points	Belgium; Ireland; Yugoslavia
8 points	Austria; Denmark; Iceland
7 points	Greece
6 points	
5 points	Netherlands; Switzerland
4 points	
3 points	Italy
2 points	
1 point	Cyprus

Points awarded by Malta
Score	Country
12 points	Ireland
10 points	Luxembourg
8 points	Turkey
7 points	Israel
6 points	United Kingdom
5 points	Italy
4 points	Austria
3 points	Yugoslavia
2 points	Spain
1 point	Cyprus
