= Deputy Speaker of the House of Representatives of Malta =

Deputy Speaker of the House of Representatives of Malta Viċi Speaker tal-Kamra tad-Deputati ta' Malta
- Coat of Arms of the Republic of Malta

- Incumbent; Bernard Grech since 20 June 2026
- Style: Mr.Speaker / Ms.Speaker (Acting Speaker), The Honourable (Deputy Speaker)
- Appointer: House of Representatives
- Term length: One Legislature
- Formation: 1921
- Website: http://www.parliament.gov.mt

The Deputy Speaker of the House of the Representatives of Malta acts as a deputy to the Speaker. Whenever the Speaker is absent from the House. It is the Deputy Speaker that assumes the role of Acting Speaker. Unlike the Speaker, the Deputy Speaker can only be appointed from inside the House and he does not lose his original vote even when he is Acting Speaker.

The Deputy Speaker acts as the Chairperson of Committees when the House is resolved into a Committee stage. Such is the case for instance, in the General Estimates Bill, when the House resolves itself into a Committee of Supply.

The positions of Speaker and Deputy Speaker are established by article 59 of the Constitution of Malta.

== Deputy Speakers ==
Parliament of Malta: Deputy Speakers
Name	Date	Legislature
Paolo Pace	1962–1966	First
Alfred Bonnici	1966–1971	Second
Emanuel Attard Bezzina	1971–1976	Third
Nestu Laiviera	1976–1981	Fourth
Kalċidon Agius		
Daniel Micallef	1982–1987	Fifth
Pawlu Xuereb		
Joseph Baldacchino		
Jimmy Farrugia	1987–1992	Sixth
Lawrence Gonzi		
Lawrence Gonzi	1992–1996	Seventh
Myriam Spiteri Debono	1996–1998	Eighth
Anton Tabone	1998–2003	Ninth
Anton Tabone	2003–2008	Tenth
Louis Galea	2008–2013	Eleventh
Michael Frendo		
Anġlu Farrugia	2014–2017	Twelfth
Anġlu Farrugia	2017–2022	Thirteenth
Anġlu Farrugia	2022–2026	Fourteenth
Carmelo Abela	2026–	Fifteenth
