= Meek (singer) =

British singer

- Born: Georgia Meek; London, UK
- Genres: Alternative pop; indie pop; pop
- Occupations: Singer; songwriter; producer
- Years active: 2017–present
- Label: BMG

Georgia Meek, known professionally as Meek (stylised in all caps), is a British singer and songwriter. She first gained recognition under her birth name through independent indie-pop releases, which saw her collaborate with artists including James Hurr, Lumix and Will Clarke, securing support from across the industry, including an appearance at BBC Radio 1's Big Weekend in 2020. In 2025, she relaunched her artist project under the mononym MEEK after signing with BMG. Her debut single under the new name, "Fabulous", was released in January 2026.

Meek has written singles for artists including Rita Ora, Alan Walker, Martin Garrix, R3hab, Charlotte Plank and Skepsis.

== Career ==
=== 2017–2024: Career beginnings as Georgia Meek ===
Meek was born in Guildford, Surrey. She began writing and releasing music as a teenager, focused on a style which blended alternative pop and indie influences. She performed locally across London and released music independently under her birth name Georgia Meek, building an audience on streaming platforms and live shows across the UK.

She released a series of singles as Georgia Meek that established her presence in the UK alternative pop scene. Her single "Swim" (featuring Katie Mac) was noted for its themes of empowerment and sexual exploration. She was selected to perform as part of BBC Music Introducing at Radio 1's Big Weekend 2020.

Her early releases explored personal themes including relationships, trauma recovery, and empowerment, with interviews highlighting her intention to create "liberation"-focused pop music inspired by personal experiences.

In 2020, Meek founded Female Music Producers World (FMP World), a group of over 3,000 women working in music production and received a scholarship from Spitfire Audio to study at Tileyard Education.

In 2021, Meek signed to publishing company Tileyard Music as a songwriter. She has since written songs for artists including Rita Ora, Alan Walker, Martin Garrix, R3hab, Charlotte Plank and Skepsis.

In 2023, Meek co-wrote the song "Mara", performed by Denise Mercieca as an entry to Malta's 2023 national final (MESC) to be Malta's submission for the Eurovision Song Contest 2024. The song finished 5th, beaten by "Loop" by Sarah Bonnici.

=== 2024–present: Meek ===
In 2024, Meek reintroduced herself under the mononym Meek. Her first release under her new moniker was with Norwegian DJ Alan Walker, providing lead vocals on his 2025 release "Dancing in Love". In 2026, Meek signed to BMG, with the label saying she was part of their intention to "deliver bigger and more exciting new music opportunities".

Her debut single under BMG, "Fabulous", was released on 30 January 2026. Critics called it a confident pop sound inspired by queer nightlife culture. The single was added to the Capital playlist on release and was named a Future Bop on BBC Radio 1's "Future Pop" show.

Following her debut single as Meek, she sold out her debut headline show at London’s The Garage and was announced to be performing at festivals across the United Kingdom including Mighty Hoopla, London Pride, Boardmasters, and Manchester Village Pride.

On 2 May 2026, Meek performed on the sixth episode of Saturday Night Live UK, introduced by host Aimee Lou Wood. She performed "Fabulous" and "Beautiful Freeks".

== Artistry ==
Meek’s music has been described as alternative and pop-leaning, combining emotional storytelling with upbeat production. Across both phases of her career, her songwriting has explored themes of empowerment, identity, relationships, and self-expression.

== Discography ==
=== EPs ===
Title	Details
Pop Culture (Note: Released as Georgia Meek)	Released: 1 November 2019; Label: Self-released; Format: Digital download, streaming
Fabulous	Released: 29 January 2026; Label: BMG; Format: Digital download, streaming
Terminally Verbal	Released: 11 September 2026; Label: BMG; Format: Digital download, streaming

=== Singles ===
Title (Note: From 2018 to 2023, singles were released as Georgia Meek.)	Year	Peak chart positions	Album
Title	Year	UK DL	Album
"Swim" (with Katie Mac)	2018	—	Non-album singles
"Right Kind of Wrong"	2018	—	Non-album singles
"Pray"	2019	—	Pop Culture
"When You're Sober"	2019	—	Pop Culture
"Bones"	2019	—	Pop Culture
"We Make Music"	2020	—	Non-album singles
"Just Kids"	2020	—	Non-album singles
"Higher Love"	2020	—	Non-album singles
"Made of Stone"	2020	—	Non-album singles
"Feels Like Heaven" (with Carstn)	2021	—	Non-album singles
"Infinity" (with Tru Concept and Paul Harris)	2022	—	Infinity
"Dead End" (with GotSome)	2022	—	Dead End
"Lavender"	2022	—	Non-album singles
"Take Me Higher" (with Lum!x and DES3ETT)	2023	—	Non-album singles
"All My Friends Need Therapy"	2023	—	Non-album singles
"Dancing in Love" (with Alan Walker)	2025	—	Walkerworld 2.0
"Fabulous" (Note: "Fabulous" is also included on Meek's second EP, Terminally Verbal.)	2026	22	Fabulous
"Beautiful Freaks"	2026	—	Terminally Verbal
"Expensive Taste"	2026	—	Terminally Verbal
"Test My Luck" (with Purple Disco Machine)	2026	—	Cosmotropia
"—" denotes a recording that did not chart or was not released in that territory.

==== As featured artist ====
Title	Year	Album
"Come Thru" (Illatek & Rightstar featuring Danger K and Georgia Meek)	2019	Non-album singles
"Secret Hideaway" (Aubrey Whitfield featuring Georgia Meek)	2022	Non-album singles
"Vibe Like That" (James Hurr and Simon Field featuring Georgia Meek)	2023	Non-album singles
"Flame" (Thomas Irwin featuring Georgia Meek)	2023	Non-album singles
"Drive" (Tobtok and PS1 featuring Georgia Meek)	2024	Non-album singles
"Memories" (Will Clarke featuring Georgia Meek)	2024	Midnight Mass
