= Malta in the Eurovision Song Contest 2025 =

- Eurovision Song Contest 2025
- Participating broadcaster: Public Broadcasting Services (PBS)
- Country: Malta
- Selection process: Malta Eurovision Song Contest 2025
- Selection date: 8 February 2025

Competing entry
- Song: "Serving"
- Artist: Miriana Conte
- Songwriters: Benjamin Schmid; Matthew 'Muxu' Mercieca; Miriana Conte; Sarah Evelyn Fullerton

Placement
- Semi-final result: Qualified (9th, 53 points)
- Final result: 17th, 91 points

Participation chronology

Malta was represented at the Eurovision Song Contest 2025 with the song "Serving", written by Benjamin Schmid, Matthew Mercieca, Miriana Conte, and Sarah Evelyn Fullerton, and performed by Conte herself. The Maltese participating broadcaster, Public Broadcasting Services (PBS), selected its entry for the contest through the national final Malta Eurovision Song Contest (MESC) 2025.

Malta was drawn to compete in the second semi-final of the Eurovision Song Contest which took place on 15 May 2025 and was later selected to perform in position 9. At the end of the show, "Serving" was announced among the top 10 entries of the second semi-final and hence qualified to compete in the final, marking the first qualification for the country since 2021. It was later revealed that Malta placed ninth out of the sixteen participating countries in the semi-final with 53 points. In the final, Malta performed in position 20 and placed seventeenth out of the 26 participating countries, scoring a total of 91 points.

== Background ==
Prior to the 2025 contest, the Maltese Broadcasting Authority (MBA) until 1975, and the Public Broadcasting Services (PBS) since 1991, have participated in the Eurovision Song Contest representing Malta thirty-six times since MBA's first entry in 1971. MBA briefly competed in the contest in the 1970s before withdrawing for sixteen years, while PBS competed in every contest since their return in 1991. Their best placing in the contest so far is second, which it achieved on two occasions; 2002 with the song "7th Wonder" performed by Ira Losco, and in 2005 with the song "Angel" performed by Chiara. In the 2024 edition, "Loop" performed by Sarah Bonnici finished last in the second semi-final.

As part of its duties as participating broadcaster, PBS organises the selection of its entry in the Eurovision Song Contest and broadcasts the event in the country. The broadcaster confirmed its intentions to participate at the 2025 contest on 21 October 2024. Since 2022, PBS has selected its entry through a national final procedure called Malta Eurovision Song Contest (MESC), a method that is continued for its 2025 participation.

== Before Eurovision ==
=== Malta Eurovision Song Contest 2025 ===
Malta Eurovision Song Contest 2025 was the national final format developed by PBS to select its entry for the Eurovision Song Contest 2025. The competition consisted of two semi-finals and a final held between 4 and 8 February 2025 at the Malta Fairs and Conventions Centre in Ta' Qali, hosted by Pauline Agius, Davide Tucci, and Valentina Rossi. The competition was broadcast live on TVM as well as on TVM+ with Maltese sign language interpretation and lyrics, as well as on the broadcaster's streaming service tvmi.mt. Backstage interviews during the shows were hosted by Daniel Testa (who represented Malta in Junior Eurovision 2008) and Ylenia Spiteri, and streamed online on tvmi.mt.

==== Format ====
The competition consisted of twenty-four competing songs. Two semi-finals with twelve songs each took place on 4 and 6 February 2025 where the top eight entries qualified from each semi-final to compete in the final on 8 February 2025. Nine judges and the public via televoting evaluated the songs during the shows, both of which had an equal stake (50%) in the final result. Ties in the final results were broken based on the entry which received the higher score from the public. The nine members of the jury that evaluated the entries during the semi-finals and final consisted of:

- Alison Abela (Malta) – Actress
- Kryštof Šámal (Czechia) – Head of Delegation for Czechia at the Eurovision Song Contest
- Nicola Said (Malta) – Soprano
- Mariangela Borneo (Italy) – Director of International Relations and European Affairs at RAI
- Chris Gatt (Malta) – Singer and musician
- Jill Morgan (Ireland) – Talent executive
- Keith Muscat (Malta) – Artist manager and music producer
- William Lee Adams (United States) – Journalist at Wiwibloggs
- Moira Stafrace (Malta) – Singer, represented Malta in 1994 as part of Chris and Moira

==== Competing entries ====
Artists and composers were able to submit their entries to the broadcaster between 18 and 29 November 2024. Songwriters from any nationality were able to submit songs as long as the artist was Maltese or possessed Maltese citizenship. Artists were able to submit as many songs as they wish, however, they could only compete with one in the semi-finals. A song writing camp called the 'MESC Music Exchange Camp' was held in Valletta between 16 and 21 June 2024 in order to create songs to be submitted for the competition, with 60 songs eventually created in the camp.

24 semi-finalist entries were selected and announced during a special programme aired on TVM+ on 12 December 2024. Among the selected competing artists are former Eurovision entrants Fabrizio Faniello (who represented Malta in 2001 and in 2006) and Jessika Muscat (who represented San Marino in 2018), both as part of the group JVF, as well as Kurt Calleja (who represented Malta in 2012). Ahead of the competition, TVM broadcast a daily preview show titled #togetherformusic starting on 12 January 2025, which was hosted by Daniel Testa and Ylenia Spiteri.

On 16 December 2024, Alexandra Alden was disqualified from the competition as her competing song "Magnolia" was published before 1 September 2024, which breaches the contest's rules. "Għażliet" performed by Dario Bezzina featuring Żeppi Il-Muni was announced as the replacement entry on 17 December 2024.

Entry disqualified Replacement entry

| Artist | Song | Songwriters |
|---|---|---|
| Adria Twins | "Qalb ma' Qalb" | Sebastian Pritchard-James; Joe Julian Farrugia; Melanie Wehbe |
| ~~Alexandra Alden~~ | ~~"Magnolia"~~ | ~~Alexandra Alden~~ |
| Dario Bezzina ft. Żeppi Il-Muni | "Għażliet" | Philip Vella |
| Dre' Curmi | "Te amo" | Dre' Curmi; Matthew 'Muxu' Mercieca; Søren Emil Lunøe Schiødt; Audun Agnar Guldbrandsen |
| Haley | "Whistleblower" | Benjamin Schmid; Emil Calleja Bayliss; Haley Azzopardi; Siv von Bulow; Tom Hugo |
| Justine Shorfid | "Still I Rise" | Benjamin Alasu; Justine Shorfid; Mateus Augusto Da Silva; Sarah Evelyn Fullerton |
| JVF | "Festa (No Time for Siesta)" | Alexander Nyborg Olsson; Audun Agnar Guldbrandsen; Erba'; Emil Calleja Bayliss; Leire Gotxi Angel; Maria Abdilla; Tom Hugo |
| Kantera | "Lalaratatakeke Lalaratakabum" | Linnea Deb; Kantera; Joe Julian Farrugia |
| Kelsey Bellante | "365" | Andreas Stone Johansson; Audun Agnar Guldbrandsen; Sarah Evelyn Fullerton |
| Kelsy Attard | "Love Me Loud" | Dana Burkhard; Kelsy Attard; Matteo Depares; Patrik Jean |
| Krista Šujak | "Unheard" | Dana Burkhard; Krista Šujak; Pelle Nylén; Tom Oehler |
| Kristy Spiteri | "Heaven Sent" | Linnea Deb; Tom Oehler; Kristy Spiteri; Teodora Špirić |
| Kurt Anthony | "Miegħek Biss" | Emil Calleja Bayliss; Enrico Palmosi; Gilbert Camilleri |
| Kurt Calleja | "Aziz/a" | Edward Abela; Kevin Paul Calleja; Kurt Calleja |
| Marie Claire | "Wildflower" | Christina Magrin; Itamar Lapidot; Marie Claire Cappello |
| Mark Anthony Bartolo | "Hideaway" | David Meilak; Mark Anthony Bartolo; Sebastian Pritchard-James; Silje Montsko Blandkjenn |
| Martina Borg | "Yo Listen" | Martina Borg; Tom Oehler; Andreas Stone Johansson; Christina Magrin |
| Matthew Cilia | "Control" | Andreas Lindberg; Marcus Winther-John; Matthew Cilia; Rasmus Olsen |
| Miguel Bonello | "Breaking the Cycle" | Miguel Bonello; Annemaríe Reynis; Ivo Blahunek; Håvard Haugland |
| Miriana Conte | "Kant" | Benjamin Schmid; Matthew 'Muxu' Mercieca; Miriana Conte; Sarah Evelyn Fullerton |
| Nathan | "Concrete" | Andreas Stone Johansson; Audun Agnar Guldbrandsen; Henrik Tala; Nathan Psaila |
| Raquela | "Silenced" | Jean Paul Borg; Matteo Depares; Raquela Dalli |
| Stefan Galea | "Lablab (Talk Talk)" | Itamar Lapidot; Matthew Caruana; Silje Montsko Blandkjenn; Stefan Galea |
| The Alchemists | "Rubble & Stone" | Argyle Singh; Klinsmann Coleiro; The Alchemists; Rasmus Olsen |
| Victoria Sciberras | "Juno" | Bas Wissink; Dave Hutchinson; Henk Pool; Mie Louise Nielsen; Niels Sakko; Victoria Sciberras |

==== Semi-finals ====
The two semi-finals took place on 4 and 6 February 2025. In each semi-final twelve songs competed for eight qualifying spots in the final. The interval act of the semi-finals featured performances by former Eurovision artists: Mihai Trăistariu, who represented Romania in 2006, and Adonxs, who is set to represent Czechia in 2025 (premiering his entry "Kiss Kiss Goodbye" in an acoustic version), performed in the first semi-final, while Denmark's 2013 winner Emmelie de Forest, Richard Edwards, who represented Malta in 2014 as part of Firelight, and Claudia Faniello, who represented Malta in 2017, performed in the second semi-final. The shows also featured performances by former Maltese national final participants: Brooke, Klinsmann, and Lawrence Gray in the first semi-final, and Janvil in the second semi-final.

Semi-final 1 – 4 February 2025
| R/O | Artist | Song | Result |
|---|---|---|---|
| 1 | Mark Anthony Bartolo | "Hideaway" | Qualified |
| 2 | Dre' Curmi | "Te amo" | —N/a |
| 3 | Raquela | "Silenced" | Qualified |
| 4 | Kristy Spiteri | "Heaven Sent" | Qualified |
| 5 | Matthew Cilia | "Control" | —N/a |
| 6 | Marie Claire | "Wildflower" | —N/a |
| 7 | Justine Shorfid | "Still I Rise" | Qualified |
| 8 | JVF | "Festa (No Time for Siesta)" | Qualified |
| 9 | Adria Twins | "Qalb ma' Qalb" | Qualified |
| 10 | Haley | "Whistleblower" | —N/a |
| 11 | Victoria Sciberras | "Juno" | Qualified |
| 12 | Kurt Calleja | "Aziz/a" | Qualified |

Semi-final 2 – 6 February 2025
| R/O | Artist | Song | Result |
|---|---|---|---|
| 1 | Kelsey Bellante | "365" | —N/a |
| 2 | Dario Bezzina ft. Żeppi Il-Muni | "Għażliet" | Qualified |
| 3 | Kelsy Attard | "Love Me Loud" | —N/a |
| 4 | Miriana Conte | "Kant" | Qualified |
| 5 | The Alchemists | "Rubble & Stone" | Qualified |
| 6 | Martina Borg | "Yo Listen" | Qualified |
| 7 | Nathan | "Concrete" | Qualified |
| 8 | Kurt Anthony | "Miegħek Biss" | —N/a |
| 9 | Kantera | "Lalaratatakeke Lalaratakabum" | Qualified |
| 10 | Krista Šujak | "Unheard" | Qualified |
| 11 | Stefan Galea | "Lablab (Talk Talk)" | Qualified |
| 12 | Miguel Bonello | "Breaking the Cycle" | —N/a |

==== Final ====
The final took place on 8 February 2025. The sixteen entries that qualified from the semi-finals were performed again and the 50/50 combination of votes of a nine-member jury panel and the results of public televoting determined the winner. The interval act of the show featured performances by the Mużika Mużika 2024 winner Maxine Pace, Ramires Sciberras, who represented Malta in Junior Eurovision 2024, as well as former Eurovision artists: Alexander Rybak, who won Eurovision for Norway in 2009, and Sarah Bonnici, who represented Malta in 2024. After the votes from the jury panel and televote were combined, "Kant" performed by Miriana Conte was the winner. Around 27,000 televotes were received by the public.

Final – 8 February 2025
| R/O | Artist | Song | Jury | Televote | Total | Place |
|---|---|---|---|---|---|---|
| 1 | Miriana Conte | "Kant" | 88 | 94 | 182 | 1 |
| 2 | Victoria Sciberras | "Juno" | 74 | 40 | 114 | 4 |
| 3 | Dario Bezzina ft Żeppi l-Muni | "Għażliet" | 10 | 62 | 72 | 6 |
| 4 | JVF | "Festa (No Time for Siesta)" | 30 | 46 | 76 | 5 |
| 5 | The Alchemists | "Rubble & Stone" | 30 | 11 | 41 | 9 |
| 6 | Krista Šujak | "Unheard" | 44 | 15 | 59 | 7 |
| 7 | Raquela | "Silenced" | 21 | 5 | 26 | 12 |
| 8 | Kantera | "Lalaratatakeke Lalaratakabum" | 52 | 85 | 137 | 3 |
| 9 | Nathan | "Concrete" | 0 | 10 | 10 | 16 |
| 10 | Justine Shorfid | "Still I Rise" | 14 | 10 | 24 | 13 |
| 11 | Adria Twins | "Qalb ma' Qalb" | 1 | 26 | 27 | 10 |
| 12 | Martina Borg | "Yo Listen" | 6 | 9 | 15 | 14 |
| 13 | Mark Anthony Bartolo | "Hideaway" | 15 | 12 | 27 | 11 |
| 14 | Kurt Calleja | "Aziz/a" | 31 | 16 | 47 | 8 |
| 15 | Kristy Spiteri | "Heaven Sent" | 102 | 72 | 174 | 2 |
| 16 | Stefan Galea | "Lablab (Talk Talk)" | 4 | 9 | 13 | 15 |

Detailed jury votes
| R/O | Song | A. Abela | K. Šámal | N. Said | M. Borneo | C. Gatt | J. Morgan | K. Muscat | W. L. Adams | M. Straface | Total |
|---|---|---|---|---|---|---|---|---|---|---|---|
| 1 | "Kant" | 8 | 10 | 10 | 10 | 12 | 10 | 8 | 12 | 8 | 88 |
| 2 | "Juno" | 10 | 6 | 8 | 7 | 7 | 6 | 10 | 8 | 12 | 74 |
| 3 | "Għażliet" | | 1 | 1 | 5 | | | | 2 | 1 | 10 |
| 4 | "Festa (No Time for Siesta)" | 7 | | 3 | 4 | 2 | 3 | 7 | 4 | | 30 |
| 5 | "Rubble & Stone" | 5 | | | 6 | 1 | 4 | 6 | 1 | 7 | 30 |
| 6 | "Unheard" | 2 | 8 | 2 | 3 | 6 | 7 | 3 | 7 | 6 | 44 |
| 7 | "Silenced" | 4 | 5 | 5 | | | | | 3 | 4 | 21 |
| 8 | "Lalaratatakeke Lalaratakabum" | 6 | 7 | 6 | 8 | 8 | 8 | 2 | 5 | 2 | 52 |
| 9 | "Concrete" | | | | | | | | | | 0 |
| 10 | "Still I Rise" | 1 | 4 | 4 | | | 2 | | | 3 | 14 |
| 11 | "Qalb ma' Qalb" | | | | | | 1 | | | | 1 |
| 12 | "Yo Listen" | | | | 1 | 4 | | 1 | | | 6 |
| 13 | "Hideaway" | | 3 | | 2 | 5 | | | | 5 | 15 |
| 14 | "Aziz/a" | 3 | 2 | 7 | | 3 | 5 | 5 | 6 | | 31 |
| 15 | "Heaven Sent" | 12 | 12 | 12 | 12 | 10 | 12 | 12 | 10 | 10 | 102 |
| 16 | "Lablab (Talk Talk)" | | | | | | | 4 | | | 4 |

==== Ratings ====
Viewing figures by show
| Show | Date | Viewers | Ref. |
|---|---|---|---|
| Final | 8 February 2025 | 214,000 | |

=== Controversy ===
Following Miriana Conte's win at the national final, it was speculated that the lyrics of her song "Kant" would have to be altered, as "kant" is the only Maltese word in the song, and bears a phonetic resemblance to the English-language expletive cunt. It was reported on 11 February 2025 that the song had been greenlit by the EBU. However, on 4 March, following a complaint reportedly levied by the British participating broadcaster, the BBC (in accordance with Ofcom regulations), the EBU requested the word be removed from the song and its title. This move faced backlash in Malta, including from PBS, Maltese government officials and musicians, with some labelling the move as "discriminatory" towards the Maltese language. On 13 March, PBS and Conte confirmed that the song's title was changed to "Serving" for the contest, with an accompanying music video released the following day. The Public Broadcasting Services explored legal action, claiming censorship of the Maltese language, however, it is unclear what emerged from the case as the song title was ultimately changed and the word was omitted from the song.

== At Eurovision ==
The Eurovision Song Contest 2025 took place at St. Jakobshalle in Basel, Switzerland, and consisted of two semi-finals was held on the respective dates of 13 and 15 May and the final on 17 May 2025. During the allocation draw held on 28 January 2025, Malta was drawn to compete in the second semi-final, performing in the second half of the show. Malta qualified for the final.

=== Voting ===
==== Points awarded to Malta ====
Points awarded to Malta (Semi-final 2)
| Score | Televote |
|---|---|
| 12 points | |
| 10 points | |
| 8 points | Australia |
| 7 points | Armenia |
| 6 points | Greece |
| 5 points | Israel |
| 4 points | Ireland; Montenegro |
| 3 points | Finland; Luxembourg; Rest of the World |
| 2 points | Czechia; Georgia; Serbia; United Kingdom |
| 1 point | Austria; Denmark |

Points awarded to Malta (Final)
| Score | Televote | Jury |
|---|---|---|
| 12 points | | |
| 10 points | | Austria |
| 8 points | | Australia; Germany; Israel |
| 7 points | | Finland; United Kingdom |
| 6 points | | Ireland |
| 5 points | Australia | Armenia; Italy; Latvia; Montenegro; Spain |
| 4 points | | |
| 3 points | | |
| 2 points | | Czechia |
| 1 point | Azerbaijan; Serbia; United Kingdom | San Marino; Sweden |

==== Points awarded by Malta ====
Points awarded by Malta (Semi-final 2)
| Score | Televote |
|---|---|
| 12 points | Israel |
| 10 points | Finland |
| 8 points | Greece |
| 7 points | Austria |
| 6 points | Ireland |
| 5 points | Australia |
| 4 points | Denmark |
| 3 points | Latvia |
| 2 points | Lithuania |
| 1 point | Armenia |

Points awarded by Malta (Final)
| Score | Televote | Jury |
|---|---|---|
| 12 points | Estonia | Armenia |
| 10 points | Austria | Greece |
| 8 points | Italy | France |
| 7 points | Finland | Austria |
| 6 points | Norway | Finland |
| 5 points | Israel | Spain |
| 4 points | Albania | Italy |
| 3 points | San Marino | Estonia |
| 2 points | Poland | Switzerland |
| 1 point | Sweden | Sweden |

==== Detailed voting results ====
Each participating broadcaster assembles a five-member jury panel consisting of music industry professionals who are citizens of the country they represent. Each jury, and individual jury member, is required to meet a strict set of criteria regarding professional background, as well as diversity in gender and age. No member of a national jury was permitted to be related in any way to any of the competing acts in such a way that they cannot vote impartially and independently. The individual rankings of each jury member as well as the nation's televoting results were released shortly after the grand final.

The following members comprised the Maltese jury:

- Aidan Cassar
- Michele Spiteri
- Sigmund Mifsud
- Angie Laus
- Pamela Kerr

Detailed voting results from Malta (Semi-final 2)
| R/O | Country | Televote | |
| R/O | Country | Rank | Points |
|---|---|---|---|
| 01 | Australia | 6 | 5 |
| 02 | Montenegro | 15 | |
| 03 | Ireland | 5 | 6 |
| 04 | Latvia | 8 | 3 |
| 05 | Armenia | 10 | 1 |
| 06 | Austria | 4 | 7 |
| 07 | Greece | 3 | 8 |
| 08 | Lithuania | 9 | 2 |
| 09 | Malta | | |
| 10 | Georgia | 14 | |
| 11 | Denmark | 7 | 4 |
| 12 | Czechia | 11 | |
| 13 | Luxembourg | 13 | |
| 14 | Israel | 1 | 12 |
| 15 | Serbia | 12 | |
| 16 | Finland | 2 | 10 |

Detailed voting results from Malta (Final)
| R/O | Country | Jury | | | | | | | Televote | |
| R/O | Country | Juror A | Juror B | Juror C | Juror D | Juror E | Rank | Points | Rank | Points |
|---|---|---|---|---|---|---|---|---|---|---|
| 01 | Norway | 19 | 22 | 18 | 17 | 19 | 24 | | 5 | 6 |
| 02 | Luxembourg | 11 | 18 | 16 | 12 | 8 | 13 | | 23 | |
| 03 | Estonia | 8 | 14 | 14 | 2 | 9 | 8 | 3 | 1 | 12 |
| 04 | Israel | 7 | 7 | 13 | 20 | 14 | 12 | | 6 | 5 |
| 05 | Lithuania | 24 | 21 | 17 | 21 | 22 | 25 | | 16 | |
| 06 | Spain | 6 | 4 | 7 | 13 | 4 | 6 | 5 | 14 | |
| 07 | Ukraine | 25 | 8 | 20 | 22 | 24 | 19 | | 15 | |
| 08 | United Kingdom | 12 | 16 | 23 | 19 | 21 | 20 | | 18 | |
| 09 | Austria | 4 | 5 | 6 | 6 | 3 | 4 | 7 | 2 | 10 |
| 10 | Iceland | 16 | 20 | 25 | 15 | 10 | 18 | | 21 | |
| 11 | Latvia | 21 | 13 | 19 | 24 | 18 | 22 | | 17 | |
| 12 | Netherlands | 14 | 24 | 21 | 7 | 11 | 14 | | 13 | |
| 13 | Finland | 5 | 9 | 1 | 4 | 12 | 5 | 6 | 4 | 7 |
| 14 | Italy | 18 | 3 | 9 | 8 | 6 | 7 | 4 | 3 | 8 |
| 15 | Poland | 9 | 15 | 11 | 23 | 15 | 15 | | 9 | 2 |
| 16 | Germany | 22 | 23 | 15 | 14 | 16 | 21 | | 12 | |
| 17 | Greece | 2 | 10 | 12 | 1 | 2 | 2 | 10 | 11 | |
| 18 | Armenia | 1 | 2 | 4 | 3 | 1 | 1 | 12 | 19 | |
| 19 | Switzerland | 10 | 11 | 5 | 11 | 5 | 9 | 2 | 25 | |
| 20 | Malta | | | | | | | | | |
| 21 | Portugal | 23 | 12 | 22 | 25 | 23 | 23 | | 24 | |
| 22 | Denmark | 17 | 17 | 10 | 16 | 20 | 16 | | 20 | |
| 23 | Sweden | 13 | 6 | 3 | 10 | 17 | 10 | 1 | 10 | 1 |
| 24 | France | 3 | 1 | 2 | 9 | 13 | 3 | 8 | 22 | |
| 25 | San Marino | 15 | 19 | 24 | 5 | 7 | 11 | | 8 | 3 |
| 26 | Albania | 20 | 25 | 8 | 18 | 25 | 17 | | 7 | 4 |
