= Serving cunt =

Vulgar slang term

Serving cunt is a term describing behavior that is bold, confident, and assertively feminine. It gained popularity among participants of ball culture, particularly among Black trans women and queer people, who use it to assert feminine superiority. The phrase gained mainstream popularity in the 2010s, experienced surges in the early 2020s, and became a meme in 2023.

Linguistic research on contemporary online English shows that, rather than operating as a fixed phrase, serving cunt also appears alongside related evaluative extensions such as serving cuntdom, serving cuntness, and serving cuntocracy. Studies note that these uses are highly context-dependent and reflect wider patterns of semantic change in internet-mediated language use.

== Background ==
The word cunt did not appear in the Oxford English Dictionary until 1972, having been censored out of previous editions; its most recent edition describes the word as "an exceptionally strong swear word". It is derived from either the Latin word cunnus, the Old Norse word kunta, or the Proto-Germanic word kunto. For many years, the word was perfectly acceptable and even appeared in street names and surnames; however, as blasphemy lost its power, physical and sexual phrases replaced them. Writing in May 2023, David Mack of Rolling Stone described the word as "the most offensive word in the English language" and suggested that this was due to misogynistic associations, and the sharp sounds at either end of the word. The word began to be reappropriated through ball culture, with Black trans women and queer people using it and pussy as adjectives to suggest feminine superiority.

== Popularity ==
"I think a phrase like "serving cunt" is an affirmation. It's a form of recognition of having crossed a really difficult threshold of not just a beautiful look or a really well put together face of makeup, but a bigger question. It's hitting a really high mark in terms of one's appearance, one's attitude and presence, in a way that is meant to have a positive transformation on the self. It's part of achieving a higher state of being that can be something really important for people who are queer or trans."

— Jules Gill-Peterson in May 2023

The phrase "serving cunt" became popular in the 2010s and was used to praise female celebrities and fictional characters; the phrase's first use on the internet was in the title of a 2011 YouTube video of a drag queen, "Black Queen Serves Cunt". The phrase received a further boost in 2021 after the phrase "she lived she served cunt then she died" began trending. In March and April 2023, "serving cunt" converged with the phrase "in a god-honouring way", a phrase previously used by conservative Christians. That May, Twitter users began asking how to "serve cunt" in specific situations, such as "in a way that tracks dramaturgically", "in a way that supports public transportation" or "in an academic way", and many users took the opportunity to list instances of fictional characters looking attractive during unusual events. The virality of "serving cunt" also came after the phrase "the director said cut but [insert term] heard cunt" became popular on Twitter.

Writing that month, Stephen Johnson of Lifehacker described "serving cunt" as "a celebratory phrase meaning "to be powerful in an unapologetic and feminine manner"". The following month, Mashable's Christianna Silva defined "serving cunt" as "the ability to portray great realness regardless of gender" and wrote that those doing so were "slaying beyond comparison" and Amelia Abraham of ArtReview wrote that the phrase's popularity was timely as women's rights were receding and queerphobia and transphobia were increasing. Christian Ilbury of the University of Edinburgh wrote in December 2023 that many were using it without knowledge of its roots and Rolling Stone listed it at number four on "The 21 Most Defining Memes of 2023".

Elaine Lui wrote in July 2024 that "serving cunt is one of the highest compliments you can give a person these days" and lamented the word's unpopularity with advertisers. Many people googled the phrase in February 2025 after the BBC announced that it would not play Miriana Conte's "Kant", Malta's entry for that year's Eurovision Song Contest, due to the presence of a homophone of the phrase (Maltese kant “song”, related to English chant); following a complaint from the corporation, the EBU ordered its title and lyrics changed to "Serving" for the contest.
