= London Community =

London Community may refer to:

- London Community Credit Union, a savings and loans co-operative, based in Bethnal Green
- London Community Cricket Association, trading as Cricket for Change (C4C)
- London Community Gospel Choir, founded in 1982

== See also ==
- London LGBT+ Community Pride, a community interest company formed to deliver Pride in London
- London Road Community Hospital, a hospital in Derby
