= Tileyard =

Coordinates: 51.542642°N 0.123757°W

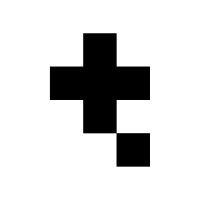

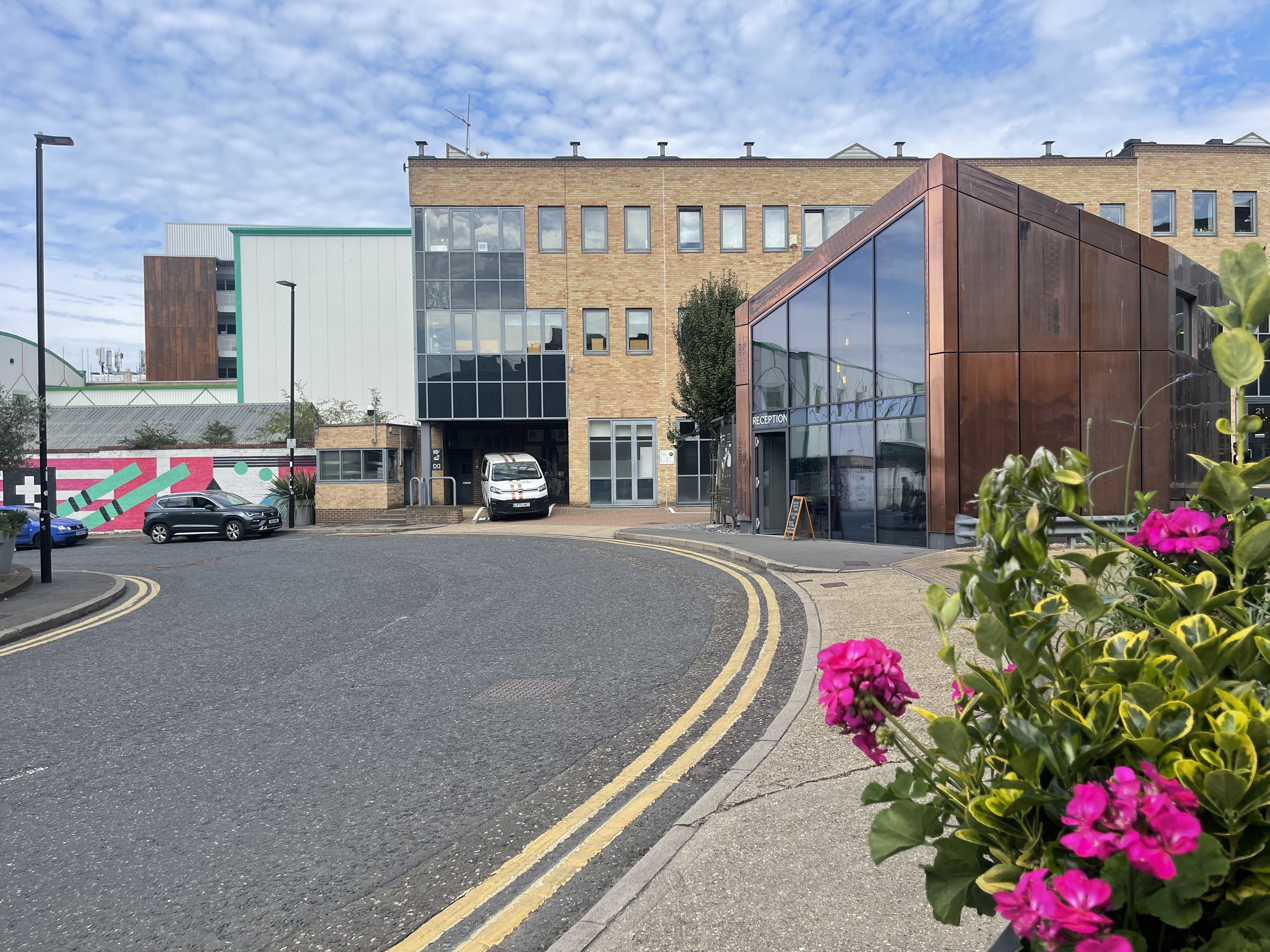
- Tileyard London - August 2024
- Industry: Music & entertainment
- Founded: June 1, 2011; 15 years ago
- Founders: Paul Kempe & Nick Keynes
- Headquarters: Kings Cross, London
- Website: tileyard.co.uk

Tileyard is a music and creative industries complex located in Kings Cross, London, United Kingdom. Established in 2011, it contains recording studios and offices used by businesses in the music and creative industries.

== History ==
Tileyard was founded in 2011 with ten studios by Paul Kempe and Nick Keynes. The community includes labels, management teams, PR agencies, creative spaces, tech startups, publishing companies, distributors, AI entrepreneurs, digital agencies, record labels, and more. Tileyard does not advertise space and securing a place relies on personal referrals.

== The Tileyard Group ==
The Tileyard group comprises Tileyard London, which includes Tileyard Music, Tileyard Education and TYX studios. In 2022, the group expanded to include Tileyard North in Wakefield, Yorkshire.

=== London ===
Tileyard Music is a record label, publishing company, and artist management team overseeing the careers of Sigala, Ella Eyre, Joel Corry, Meek and many more. Tileyard Education provides music industry education, postgraduate and undergraduate courses, songwriting camps and short courses across songwriting, production, performance and the music business, managed by Tileyard's team of industry professionals and educators. TYX Studios provides publicly accessible facilities tailored for music studio production, podcasting, photography and content creation.

=== Education ===
Tileyard Education is an Educational institution that focuses on talent incubation and skill development, integrating academic study with professional opportunity across undergraduate, postgraduate full time courses, songwriting camps and short courses.

=== North ===
Tileyard North is located in the historic Rutland Mills area of Wakefield. It replicates and expands the success of its London counterpart by creating a dynamic hub for creative industries in the North of England.

== Artists ==
Notable people who have recorded at Tileyard London include:

- Lady Gaga
- Kanye West
- Mick Jagger
- Sigala
- Dua Lipa
- Mark Ronson
- Lewis Capaldi
- Lily Allen
- Lindsay Lohan
- Noel Gallagher
- The Prodigy
- Martyn Ware

== Companies ==
Notable companies based at Tileyard London:

- Apple Music 1
- SoundCloud
- Hipgnosis
- Spitfire Audio
- Focusrite
- CD Baby
- Epicenter Mastering
