= Miriana Conte =

Maltese singer (born 2000)

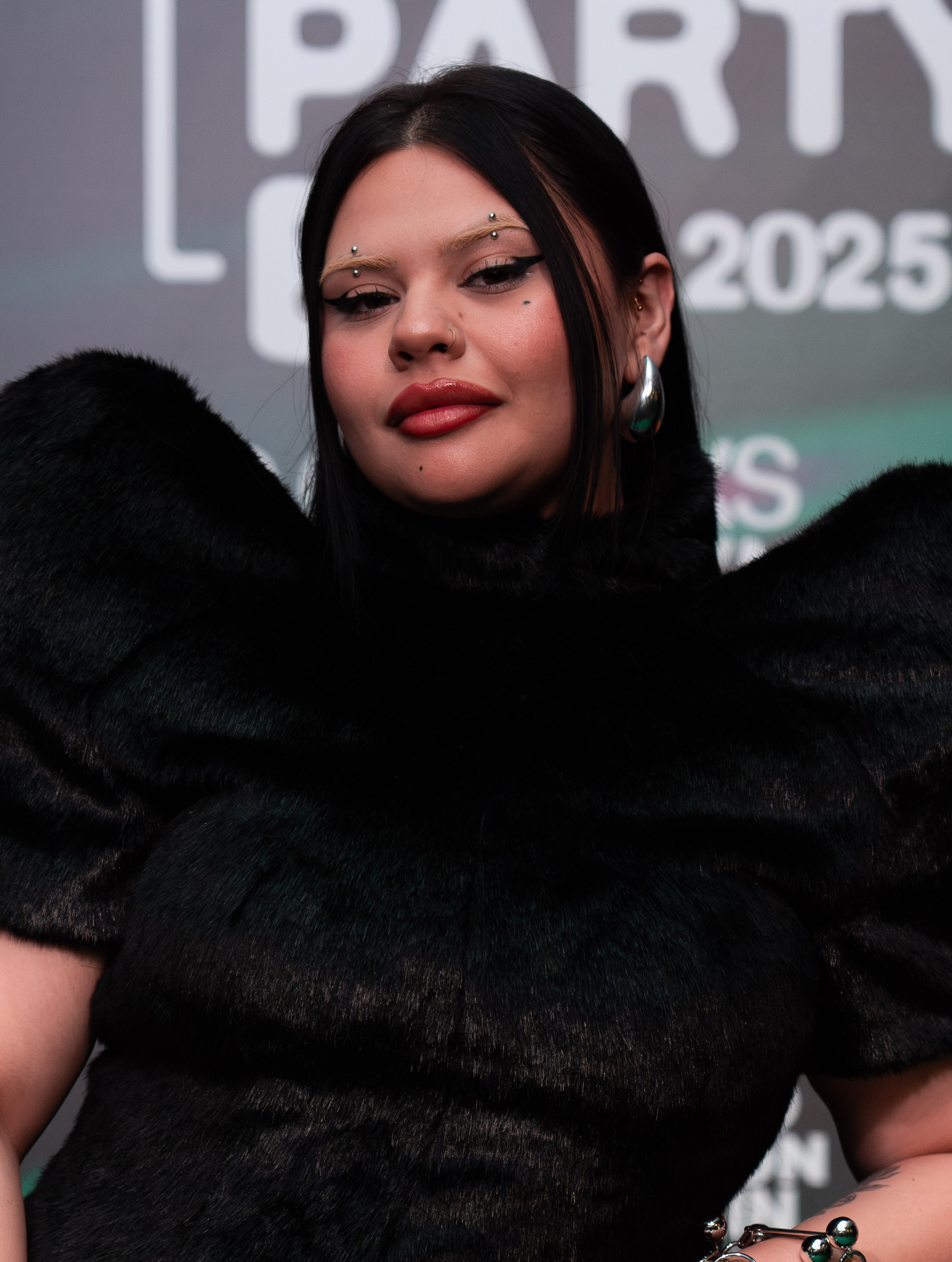
- Conte in 2025

Background information
- Born: 17 December 2000 (age 25); Qormi, Malta
- Genres: Pop
- Occupation: Singer
- Instrument: Vocals
- Years active: 2017–present
- Formerly of: 4th Line

Miriana Conte (Maltese pronunciation: [mɪrɪˈjɐːnɐ ˈkɔntɛ]; born 17 December 2000) is a Maltese singer. She represented Malta in the Eurovision Song Contest 2025.

== Career ==
On 21 December 2016, Conte was announced as one of sixteen entries selected to compete in the Malta Eurovision Song Contest 2017 with the song "Don't Look Down". There, on 18 February 2017, she finished in 16th and last place with 156 points. Conte was announced as one of sixteen entries selected to compete in the final Malta Eurovision Song Contest 2018 on 11 October 2017. She finished in 12th place with 14 points.

In 2018, Conte took part in the first edition of the Maltese version of the talent show X Factor Malta, in which she co-founded the group 4th Line, and made it to the final stage. In 2019, she left the group. In 2019, she also took part, as a soloist, in the second edition of X Factor Malta, but did not make it to the final. With a group of Maltese artists, she took part in the recording of a song titled Roll the Dice, which was the anthem of the Maltese Pride Week in 2019.

Conte participated in Malta Eurovision Song Contest 2022 with the song "Look What You've Done Now", placing 6th in the final. On 18 October 2023, she was announced among the participants of Malta Eurovision Song Contest 2024 with the song "Venom", later being drawn to perform in the fourth and final show of the semi-final stage on 17 November. At the end of the round, in late November, it was announced that she was among the qualifiers for the final on 3 February 2024. There, she finished ninth overall with 25 points.

On 12 December 2024, it was announced that Conte was one of 24 semi-finalist entries who were selected for Malta Eurovision Song Contest 2025 with the song "Kant". Having qualified in the second semi-final, she won the televoting in the final and came first overall with 182 points, being selected to represent Malta in the Eurovision Song Contest 2025. Following a complaint reportedly levied by the British participating broadcaster, the BBC (in accordance with Ofcom regulations), the EBU requested the word be removed from the song and its title. This move faced backlash in Malta, including from PBS, Maltese government officials and musicians, with some labelling the move as discriminatory towards the Maltese language. On 13 March, PBS and Conte confirmed that the song's title was changed to "Serving" for the contest, with an accompanying music video released the following day. She qualified to the Grand Final from the second semi-final on 15 May. In the Grand Final on 17 May, her song placed 17th out of 26, with 91 points, 83 of which came from the professional jury.

== Personal life ==
Conte is half-Italian; her father comes from Naples and works as a businessman. She was diagnosed with ADHD in 2023. Conte is queer and, as of May 2025, is in a relationship with Maltese footballer Jade Flask.

== Discography ==
=== Studio albums ===
| Title | Details |
|---|---|
| Overstimulated | Released: 16 January 2026; Label: Self-released; Format: Digital download, streaming |

=== Singles ===
==== As lead artist ====
| Title | Year | Peak chart positions | | | | | | | | Album |
| Title | Year | MLT Air. | MLT Dom. Air. | GRE Intl. | LTU | SWE | SWI | UK Digital | UK Sales | Album |
|---|---|---|---|---|---|---|---|---|---|---|
| "Don't Look Down" | 2017 | — | — | — | — | — | — | — | — | Non-album singles |
| "Rocket" | 2018 | — | — | — | — | — | — | — | — | Non-album singles |
| "Look What You've Done Now" | 2022 | — | — | — | — | — | — | — | — | Non-album singles |
| "Venom" | 2024 | — | — | — | — | — | — | — | — | Non-album singles |
| "Serving" | 2025 | 1 | 1 | 56 | 47 | 90 | 75 | 38 | 39 | Overstimulated |
| "Għajjejt (i8)" | 2025 | — | 1 | — | — | — | — | — | — | Overstimulated |
| "Napoletana" | 2025 | — | 9 | — | — | — | — | — | — | Overstimulated |
| "What the Helena?" (with Mychael Bartolo Chircop) | 2026 | — | 2 | — | — | — | — | — | — | Non-album single |
"—" denotes a recording that did not chart or was not released in that territory.

==== As featured artist ====
| Title | Year | Album |
|---|---|---|
| "Paréa" (Evangelia featuring Miriana Conte and Kiki) | 2026 | Paréa: The Prelude |

== Awards and nominations ==
| Year | Award | Category | Nominee(s) | Result | Ref. |
|---|---|---|---|---|---|
| 2025 | Eurovision Awards | Miss Congeniality | Herself | Won | |
| 2025 | Eurovision Awards | Music Video | Herself | Won | |

Awards and achievements
| Preceded by Sarah Bonnici with "Loop" | Malta in the Eurovision Song Contest; 2025 | Succeeded by Aidan with "Bella" |
