= Big Gay Out (London) =

LGBT community event in Finsbury Park, London

Coordinates: 51.5712°N 0.1009°W

The Big Gay Out was a short-lived live popular music event, dance party, and funfair for the LGBT community in Finsbury Park, London. It was held twice, in 2004 as part of London's Gay Pride, and again in 2005 separately from London Pride. There was no Big Gay Out in 2006 due to the Europride celebrations, and a third event planned for 2007 was never held. A portion of the profits made went to charities including Stonewall.

== 2004 event ==
The first Big Gay Out music festival held in Finsbury Park was hosted as part of London's Pride events, following the parade. The event had 45 artists scheduled to perform, including the Sugababes, Jamelia and Peter André, along with more than 50 DJs. It also featured an outdoor dance stage cabaret tent and a beach bar.

== 2005 event ==
The 2005 Big Gay Out aimed to gather 30,000 people, had "12 stages and tents, jacuzzis, swimming pools, a beach island, a giant outdoor foam party, fireworks" and so on, and was joined by many reformed bands and come-back artists, including:

- McFly
- The Wurzels
- The Cuban Brothers
- Terri Walker
- Blazin' Squad
- Do Me Bad Things
- Tony Christie
- Jayme Ephraim
- Peter André
- Lemar
- Carnaval Collection
- Beverley Knight
- Sunset Strippers
- Bananarama
- The Porcelain Twinz
- Jenny Frost
- Killa Kela
- The Human League
- Electric Six
- Girls Aloud
- Frankie Goes to Hollywood

Goldfrapp performed in the Popstarz tent

Babyshambles were scheduled to appear but, not entirely unexpectedly, did not show up.

Contestants of the popular show Playing It Straight also made an appearance, as did the 2005 Mr Gay UK finalists. Graham Norton also appeared introducing some acts.
