= Serving (song) =

2025 song by Miriana Conte

- Single cover for the song's re-release

Single by Miriana Conte

from the album Overstimulated
- Released: 8 January 2025
- Genre: Pop
- Length: 2:59
- Label: Manifester; Sony Music Sweden
- Songwriters: Benjamin Schmid; Miriana Conte; Matthew Mercieca; Sarah Evelyn Fullerton
- Producer: Benjamin Schmid

Miriana Conte singles chronology
"Venom" (2024)	"Serving" (2025)	"Għajjejt (i8)" (2025)

Music video
- "Serving" on YouTube

Eurovision Song Contest 2025 entry
- Country: Malta
- Artist: Miriana Conte
- Language: English
- Composers: Benjamin Schmid; Sarah Evelyn Fullerton; Matthew Mercieca; Miriana Conte
- Lyricists: Benjamin Schmid; Sarah Evelyn Fullerton; Matthew Mercieca; Miriana Conte

Finals performance
- Semi-final result: 9th
- Semi-final points: 53
- Final result: 17th
- Final points: 91

Entry chronology
- ◄ "Loop" (2024)
- "Bella" (2026) ►

Alternative cover
- Malta Eurovision Song Contest 2025 single cover, featuring the song's original title

"Serving", originally titled "Kant" (Maltese pronunciation: [ˈkɐnt]; transl. Singing) and also "Serving Kant", is a song by Maltese singer Miriana Conte. It was written by Conte alongside Benjamin "BNJI" Schmid, Sarah Evelyn Fullerton (Sarah Lake), and Matthew Mercieca (Muxu), with production handled by Schmid. It was released on 8 January 2025, and represented Malta in the Eurovision Song Contest 2025.

== Background and composition ==
"Serving" was written and composed by Miriana Conte, Matthew "Muxu" Mercieca, Sarah Evelyn Fullerton and Benjamin "Bnji" Schmid, the latter of whom also handled production. It contains heavy use of the Arabian riff in its prechorus.

The original title of the song, Kant, which in Maltese means "singing", is repeated in the chorus through a pun that recalls the expression serving cunt, used to describe a bold and self-confident person in queer and drag cultures. Scott Mills, host for BBC Radio 2, said that BBC Radio "definitely can't play" the song. In an interview with TVM, Conte initially said that the European Broadcasting Union (EBU) had accepted the song as it was and that its lyrics would not be changed, but that the song would be revamped.

On 4 March 2025, Maltese broadcaster PBS stated that the EBU forbade the term kant from being used on stage and demanded changes to the song's lyrics, after the British broadcaster BBC reportedly levied a complaint in accordance with Ofcom regulations. On 13 March, the song's title was changed to "Serving" for the contest. The new version of the song omits the word kant and replaces it with the sound "aahh".

== Eurovision Song Contest ==
=== Malta Eurovision Song Contest 2025 ===
Malta Eurovision Song Contest 2025 was the national final format developed by PBS to select its entry for the Eurovision Song Contest 2025. The competition consisted of two semi-finals and a final held between 4 and 8 February 2025 at the Malta Fairs and Conventions Centre in Ta' Qali. The format of the competition consisted of twenty-four competing songs. Two semi-finals with twelve songs each took place on 4 and 6 February 2025 where the top eight entries qualified from each semi-final to compete in the final on 8 February 2025. Nine judges and the public via televoting evaluated the songs during the shows, both of which had an equal stake (50%) in the final result. Ties in the final results were broken based on the entry which received the higher score from the public.

Conte was announced as a participant on 12 December 2024. Her song was drawn to perform fourth in the second semi-final, and qualified on 6 February. In the final, Conte performed in first and won the competition with 182 points. She placed second in the jury vote and first in the televote.

=== At Eurovision ===
The Eurovision Song Contest 2025 took place at St. Jakobshalle in Basel, Switzerland, and consisted of two semi-finals to be held on the respective dates of 13 and 15 May and the final on 17 May 2025. During the allocation draw held on 28 January 2025, Malta was drawn to compete in the second semi-final, performing in the second half of the show. Malta finished 9th out of 16 countries competing in the semi-final with 53 points, qualifying for the final.

Malta came 17th in the Grand Final with 91 points—83 from the juries and 8 from the public.

== Track listing ==
Digital download and streaming – "Kant"

1. "Kant" – 2:59

Digital download and streaming – "Serving"

1. "Serving" (Official Eurovision version) – 2:59
2. "Serving Kant" – 2:59
3. "Serving" (Instrumental version) – 2:59

Digital download and streaming – "Serving Kant"

1. "Serving Kant" – 2:59

== Charts ==
=== Weekly charts ===
Weekly chart performance for "Kant"
Chart (2025)	Peak position
Greece International (IFPI)	86
Malta Airplay (Radiomonitor)	1
Malta Domestic Airplay (BMAT PRS)	1

Chart performance for "Serving"
Chart (2025)	Peak position
Greece International (IFPI)	56
Lithuania (AGATA)	47
Malta Airplay (Radiomonitor)	2
Sweden (Sverigetopplistan)	90
Switzerland (Schweizer Hitparade)	75
UK Singles Downloads (Official Charts)	38
UK Singles Sales (OCC)	39

=== Year-end charts ===
Year-end chart performance for "Kant"
Chart (2025)	Peak position
Malta Domestic Airplay (BMAT PRS)	1

== Release history ==
Release history and formats for "Serving"
Region	Date	Version(s)	Format(s)	Label	Ref.
Various	8 January 2025	Original (Note: Official release of "Kant" for the Malta Eurovision Song Contest 2025. Later re-released as "Serving Kant" along with the release of "Serving".)	Digital download; streaming	Manifester Music	
Various	23 April 2025	Original (Note: Official release of "Serving", also subtitled as the "Eurovision Official Version".); instrumental; "Serving Kant"	Digital download; streaming	Sony Music Sweden	
