= London Community Credit Union =

Financial co-operative in the United Kingdom (2000–2025)

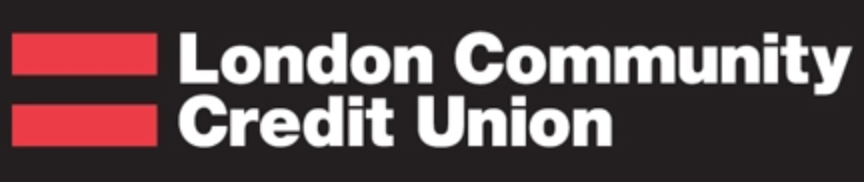
- Founded: 11 December 2000
- Dissolved: 22 January 2025
- Type: Industrial and Provident Society
- Location(s): London, E2; United Kingdom
- Website: londoncu.com

London Community Credit Union Limited was a member-owned and led financial co-operative, operating in the London boroughs of Hackney, Haringey, Islington, Newham, Tower Hamlets, Waltham Forest and the City of London. It had over 17,000 members and 4 branch offices in Bethnal Green, Poplar, Hackney and Stratford.

== History ==
Tower Hamlets Community Credit Union was established in 2000 to serve as part of the council's anti-poverty initiative. A year later, the credit union was recognised as the fastest growing in the UK and became a major partner in the Department for Work and Pensions Growth Fund which promoted improved and affordable access to credit for financially marginalised groups.

In 2010, following expansion into Hackney and surrounding boroughs, Tower Hamlets Credit Union adopted the present name. The smaller Forest Gate (ELWA) Credit Union was formed in 2003, becoming NewCred Community Credit Union in 2005. In late 2014, under pressure from the Prudential Regulation Authority due to falling below minimum reserves requirements, NewCred members voted to transfer engagements to London Community Credit Union. The credit union was awarded a grant of £100,000 by the Lloyds Banking Group Credit Union Development Fund to support its reserves and enable it to proceed with the merger plans.

London Community Credit Union's original branch in Roman Road, Bow, closed its doors on 31 December 2019.

London Community Credit Union ceased trading on 22 January 2025.

== Activities ==
Members savings are pooled together and used as a common fund from which they can apply for lower cost loans. Interest earned on these loans is the credit union's main source of income and is used to provide services and pay dividends based on shares.

Forming part of the wider international co-operative movement, there are now 51,000 credit unions in 100 countries, enabling 196 million members to access affordable financial services. The credit union movement in the UK is less developed than other parts of the world, although the sector is growing and there are currently 580, varying in size, membership and services. All members of a credit union must share a common bond. In the case of London Community Credit Union, membership is restricted to individuals living, working or studying in the City of London and London boroughs of Tower Hamlets, Hackney, Newham, Waltham Forest, Islington and Haringey. Relatives living with an existing member are also eligible to join.

=== Products ===
London Community Credit Union offers savings, loans and current accounts. In addition to its main "SaverPlus" account in which members are encouraged to save regularly, it offers a Holiday Saver and a Christmas Planner. Withdrawals are restricted from these savings accounts to help members achieve their saving goals.

In 2017 London Community Credit Union launched its own range of current accounts. It offers four option to meet the daily banking needs of members. The top, Gold and Platinum accounts come with a contactless Mastercard debit card.

London Community Credit Union's JamJar accounts are designed for those who need a little extra help with budgeting. For a monthly £3 fee, members can ring-fence money and ensure it is used to pay bills and essential expenses. This money is kept in a separate pot or "jamjar" from everyday spending money.

London Community Credit Union offers a payroll deduction savings and loans scheme in conjunction with the London boroughs of Tower Hamlets, Newham, Hackney, a number of housing associations and community organisations. The credit union is responsible for the operation of the scheme, with the employer facilitating monthly deductions from salary.

Unlike a bank, interest is not paid on savings accounts as profits are shared among members at the end of each year in the form of a dividend payment. Credit unions abide by the democratic principle of one member, one vote, so that all members enjoy an equal say. Members are encouraged to attend the Annual General Meeting and vote on issues, including the election of the board of directors, all of whom serve on a voluntary basis.

London Community Credit Union is authorised by the Prudential Regulation Authority (PRA) and regulated by the Financial Conduct Authority and PRA. Ultimately, like the banks and building societies, members' savings are protected against business failure by the Financial Services Compensation Scheme.

== See also ==
- Credit unions in the United Kingdom
- British co-operative movement
