= Sarah Bonnici =

Maltese singer (born 1998)

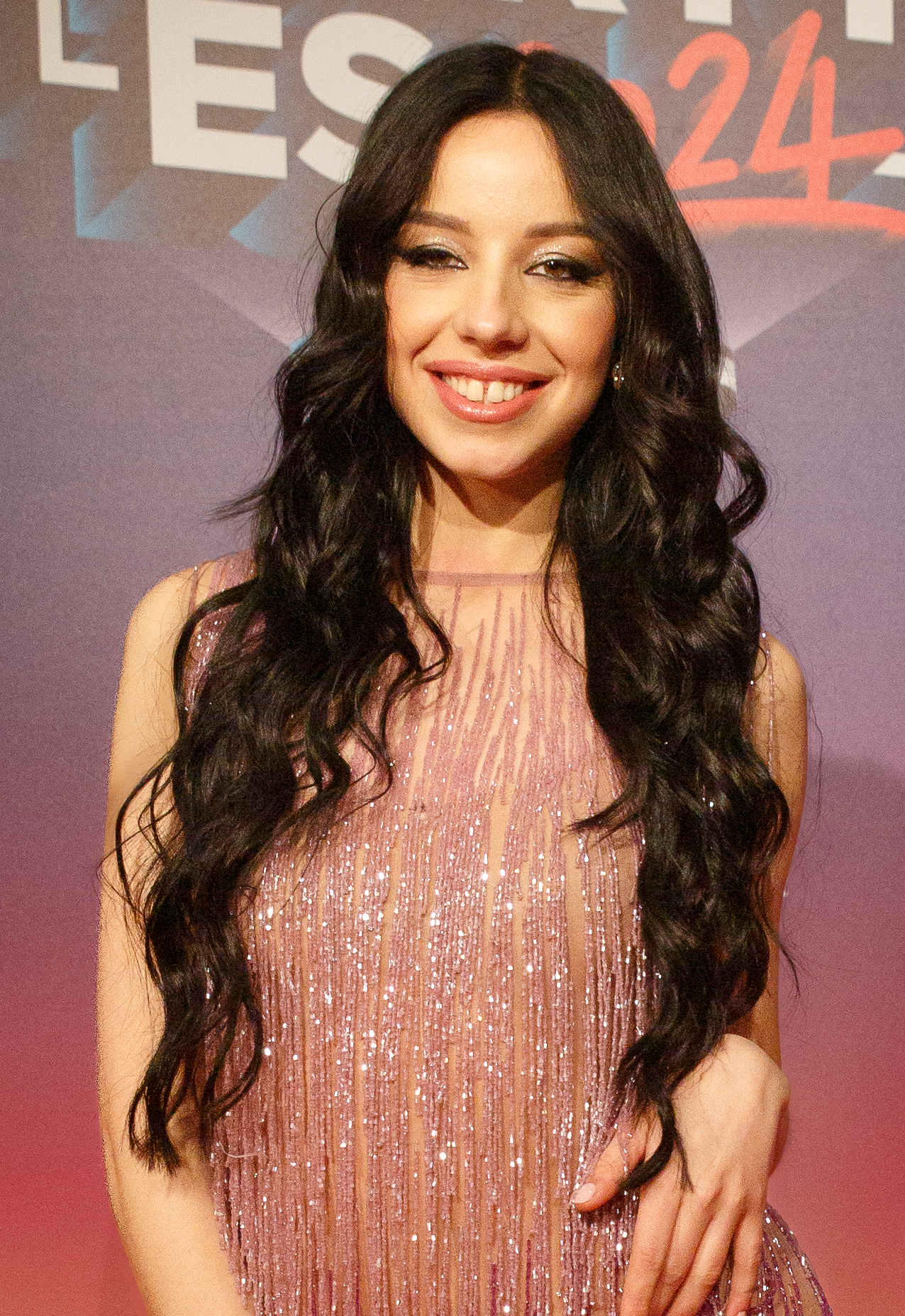
- Bonnici in 2024

Background information
- Born: Sarah Bonnici; 30 May 1998 (age 28); Xagħra, Gozo, Malta
- Genres: Pop
- Occupation: Singer
- Years active: 2009–present

Sarah Bonnici (Maltese pronunciation: [ˈsɐrɐ bɔˈnːiːt͡ʃɪ]; born 30 May 1998) is a Maltese singer. She represented Malta in the Eurovision Song Contest 2024 with the song "Loop".

== Early and personal life ==
Bonnici was born in Xaghra, Gozo. She is the daughter of Marcel Bonnici, CEO of Mercury Tower and Ħamrun Spartans. She has a master's degree in accounting and finance.

== Career ==
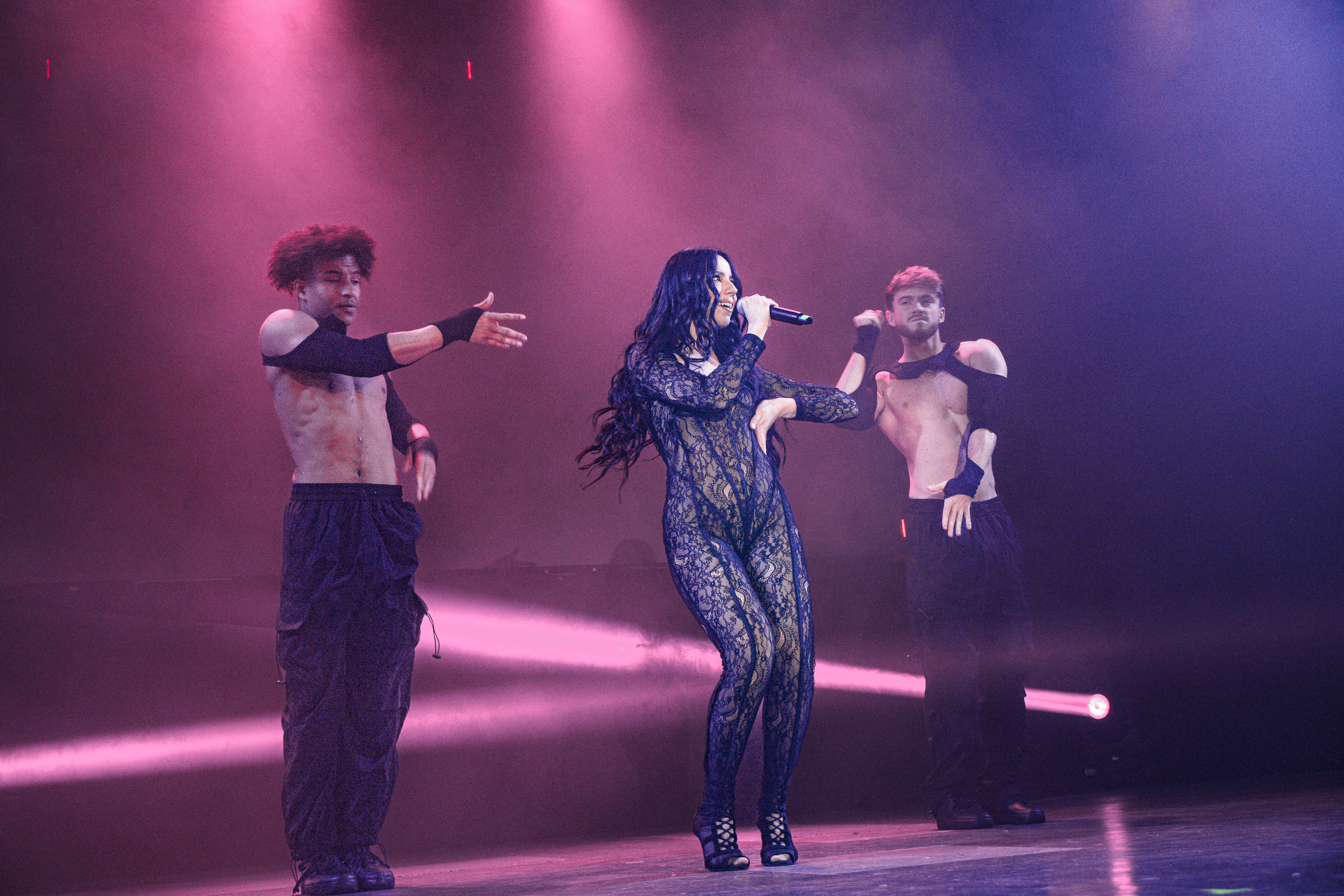
Sarah Bonnici performing in Madrid during PrePartyES 2024

Bonnici was mentored by Miriam Christine from a young age. In 2009, she competed in Malta Junior Eurovision Song Contest, the national selection for the Junior Eurovision Song Contest 2009, with "The Mambo Song", finishing in third place. The following year, she won the 4th edition of L-Għanja Tal-Maltin Song Festival, placing first in her age group with a song written by Miriam Christine and winning Best Voice within the same contest. In 2010, she participated in Malta Junior Eurovision Song Contest placing 7th with the song "Kitty Kitty Cat". This appearance gave her the opportunity to join Malta's representative Nicole Azzopardi, as a dancer, at the 2010 Junior Eurovision Song Contest.

Throughout her teenage years she participated in several international song competitions outside her native Malta, including the Trixie Festival in Bulgaria, the Carpathians Star Festival in Romania, and the Star to Born Festival Hungary. Bonnici placed first in her category at the Ti Amo Festival in Romania and also won the Original Song Category with the song "Vivrà ancora". She won the "New Talent" section of the Festival Kanzunetta Indipendenza in 2012, and the main category of the festival in 2018. Shortly after, she participated in the first edition of X Factor Malta.

Bonnici participated in Malta Eurovision Song Contest 2022 with "Heaven" written by Aidan, placing 12th in the final. On 18 October 2023, she was announced among the participants of Malta Eurovision Song Contest 2024 with the song "Loop", later being drawn to perform in the first show of the semi-final stage on 27 October. At the end of the round, in late November, it was announced that she was among the qualifiers for the final on 3 February 2024. The final of the Malta Eurovision Song Contest was held at the Public Broadcasting Services studios without a live audience. There, she won the jury voting, obtained full marks from 5 of the 6 jurors, and came first overall with 102 points, being selected to represent Malta in the Eurovision Song Contest 2024. Bonnici failed to qualify from the second semi-final on 9 May 2024, placing 16th out of 16 with 13 points.

== Discography ==
=== Extended plays ===
| Title | Details |
|---|---|
| Something I Had to Lose | Released: 29 June 2026; Label: Self-released; Format: Digital download, streaming |

=== Singles ===
| Title | Year | Peak chart positions | Album or EP |
| Title | Year | MLT Dom. Air. | Album or EP |
|---|---|---|---|
| "Bandwagon" | 2015 | — | Non-album singles |
| "Breathe Your Love" | 2017 | — | Non-album singles |
| "Il-Pinna" | 2018 | — | Non-album singles |
| "Heaven" | 2022 | — | Non-album singles |
| "Never Ever" | 2023 | — | Non-album singles |
| "Loop" | 2024 | 1 | Non-album singles |
| "Hold Me Closer" | 2024 | — | Non-album singles |
| "Lose" | 2024 | 4 | Non-album singles |
| "Love You Like That" | 2024 | 7 | Non-album singles |
| "Is This How It Ends?" | 2025 | — | Non-album singles |
"—" denotes a recording that did not chart or was not released in that territory.

=== Other charted songs ===
| Title | Year | Peak chart positions | Album or EP |
| Title | Year | MLT Dom. Air. | Album or EP |
|---|---|---|---|
| "Barry" | 2026 | 2 | Something I Had to Lose |

Awards and achievements
| Preceded by The Busker with "Dance (Our Own Party)" | Malta in the Eurovision Song Contest; 2024 | Succeeded by Miriana Conte with "Serving" |
