= Pride in London =

Annual LGBTQ event in London, England

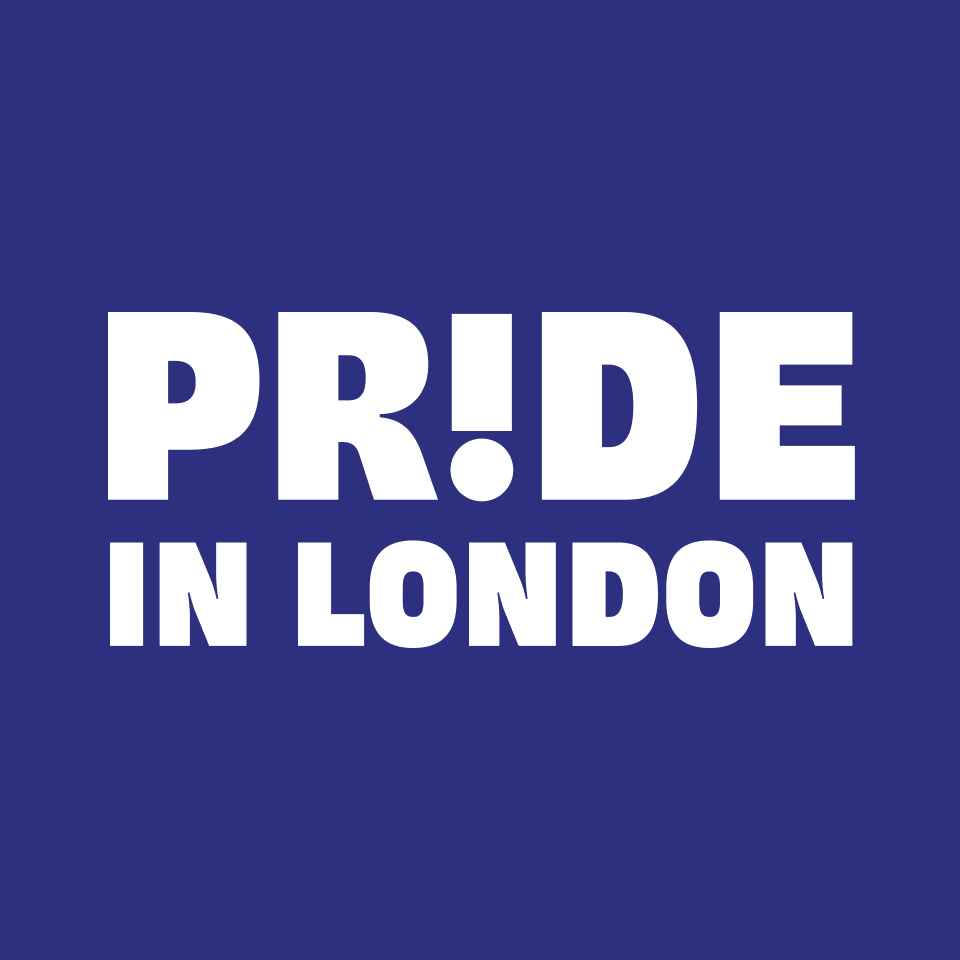
- Pride in London Logo

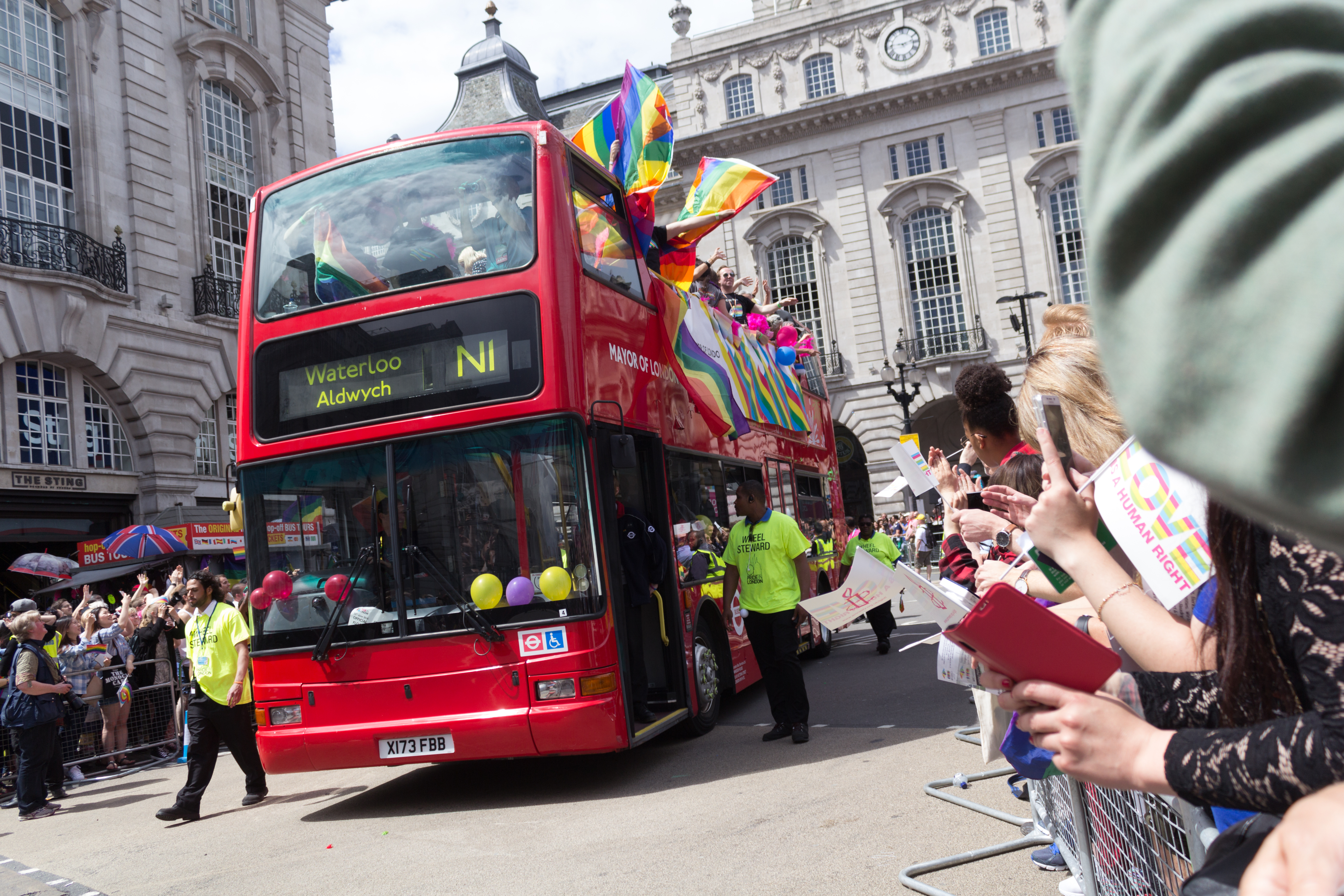
- A bus as part of the 2016 parade
- Formerly: Pride London
- Type: Community Interest Company
- Predecessor: Gay Liberation Front (GLF)
- Founded: 1972; 54 years ago
- Headquarters: London
- Area served: London, Greater London
- Revenue: £1.4m
- Number of employees: 4
- Parent: LONDON LGBT COMMUNITY PRIDE C.I.C.
- Website: https://prideinlondon.org

Pride in London is an annual LGBTQ+ pride festival and pride parade held each summer in London, England. The event, formerly run by Pride London, is sometimes referred to as London Pride.

Pride in London celebrates the diversity of LGBTQ+ communities with the Pride in London Parade, as well as free events that take place in Trafalgar Square and other areas in central London. This event aims to bring together people of all genders, ethnicities, sexualities, and races.

Pride in London is among the longest running pride festivals in the United Kingdom. In recent years, the event has included more than 35,000 participants representing over 500 groups, and has attracted an estimated 1.5 million attendees. The festival's programme and route vary annually, with events held at different locations across London.

== History ==
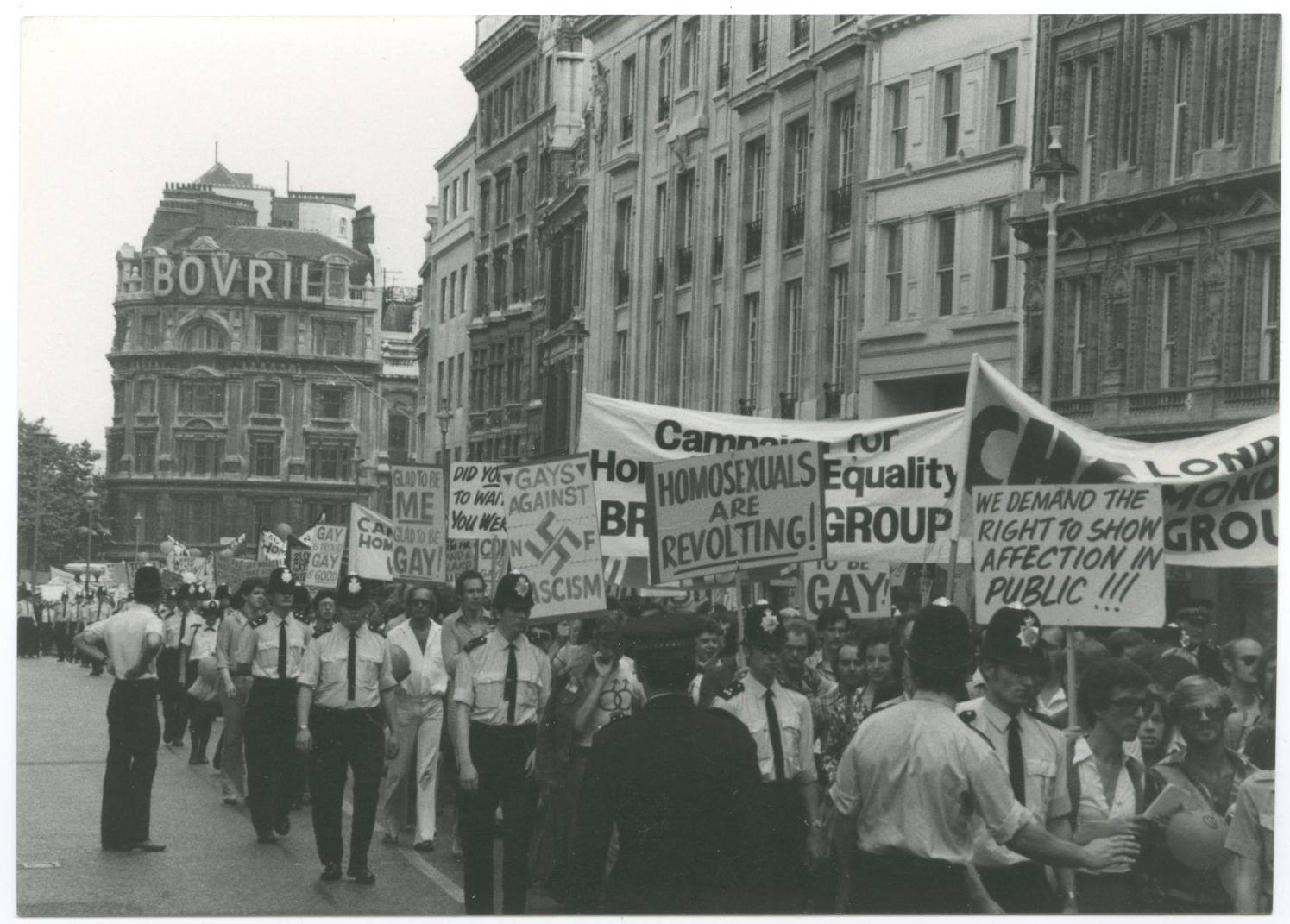
Gay Pride march on Cockspur Street, 1974

The UK's first public gay pride event took place in November 1970, with around 150 men walking through Highbury Fields in North London. The first official pride march was held in London two years later, with approximately 200 participants; it was held on 1 July 1972 coinciding with the nearest Saturday to the anniversary of the Stonewall riots of 1969. In 1971, the Gay Liberation Front (GLF) youth group organised an age of consent rally in London.

In 1981, the Pride march and rally were relocated from London to Huddersfield as an act of solidarity with the Yorkshire gay community who were facing harassment by the West Yorkshire Police. The harassment consisted of police surveillance and repeated raids of the popular Gemini Club which the police referred to as a "cesspit of filth".

In 1985, representatives from mining groups joined the Lesbians and Gays Support the Miners group (LGSM) on the march. This was in recognition of the support given to striking miners by LGSM.

In 1988, the controversial Section 28 led to increased attendance to the march in protest.

Since 1983, the march had been called "Lesbian and Gay Pride" and by the 1990s it became more of a carnival event, with large park gatherings and a fair after the marches. In 1996, following a vote by the members of the Pride Trust, the event was renamed "Lesbian, Gay, Bisexual and Transgender Pride" and became the largest free music festival in Europe.

In 1992, London was selected to hold the first EuroPride event with attendance put at 100,000. London again held EuroPride in 2006 with an estimated 600,000 participants.

In 1998, the Pride Trust became insolvent and no event was organised that year, some believed that this was partially due to a decision to make the event ticketed.

For the next few years, another commercial organisation ran what it called 'London Mardi Gras' before it failed to pay its bill for the use of Hyde Park and was unable to run any more events without clearing the debt.

=== Pride London (2004–2012) ===
'Pride London' was formed in 2004, and was awarded registered charity status. Since then, a political rally in Trafalgar Square has been held straight after the parade, and more recently Pride London has organised several other events in the centre of London on Pride Day including the Big Gay Out music festival in Finsbury Park in 2004, and in 2006 'Drag Idol' in Leicester Square, a women's stage in Soho and a party in Soho Square.

==== WorldPride London 2012 ====
At an October 2008 conference in Vancouver, InterPride accepted a bid from Pride London to host WorldPride 2012. Running from 23rd June to 8th July (with the parade on the 7th July), this was to coincide with the London Olympic and Paralympic Games, and the year-long celebrations of The Queen's Diamond Jubilee. Pride London planned a parade with floats, a large performance area in Trafalgar Square, with street parties in Golden Square and Soho.

However, a major sponsor withdrew support, leading to the charity being unable to raise the funds necessary. Consequently, the entertainment and stages were all cut, and licence applications for street parties in Soho were withdrawn. Instead, the event plans included a Pride Walk (without floats or vehicles) and a scaled-back rally in Trafalgar Square. During this event, the first International Asexual Conference was held.

On 5 July, the Metropolitan Police issued a licence regulations notice to all venues in Soho, reminding them that Pride London now has no licence for street events in the Soho area, and therefore, venues should treat WorldPride as "any normal day". This led to the closure of the Pride London charity in the days which followed the 2012 event.

== London LGBT+ Community Pride (2012–present) ==
In October 2012, a group of individuals from within the LGBTQ community formed London LGBT+ Community Pride, a registered community interest company. After a bidding process organised by the Mayor of London in October 2012, the London LGBT+ Community Pride was awarded a five-year contract and a grant worth £650,000 (or £500,000) in January by the Greater London Authority to deliver the annual pride celebrations within London. Since then, they have continued to organise and expand the Pride in London event each year.

The event hosts a range of stages during the event. In 2018, the event saw 4 stages hosted in Trafalgar Square, Leicester Square and Soho.

Some years there would be an official London Pride song. In 2019, for example, this was Dance Like Nobody's watching by Finnish singer Saara Aalto.

=== COVID-19 disruption (2020–2021) ===
The 2020 parade (titled #YouMeUsWe) was scheduled for 27 June 2020. In March 2020, it was postponed, with no new date announced, due to the COVID-19 pandemic. However, Gay rights activists from Clapham arranged a gathering on Clapham Common to celebrate Pride 2020. This gathering turned into a large party with pop-up performances, temporary tattoos, sing-alongs and rainbow flags. It was penned by BBC News as an illegal rave and was shut down by police at 11pm. There were no arrests.

On 26 February 2021, it was announced that Pride in London would be going ahead on the weekend of 11 September 2021. In August 2021, the event was cancelled in full due to COVID-19, stating that final risk assessments would not allow the parade to be held. This is despite the lifting of most COVID-19 restrictions in England.

=== 50th anniversary of the Pride march in London (2022) ===
After two years of cancelled events due to COVID-19 restrictions, the 2022 parade occurred on 2 July 2022. 2022 marked the 50th anniversary of the inaugural Pride march within London organised by the Gay Liberation Front in 1972. The parade was led by members of the GLF who had attended the 1972 parade.

=== #FreedomTo social media campaign (2014) ===
The theme of the 2014 pride was #FreedomTo.People were asked to submit what #FreedomTo meant to them using an image of themselves with their message formed part of the first Pride in London advertising campaign. Celebrities and members of the LGBTQ community were also shown on adverts on the London Underground and London buses. The advertising campaign ran for 2 weeks prior to Pride on 28 June 2014.

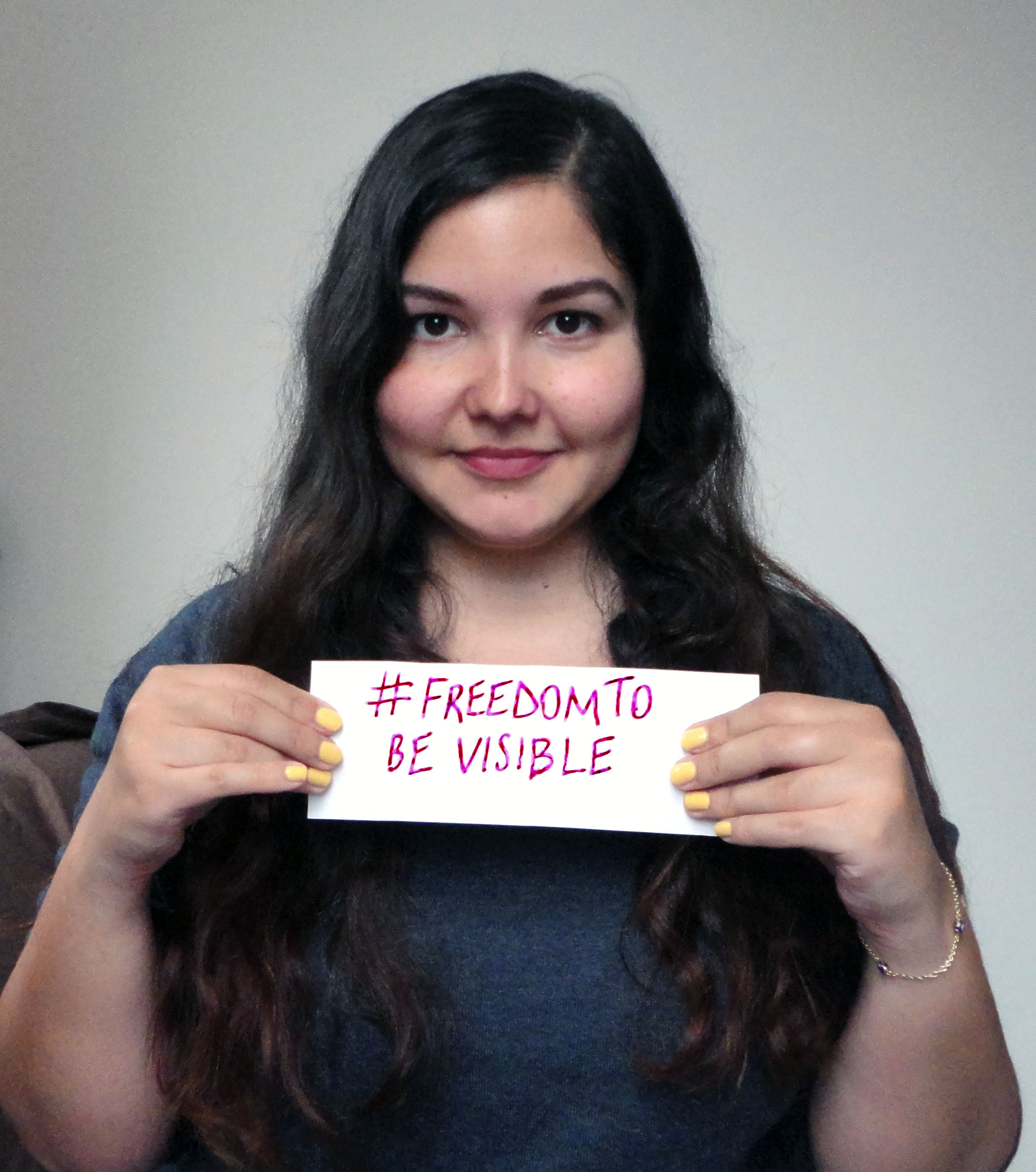

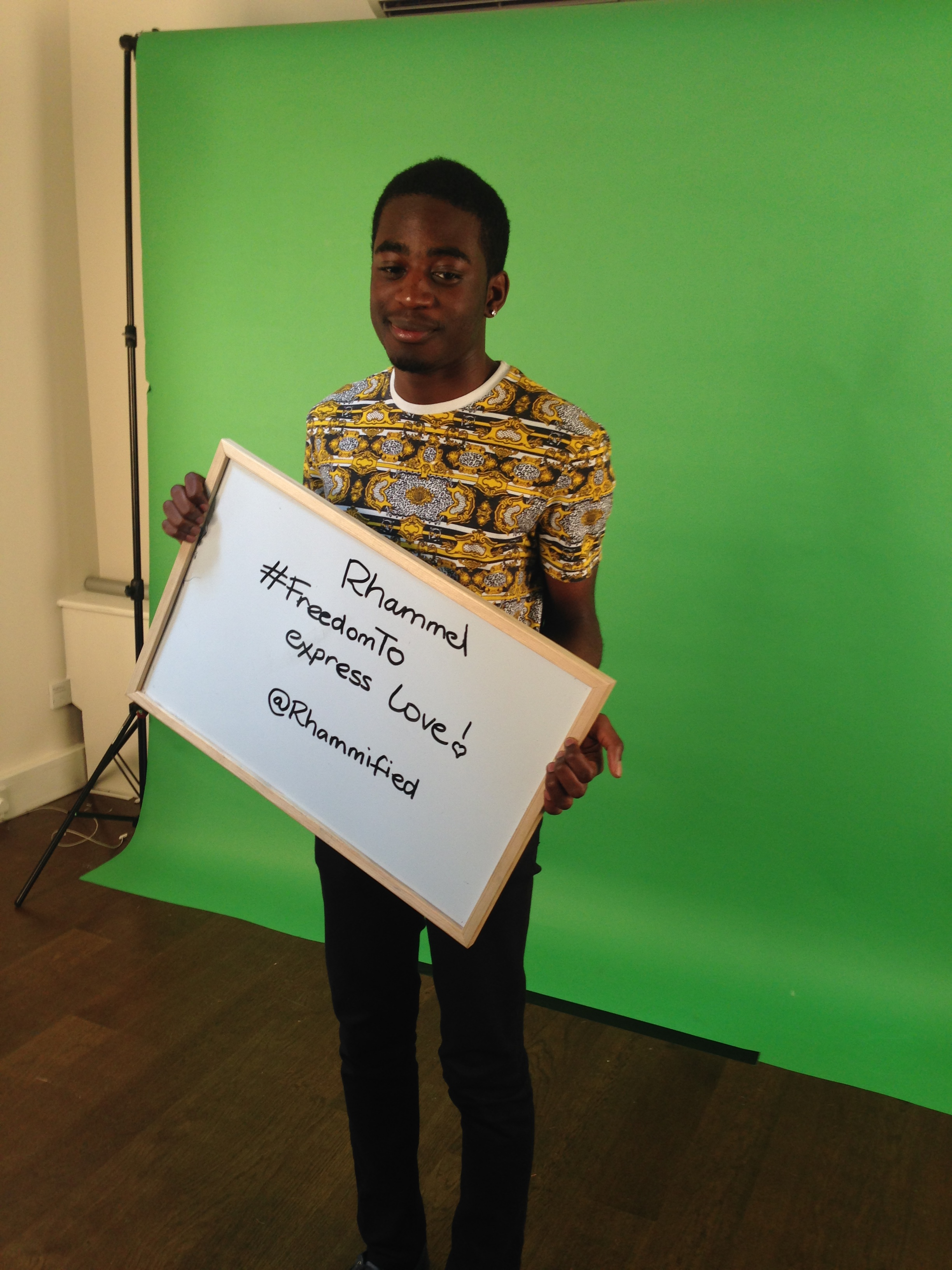

=== Response to the Orlando nightclub shooting (2016) ===
There was heightened security put in place for this event as the Orlando nightclub shooting had occurred earlier in the month. Following the attack, Pride in London reported a surge in support and said "it will be a celebration and commemoration. So many people have got in touch to say that they want to show their support after Orlando." A minute's silence was observed in remembrance. Up to one million people were expected to attend and the parade consisted over nearly 300 groups.

== Route ==
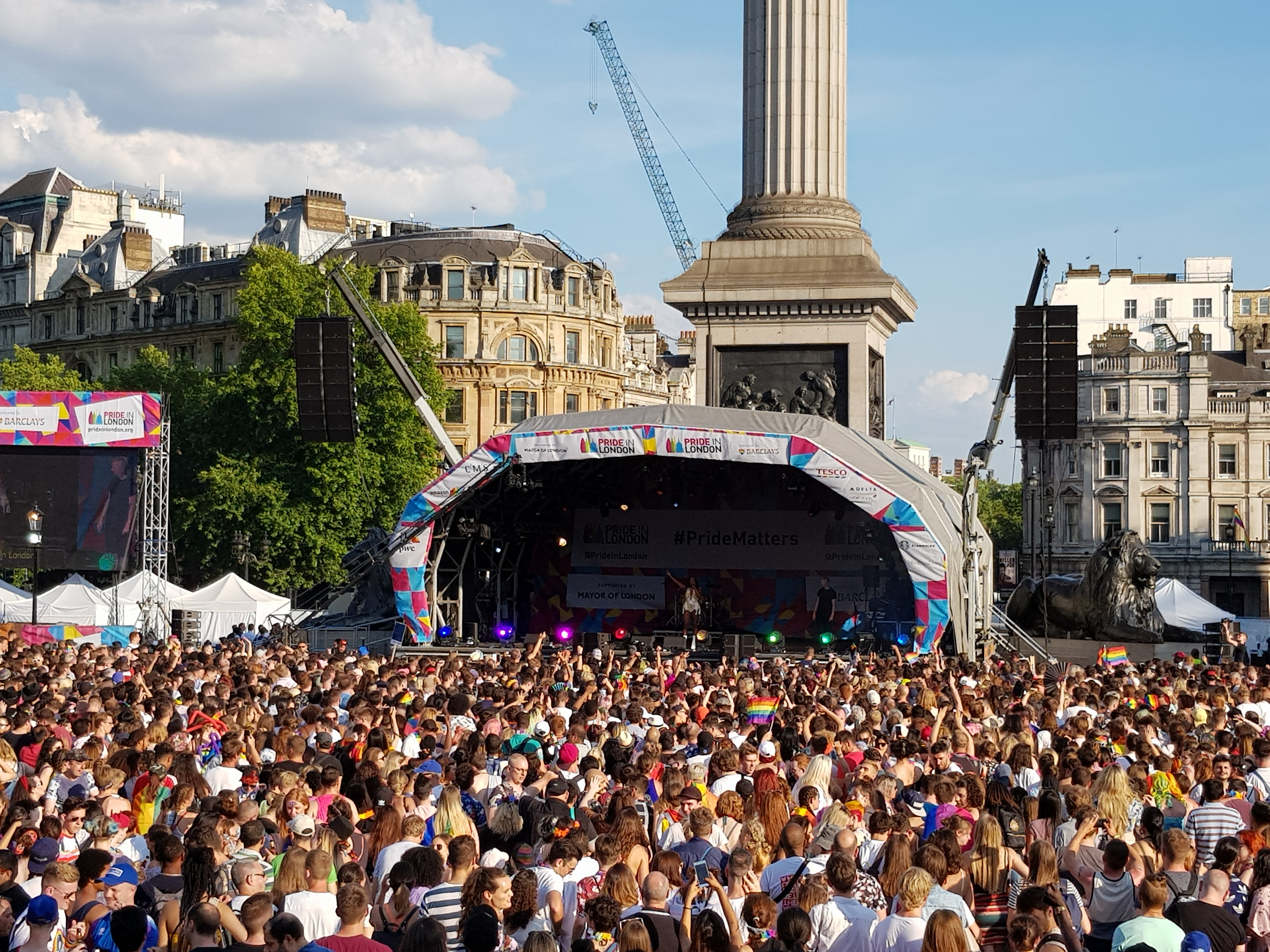
Trafalgar Square stage in 2018

In 2013, the parade ran from Baker Street to Whitehall via Trafalgar Square. Around 150 groups marched within the parade. In 2016, the parade route changed, starting from Portland Place and then heading down through Regent Street, Oxford Circus, Waterloo Place, Trafalgar Square and then dispersing in Whitehall. For the 2025 and 2026 route, it started at Hyde Park Corner, then going down the entire Piccadilly towards Piccadilly Circus, Haymarket, Trafalgar Square and down Whitehall as far as the Old Admiralty Buildings.

== Volunteers ==
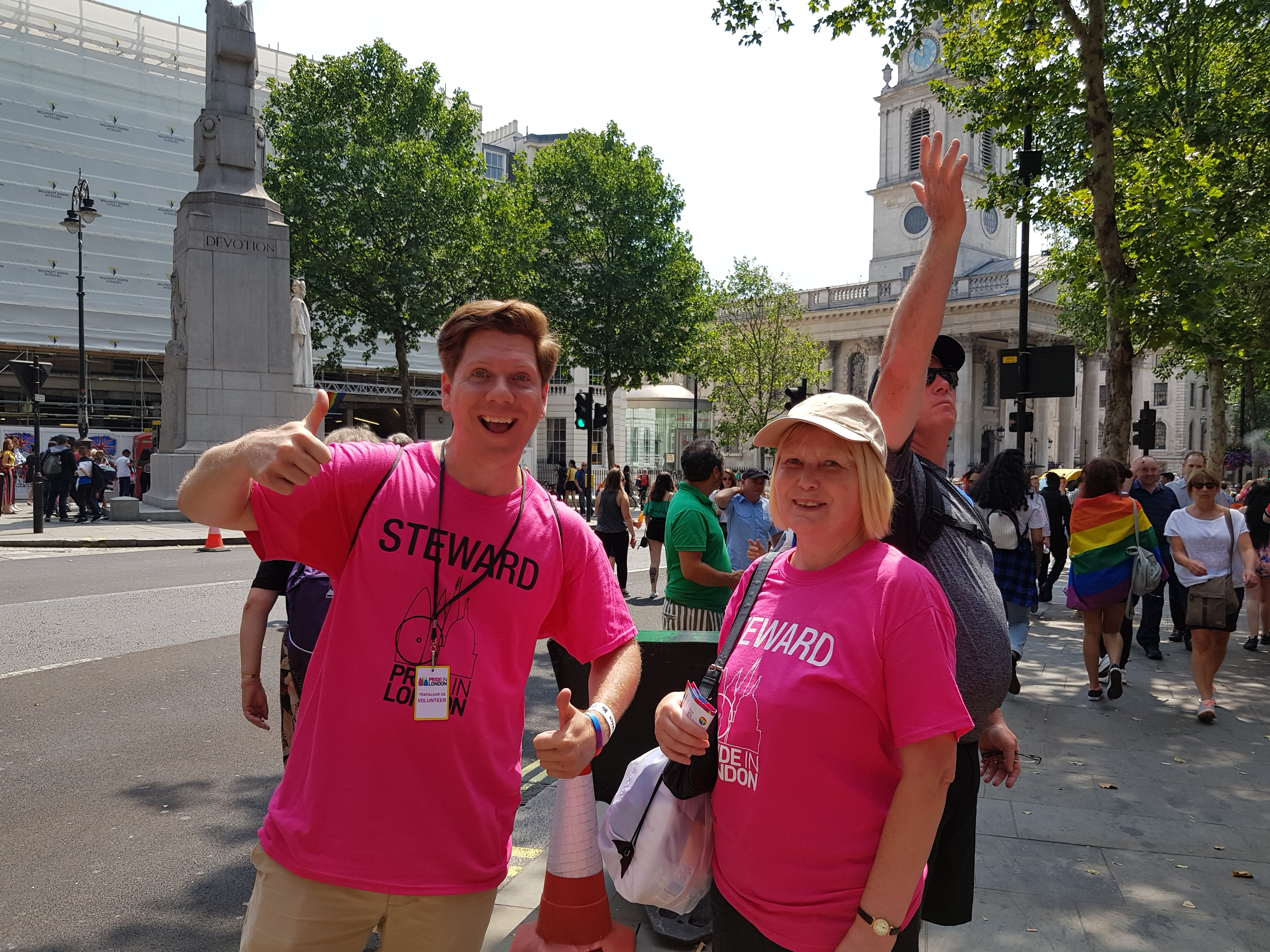
Stewards in 2018

Pride also has over 200 core volunteers who work throughout the year on organising Pride and recruiting additional volunteers to help steward the Pride day event. In 2019 Pride in London recruited over 1,000 volunteers to work at the event. This was the largest volunteer team Pride has ever had.

== Parade themes ==
Recent parade themes
Year	Date	Title	Theme description
2013		Love (and Marriage)	To coincide with MPs considering the Equal Marriage Bill.
2014		#FreedomTo	Occurring in the months following the implementation of the Marriage (Same Sex Couples), the theme was designed to be open to interpretation and inclusive of many possibilities, from "freedom to marry" to "freedom to be out on the pitch for gay footballers".
2015	27 June	#PrideHeroes	Occurring the day after the legalisation of same sex marriage in the US, the theme was used to celebrate LGBTQ figures of the day and throughout history including computer scientist Alan Turing and a gay sports club The King's Cross Steelers.
2016	25 June	#NoFilter	
2017	8 July	#LoveHappensHere	Following the London Bridge terror attacks, the parade was launched by members of the emergency services, and part of the campaign drew attention to stories of anti-LGBTQ hate crimes. The other aspect of the campaign focused on positive LGBTQ relationships and stories within the London.
2018		#PrideMatters	Following on from a piece of research Pride in London did alongside YouGov with a nationwide consultation, the theme's intent was to show the hate crimes and daily discrimination the LGBTQ community continues to face and the continued need for a social movement in support of LGBTQ rights and equality.
2019	6 July	#PrideJubilee	
2022	2 July	#AllOurPride	
2023	1 July	Never March Alone	Championing transgender and non-binary allyship.
2024		We Are Everywhere	Celebrating LGBTQIA+ Londoners - their everyday acts of defiance, resilience and pride.
2025		Volunqueer	Queer volunteering
2026	4 July	An Alliance of Defiance	

== Attendance ==
Year	Participants	Groups	Attendees
2013		150	
2016		300+	
2017	26,000	300	
2018	30,000	500	1 million +
2019			~1.5 million
2020	Cancelled		
2021	Cancelled		
2022			1 million +
2023			~1.5 million
2024			~1.5 million
2025			~1.5 million
2026	35,000	~600	~1.5 million

== Sponsors ==
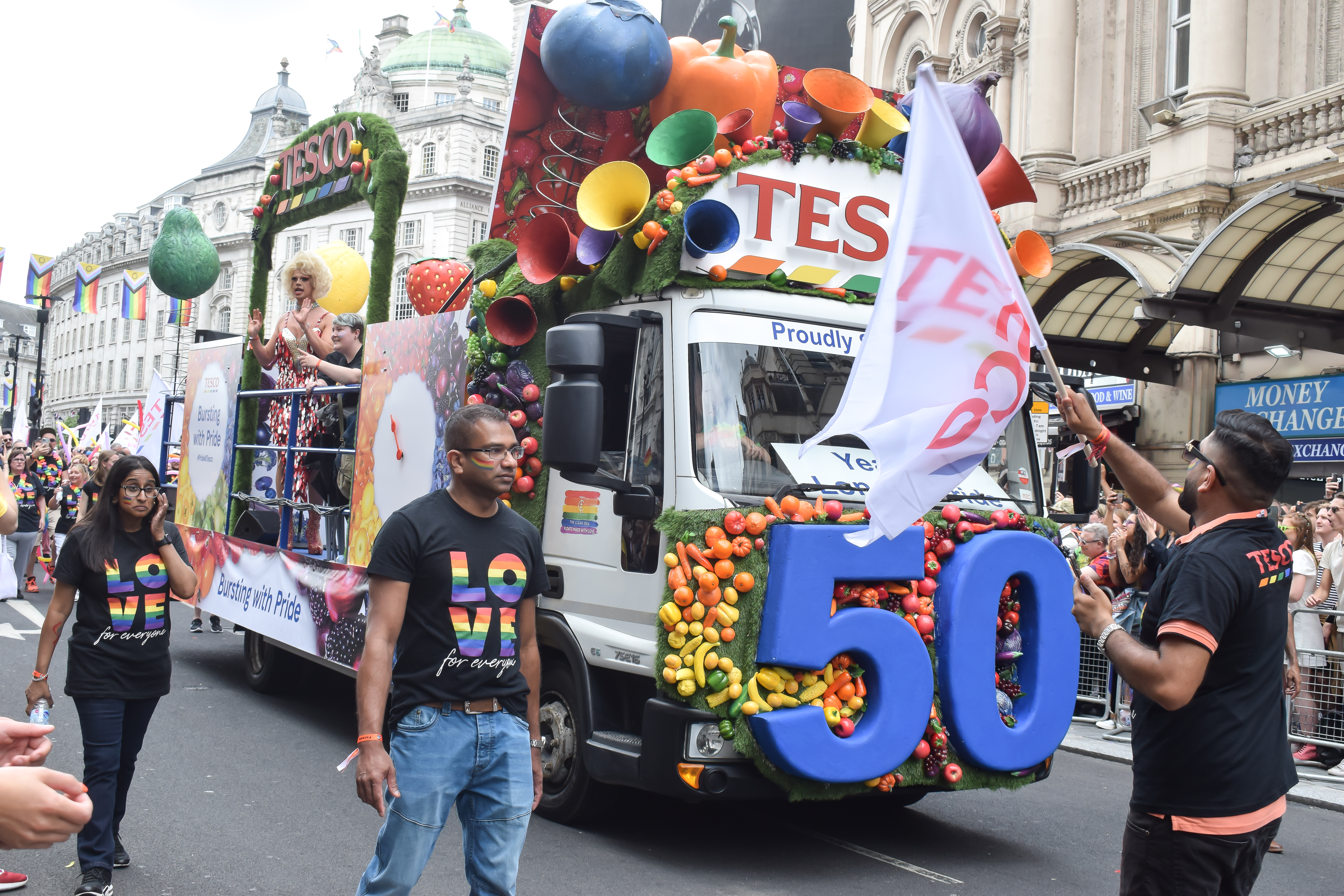
A Tesco float in 2022

Past sponsors for Pride in London have included were; Tesco, CMS, Barclays Bank, ASDA, CitiBank, Fuller's Brewery the brewer of London Pride (beer), Lidl, Durex, Prudential and SAB Miller. The event is also supported by Mayor of London. DIVA Magazine is a long-running sponsor of the Women's Stage in Leicester Square.

== Controversies ==
=== 2004-2012 – Corporate sponsorship ===
As Pride London (2004-2012), the charity came under criticism from socialists within the LGBTQ community due to it being a corporate-sponsored event. For instance, Hannah Dee argues that it had reached "the point that London Pride – once a militant demonstration in commemoration of the Stonewall riots – has become a corporate-sponsored event far removed from any challenge to the ongoing injustices that we [the LGBTQ community] face".

=== 2015 – UKIP ban ===
There was controversy over the decision taken by Pride in London to disallow the UK Independence Party (UKIP)'s entry into the 2015 parade. Pride in London said, "This decision has been made after careful consultation in order to protect participants and ensure the event passes off safely and in the right spirit, it has not been made on a political basis". Despite the ban, UKIP supporters joined the parade with a banner of "Some gays are UKIP, get over it!", a reference to the continuing Stonewall "Get Over It" campaign.

=== 2017 – Diversity and inclusion ===
Following the 2017 pride event, Pride in London's community advisory board released a report heavily criticising the organisation for, amongst other items, a lack of attention to the bisexual and transgender part of the community as well as a breakdown in communication with UK Black Pride. Pride in London responded to the report in a press release where they expressed concern over the report's accuracy and balance.

=== 2018 – Anti-transgender activism ===
In 2018, an anti-transgender organisation demanded to march behind the rainbow flag, which was condemned by Pride London but ultimately permitted, and eight anti-transgender activists carrying banners claiming "transactivism erases lesbians" took the lead of the demonstration. This was widely condemned by LGBTQ organisations and community. The organisers of Pride London were also criticised for not having taken measures to remove the trans-exclusionary activists from the march. The organisation was also criticised for its continued to retain Martina Navratilova as a patron who stated that the inclusion of transgender inclusion in sport is "insane and cheating".

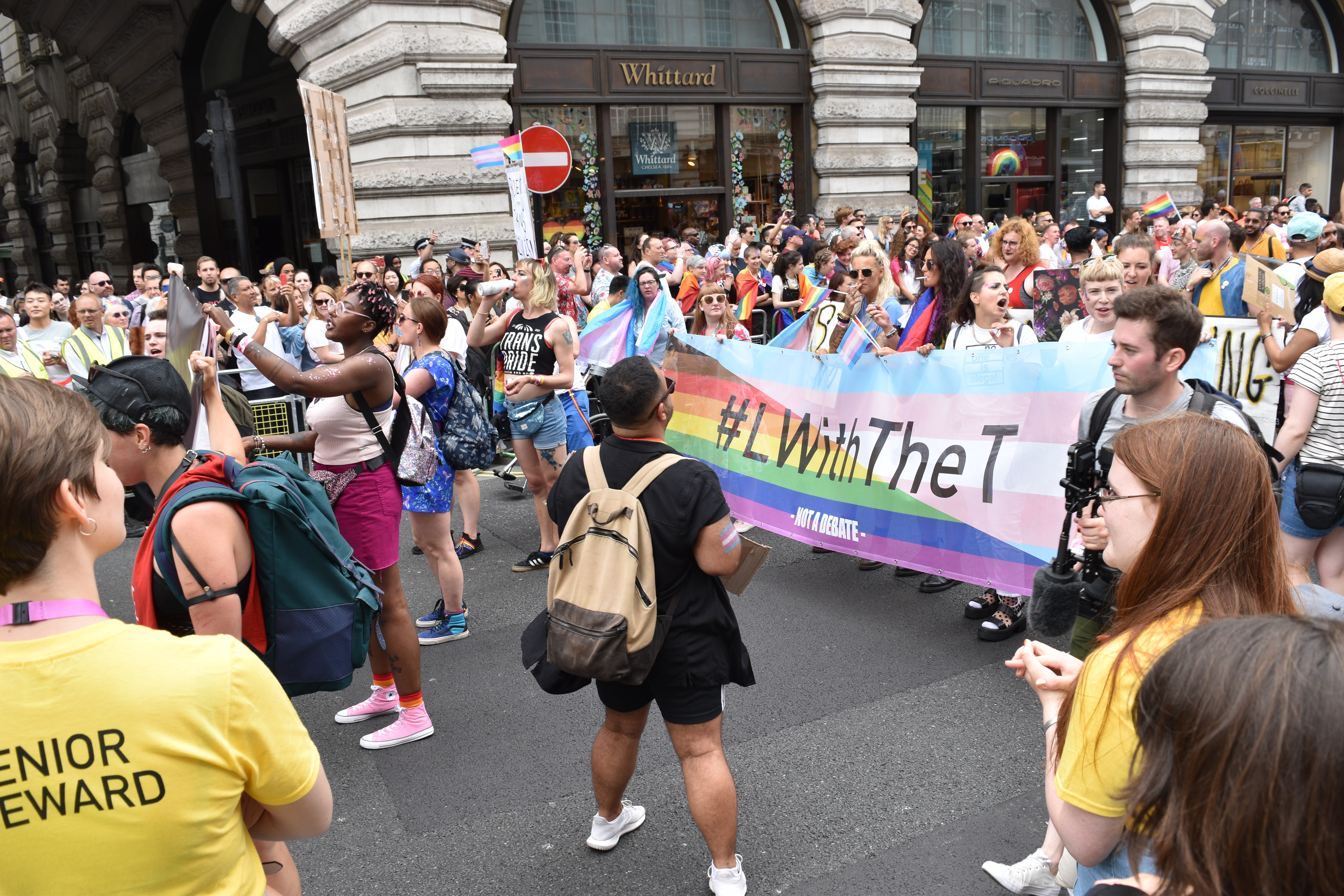
Lesbians in support of trans people, in 2019

Following on from the 2018 anti-transgender protest, the organisation enhanced their security for the 2019 event. London Trans+ Pride, a separate pride march advocating for transgender rights, was founded in 2019 in response to the events of Pride in London 2018.

=== 2021, 2025 – Leadership and bullying ===
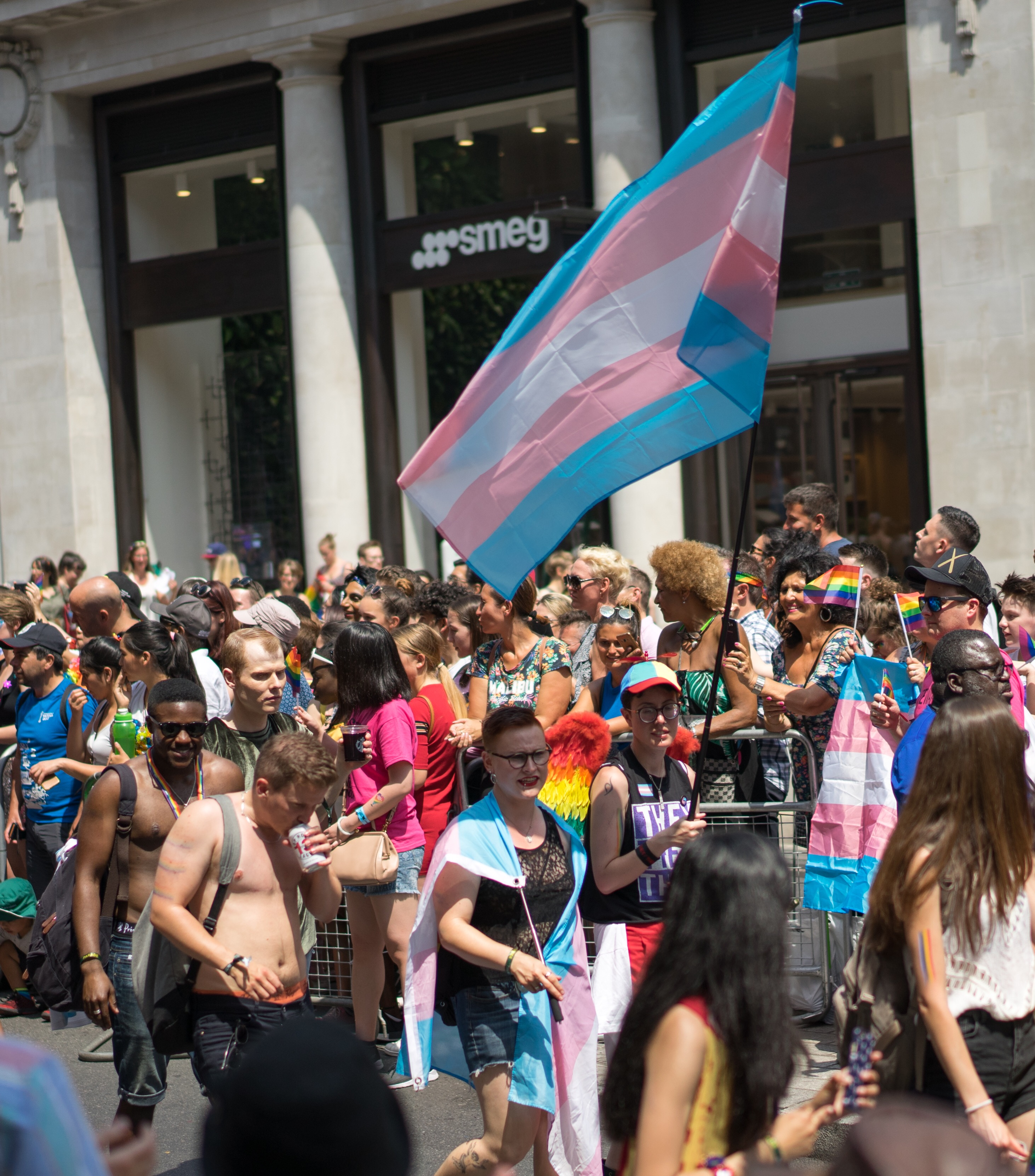
Transgender pride flags at the 2018 London pride parade.

During March 2021, one of the most senior volunteers, the Director of Communications, Rhammel Afflick, resigned in what they described as "distinct disregard for black and brown LGBT+ communities over a period of years". On 18 March 2021, the entire Pride in London Community Advisory Board (CAB) resigned, alleging both a culture of bullying and a hostile environment for people of colour. They cited "the increasing preoccupation at Pride in London with managing the public relations concerns of its leadership, at the cost of supporting its Black and POC volunteers or community members". Throughout 2021, sponsors withdrew from the event based on this controversy.

In October 2021, fourteen leading voices of the community wrote an open letter to the Mayor of London, who had previously called the organisation "a mess" and in need of a "reset and refresh how Pride in London is organised". The letter asked for intervention in the delivery of the event, including an investigation into bullying of volunteers, that directors make available a register of interests, and that the organisation engage with the community.

On 3 September 2025, The Guardian reported the organisation's CEO was being investigated for misappropriation or misuse of gifts or company funds, behaviour damaging or potentially damaging to the company's reputation, harassment or bullying of personnel and a “serious breach” of bullying, harassment and finance policies. On the same day, volunteers were informed by an internal email that a new Board of Directors and an Interim CEO had been appointed. Volunteers then received a contradictory internal email stating the CEO remained in post, and the newly appointed directors had been terminated from their roles the previous month, which was also shared via the organisation's social media.

The following month, The Guardian reported the former CEO was ordered by the High Court to hand over access to the organisation's bank account, social media and email accounts, which volunteers weren't able to access in the interim.

=== 2026 ===
On 2 April 2026, the boss of Pride in London was sacked after being accused of making personal purchases with thousands of pounds worth of vouchers intended for volunteers

== Awards and nominations ==
Year	Association	Category	Nominee(s)	Result
2017	Diversity in Media Awards	Marketing Campaign of the Year	Love Happens Here	Nominated

== See also ==
- Gay Liberation Front
- LGBTQ culture in London
- London LGBT+ Community Pride
