= Amelia Abraham =

British journalist and author (born 1991)

Amelia Abraham (born 1991) is a British journalist and author based in London. She is noted for her contributions to LGBTQ+ identity politics and has written extensively on related topics for numerous high-profile publications including The Guardian and Vogue. Abraham's work often intersects with feminist issues, human rights, health policy, arts and culture, and sexuality.

== Career ==
Abraham has written as a journalist at VICE, Refinery29, and Dazed. Her articles cover a broad range of topics, but she is particularly recognized for her focus on LGBTQ+ issues. She has also contributed to The Observer, The Sunday Times, ES Magazine, and I-D magazine.

== Publications ==
=== Queer Intentions: A (Personal) Journey Through LGBTQ+ Culture ===
In 2019, Abraham published her first book, Queer Intentions: A (Personal) Journey Through LGBTQ+ Culture. This book combines elements of memoir and investigative journalism, exploring the mainstreaming of queer culture. Abraham travels to various significant events and locations such as Britain's first same-sex wedding, RuPaul's DragCon in LA, and Pride parades across Europe. She also addresses serious issues such as the violence experienced by trans people in New York City. The book was shortlisted for the Polari First Book Prize in 2020.

=== We Can Do Better Than This ===
Abraham's second book, We Can Do Better Than This, is an anthology that compiles essays from queer pop stars, performers, academics, and activists. The contributors address the question: "If you could change something to make life better for LGBTQ+ people, what would it be?" The book aims to provide a comprehensive guide to modern queer activism and the aspirations of the LGBTQ+ community.

== Public Speaking and Advocacy ==
Apart from her writing, Abraham is an active public speaker and event curator, focusing on LGBTQ+ rights and queer culture. In 2018, she delivered a TEDx Talk titled "Why Feminists Should Support Transgender Rights".
