= London LGBT+ Community Pride =

English LGBTQ company

London LGBT+ Community Pride (Pride in London)
- Formation: 6 December 2012; 13 years ago
- Type: Community Interest Company
- Purpose: LGBTQ rights
- Headquarters: London
- Region served: United Kingdom
- Chairs: Michael Salter-Church & Alison Camps
- Website: prideinlondon.org

London LGBT+ Community Pride is a Community Interest Company that was formed at the end of 2012 to bid for the right to run London's main gay pride festival in the wake of the significantly "scaled back" WorldPride London 2012 event and was awarded the contract on 18 January 2013 by the Mayor of London.

The company's mission is to:

- Be fully inclusive of all sections of the LGBTQ community, free at the point of access
- Provide a celebration of LGBTQ life and a platform to continue the fight for equality and to challenge prejudice
- Grow over time in a sustainable way which is led by the LGBTQ community

== History ==
A London-based gay pride event has been organized by several organisations since the first official UK Gay Pride Rally which was held in London on 1 July 1972 (chosen as the nearest Saturday to the anniversary of the Stonewall riots of 1969) with approximately 2000 participants. The first London gay marches were in November 1970 with 150 men walking through Highbury Fields in North London. The controversy of Section 28 from 1988 lead to numbers increasing on the march in protest. In 1983 the march was renamed "Lesbian and Gay Pride" and in the 1990s became more of a carnival event. London was selected to hold the first Europride in 1992 and hosted it again in 2006.

In 2012, the previous organisers Pride London were forced to significantly "scale back" the WorldPride London 2012 event nine days before the event was due to take place. The London Evening Standard reported that four contractors from the previous year's Pride event were owed £65,000 in unpaid debts, though this has been officially denied by organisers. Subsequently, a bidding process for non-profit community-based organisations to submit bids to run and develop Pride in London was announced by the Mayor of London. The winning bidder, London LGBT+ Community Pride, was awarded the right to run London's main gay pride festival for five years on 18 January 2013.
