= Malta in the Eurovision Song Contest 2024 =

- Eurovision Song Contest 2024
- Participating broadcaster: Public Broadcasting Services (PBS)
- Country: Malta
- Selection process: Malta Eurovision Song Contest 2024
- Selection date: 3 February 2024

Competing entry
- Song: "Loop"
- Artist: Sarah Bonnici
- Songwriters: John Emil Johansson; Joy Deb; Kevin Lee; Leire Gotxi Angel; Linnea Deb; Matthew James Borg; Michael Joe Cini; Sarah Bonnici; Sebastian Pritchard-James

Placement
- Semi-final result: Failed to qualify (16th)

Participation chronology

Malta was represented at the Eurovision Song Contest 2024 with the song "Loop" performed by Sarah Bonnici. The Maltese participating broadcaster, Public Broadcasting Services (PBS), selected its entry for the contest through the national final Malta Eurovision Song Contest 2024.

== Background ==
Prior to the 2024 contest, the Maltese Broadcasting Authority (MBA) until 1975, and the Public Broadcasting Services (PBS) since 1991, had participated in the Eurovision Song Contest representing Malta thirty-five times since MBA's first entry in 1971. MBA briefly competed in the contest in the 1970s before withdrawing. PBS had competed in every contest since 1991. Their best placing in the contest thus far was second, which it achieved on two occasions: in 2002 with the song "7th Wonder" performed by Ira Losco and in the 2005 with the song "Angel" performed by Chiara. Both in 2022 and 2023, it failed to qualify for the final with the songs "I Am What I Am" performed by Emma Muscat and "Dance (Our Own Party)" performed by The Busker.

As part of its duties as participating broadcaster, PBS organises the selection of its entry in the Eurovision Song Contest and broadcasts the event in the country. For the third year in a row, the broadcaster opted to select its entry through the national selection show Malta Eurovision Song Contest, a format previously held between 2012 and 2018.

== Before Eurovision ==
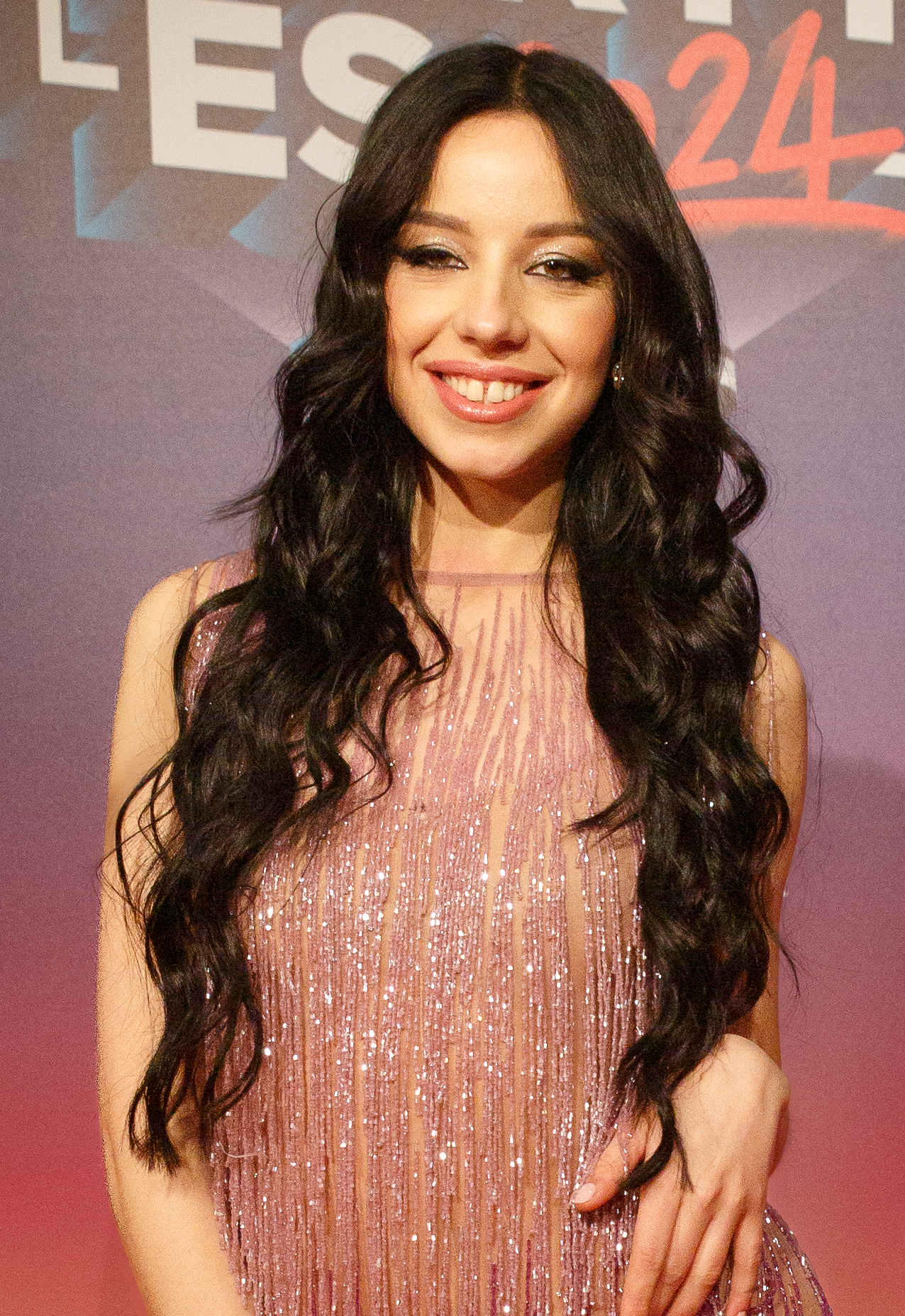
Sarah Bonnici, winner of Malta Eurovision Song Contest 2024, at the PrePartyES event in Madrid

=== Malta Eurovision Song Contest 2024 ===
Malta Eurovision Song Contest 2024 was the national final format developed by PBS to select the Maltese entry for the Eurovision Song Contest 2024. The competition consisted of a semi-final phase and final, and was held between October 2023 and February 2024. Both phases were broadcast on Television Malta (TVM) as well as on the broadcaster's streaming platform tvmi.mt.

==== Format ====
The competition was divided into a semi-final and a final. The semi-final phase consisted of nine performances in each of the four weekly episodes of the TV show XOW between 27 October and 17 November 2023, where a combination of votes from a jury and a public televote determined a total of twelve qualifiers for the final. This consisted of a show week featuring pre-recorded performances and ad-hoc music videos created by the contestants, with the winner being decreed by a similar combination of votes from the jury and the public. The final was originally planned as a one-night show to be held in January 2024; on 9 January, however, PBS clarified the mechanics of the final stage: three episodes aired between 29 and 31 January, where the finalists were interviewed; the music videos for their songs premiered on 1 February; a "nostalgia night" was held on 2 February, where contestants performed Maltese or international songs from the past; and the final was held on 3 February.

The seven members of the jury that evaluated the entries during the semi-final and final consisted of:

- Matthew Bugeja - Conductor and orchestrator
- Ray Calleja - Actor and theatre & television director
- Mary-Ann Cauchi - Director Funding and Strategy at Arts Council Malta
- Maria Ellul
- Oriana Farrugia - Architect and civil engineer
- Albert Marshall - Author, Executive Chairman of the Arts Council Malta and theatre & television director
- Clayton Mercieca

==== Competing entries ====
On 15 April 2023, PBS announced the songwriting camp MESC Music Exchange Camp would be held between 12 and 15 June, dedicated to the creation of 18 competing songs for their next national selection.

On 21 August 2023, PBS published the regulations of Malta Eurovision Song Contest 2024, announcing that artists and composers would be able to submit their entries between 28 August and 20 September 2023. Songwriters from any nationality were able to submit songs as long as the artist was Maltese or possessed Maltese citizenship. Artists were able to submit as many songs as they wish, however, they could only compete with one in the semi-final. A dedicated panel selected the semi-finalist entries, which were announced on 18 October 2023. It was later revealed that ten of them, without specifying which, had been selected from the MESC Music Exchange Camp.

Among the selected competing artists were Moira Stafrace of Chris & Moira, who represented Malta in the 1994 contest, and Eliana Gomez Blanco, who represented Malta in the Junior Eurovision Song Contest 2019.

Artist	Song	Songwriter(s)
Christian Arding	"Bellus"	Emil Calleja Bayliss; Gilbert Camilleri
Cosette Baldacchino	"Free Fall"	Lauren White Murphy; Natasha Turner; Niall Mooney
Dan	"Baraxx"	Cyprian Cassar; Daniel Muscat Caruana
Denise Mercieca	"Mara"	Denise Mercieca; Georgia Meek; Matteo Depares
Desirei Grech	"Watch Me"	Unknown
Dominic Cini	"Bewsa"	Dominic Cini; Etienne Micallef
Eliana Gomez Blanco	"There's Only Flowers"	Eliana Gomez Blanco; Leire Gotxi Angel; Sebastian Pritchard-James
Erba'	"Sirena"	Alexander Olsson; Audun Agnar Guldbrandsen; Erba'; Maria Cachia Abdilla; Tom Hugo Hermansen
Franklin Calleja	"Puppet"	Franklin Calleja; Matheus Augusto da Silva; Michael Joe Cini
Gail Attard	"Wild Card"	Christina Magrin
Greta Tude	"Topic (Bla Bla)"	Antoine Farrugia; Cyprian Cassar; Matthew Mercieca; Patrik Jean
Haley Azzopardi	"Tell Me That It's Over"	Haley Azzopardi; Leire Gotxi Angel; Matthew James Borg; Sebastian Pritchard-James
Janvil	"Man"	Edward Abela; Ian Vella
Jessica Micallef	"Tagħna Tnejn"	Jessica Micallef
Karin Duff	"Breaking Bad"	Andreas Stone Johansson; Gerard James Borg; Karin Duff
Kurt Calleja (Note: Not to be confused with the Kurt Calleja who represented Malta in the Eurovision Song Contest 2012.)	"Misunderstood"	Aidan O'Connor; Richard Micallef
Kyle George	"Arrows"	Andreas Lindbergh; Gerard James Borg; Kyle George; Sebastian Pritchard-James
Lisa Gauci	"Breathe"	Cyprian Cassar; Emil Calleja Bayliss; Patrik Jean; Petra Zammit
Lyndsay Pace	"Fire Proof"	Linda Persson; Peter Frödin; Rodrigo Pinto; Ylva Persson
Maria Christina	"Moving On"	Emil Calleja Bayliss; Janne Hyöty; Linda Persson; Ylva Persson
Marie Claire	"Fading"	John-Emil Johansson; Marie Claire; Matheus Augusto da Silva; Toby Farrugia
Mark Anthony Bartolo	"Condition or Fiction"	Mark Anthony Bartolo
Mark Portelli	"Just Be"	Kimberley Cortis
Martina Cutajar	"Miles Away"	Luca Napolitano; Martina Cutajar
Matt Blxck	"Banana"	Douglas Carr; Maria Broberg; Matthew Caruana; Oliver Fernström; Sean Banan
Michela Galea	"Let's Talk About Love"	Andreas Stone Johansson; Michela Galea; Emil Calleja Bayliss; Sebastian Pritchard-James
Miguel Bonello	"Better Off Alone"	Leire Gotxi Angel; Matthew Mercieca; Michael Joe Cini; Miguel Bonello
Miriana Conte	"Venom"	Daniel Borg; Matthew Mercieca; Miriana Conte
Moira Stafrace	"Feather Flight"	David Cassar Torreggiani; Moira Stafrace; Toby Farrugia
Nathan	"Ghost"	Alexander Olsson; Cyprian Cassar; Nathan Psaila; Tom Hugo Hermansen
Oxygyn	"Cloudmaker"	Janelle Borg; Kurt Abela; Luke Camilleri; Zack Camilleri
Ryan Hili	"Karma"	Andreas Lindbergh; Joy Deb; Linnea Deb
Sarah Bonnici	"Loop"	Kevin Lee; Leire Gotxi Angel; Michael Joe Cini; Sarah Bonnici; Sebastian Pritchard-James
Sopranique	"Empire"	Gerard James Borg; Mark Masri; Patrick Hamilton
Stefan Galea	"Numb"	Matthew James Borg; Matthew Mercieca; Michael Joe Cini; Stefan Galea
Thea Aquilina	"Blood Stream"	Gerard James Borg; Leire Gotxi Angel; Thea Aquilina; Toby Farrugia

==== Shows ====
===== Semi-final =====
The semi-final took place over four episodes of XOW – hosted by Ron Briffa and Jacqui Losco – on 27 October, 3 November, 10 November and 17 November 2023, with nine acts performing in each show. The voting was open after each show and for a fifth overall round on 24 November, at the end of which the results were announced.

Semi-final show 1 – 27 October 2023
R/O	Artist	Song	Result
1	Kurt Calleja	"Misunderstood"	Eliminated
2	Sarah Bonnici	"Loop"	Advanced
3	Gail Attard	"Wild Card"	Advanced
4	Mark Anthony Bartolo	"Condition or Fiction"	Eliminated
5	Eliana Gomez Blanco	"There's Only Flowers"	Eliminated
6	Oxygyn	"Cloudmaker"	Eliminated
7	Nathan	"Ghost"	Advanced
8	Lyndsay Pace	"Fire Proof"	Eliminated
9	Dominic Cini	"Bewsa"	Eliminated

Semi-final show 2 – 3 November 2023
R/O	Artist	Song	Result
1	Marie Claire	"Fading"	Eliminated
2	Franklin Calleja	"Puppet"	Eliminated
3	Desirei Grech	"Watch Me"	Eliminated
4	Sopranique	"Empire"	Eliminated
5	Janvil	"Man"	Advanced
6	Haley Azzopardi	"Tell Me That It's Over"	Advanced
7	Denise Mercieca	"Mara"	Advanced
8	Mark Portelli	"Just Be"	Eliminated
9	Maria Christina	"Moving On"	Eliminated

Semi-final show 3 – 10 November 2023
R/O	Artist	Song	Result
1	Jessica Micallef	"Tagħna Tnejn"	Eliminated
2	Cosette Baldacchino	"Free Fall"	Eliminated
3	Michela Galea	"Let's Talk About Love"	Eliminated
4	Thea Aquilina	"Blood Stream"	Eliminated
5	Miguel Bonello	"Better Off Alone"	Eliminated
6	Moira Stafrace	"Feather Flight"	Eliminated
7	Dan	"Baraxx"	Eliminated
8	Stefan Galea	"Numb"	Eliminated
9	Karin Duff	"Breaking Bad"	Eliminated

Semi-final show 4 – 17 November 2023
R/O	Artist	Song	Result
1	Erba'	"Sirena"	Advanced
2	Miriana Conte	"Venom"	Advanced
3	Christian Arding	"Bellus"	Eliminated
4	Lisa Gauci	"Breathe"	Advanced
5	Matt Blxck	"Banana"	Advanced
6	Martina Cutajar	"Miles Away"	Eliminated
7	Greta Tude	"Topic (Bla Bla)"	Advanced
8	Ryan Hili	"Karma"	Advanced
9	Kyle George	"Arrows"	Eliminated

===== Final =====
The final took place on 3 February 2024 and was hosted by Carlo Borg Bonaci and Angie Laus. Voting was opened on 2 February, after the release of the music videos, and lasted until the final. Yulan Law and The Busker performed as interval acts. The winner was determined by a weighed combination of votes from a seven-member jury panel (7/9) and a public televote (2/9).

Final – 3 February 2024
R/O	Artist	Song	Jury	Televote	Total	Place
1	Janvil	"Man"	24	5	29	8
2	Haley	"Tell Me That It's Over"	5	2	7	12
3	Erba'	"Sirena"	47	9	56	4
4	Nathan	"Ghost"	15	8	23	10
5	Lisa Gauci	"Breathe"	36	3	39	5
6	Sarah Bonnici	"Loop"	79	23	102	1
7	Greta Tude	"Topic (Bla Bla)"	25	7	32	7
8	Miriana Conte	"Venom"	23	2	25	9
9	Ryan Hili	"Karma"	54	17	71	3
10	Gail	"Wild Card"	17	3	20	11
11	Denise	"Mara"	30	9	39	5
12	Matt Blxck	"Banana"	51	29	80	2

Detailed jury votes
R/O	Song	Juror							Total
R/O	Song	1	2	3	4	5	6	7	Total
1	"Man"	8	1	4		5	4	2	24
2	"Tell Me That It's Over"							5	5
3	"Sirena"	4	8	12	10	4	8	1	47
4	"Ghost"		2	2	3		2	6	15
5	"Breathe"	7	5	8	1	3	5	7	36
6	"Loop"	12	12	7	12	12	12	12	79
7	"Topic (Bla Bla)"	3	3	5	8	6			25
8	"Venom"	6	4		6	2	1	4	23
9	"Karma"	5	7	10	4	10	10	8	54
10	"Wild Card"	2		6	2	1	3	3	17
11	"Mara"	1	6	1	7	8	7		30
12	"Banana"	10	10	3	5	7	6	10	51

=== Preparation and promotion ===
Ahead of the contest, "Loop" was revamped in February 2024 in collaboration with Swedish songwriters and producers Joy and Linnea Deb; the new version, recorded in Stockholm, was released on 14 March.

As part of the promotion of her participation in the contest, Sarah Bonnici attended the PrePartyES in Madrid on 30 March 2024, the London Eurovision Party on 7 April 2024, the Eurovision in Concert event in Amsterdam on 13 April 2024 and the Copenhagen Eurovision Party (Malmöhagen) on 4 May 2024. She will also perform at the Eurovision Village in Malmö on 7 May 2024. She additionally launched a social media challenge on TikTok and Instagram between 17 March and 16 April 2024, with the creator of the best video performance for "Loop" being selected to win two tickets for semi-final 2 – where Bonnici is set to compete.

== At Eurovision ==
The Eurovision Song Contest 2024 took place at the Malmö Arena in Malmö, Sweden, and consisted of two semi-finals held on the respective dates of 7 and 9 May and the final on 11 May 2024. All nations with the exceptions of the host country and the "Big Five" (France, Germany, Italy, Spain and the United Kingdom) are required to qualify from one of two semi-finals in order to compete in the final; the top ten countries from each semi-final progress to the final. On 30 January 2024, an allocation draw was held to determine which of the two semi-finals, as well as which half of the show, each country would perform in; the European Broadcasting Union (EBU) split up the competing countries into different pots based on voting patterns from previous contests, with countries with favourable voting histories put into the same pot. Malta was scheduled for the first half of the second semi-final. The shows' producers then decided the running order for the semi-finals; Malta was set to open the show.

In Malta, all three shows of the contest are being broadcast on TVM.

=== Performance ===
Sarah Bonnici took part in technical rehearsals on 29 April and 2 May, followed by dress rehearsals on 8 and 9 May. For her performance of "Loop" at the contest, she was accompanied by four supporting dancers.

=== Semi-final ===
Malta opened the semi-final, before the entry from Albania. The country was not announced among the top 10 entries in the semi-final and therefore failed to qualify to compete in the final.

=== Voting ===
Below is a breakdown of points awarded to and by Malta in the second semi-final and in the final. Voting during the three shows involved each country awarding sets of points from 1-8, 10 and 12: one from their professional jury and the other from televoting in the final vote, while the semi-final vote was based entirely on the vote of the public. The Maltese jury consisted of Paul Anthony Abela, Gail Attard, Haley Azzopardi, Cipryan Cassar, and Matthew Mercieca. In the second semi-final, Malta placed 16th and last with 13 points. Over the course of the contest, Malta awarded its 12 points to the Netherlands in the second semi-final, and to Switzerland (jury) and Ukraine (televote) in the final.

PBS appointed Matt Blxck as its spokesperson to announce the Maltese jury's votes in the final.

==== Points awarded to Malta ====
Points awarded to Malta (Semi-final 2)
Score	Televote
12 points	
10 points	
8 points	
7 points	
6 points	
5 points	Armenia
4 points	San Marino (Note: San Marino uses a jury in the semi-finals.)
3 points	Greece
2 points	
1 point	France

==== Points awarded by Malta ====
Points awarded by Malta (Semi-final 2)
Score	Televote
12 points	Netherlands
10 points	Israel
8 points	Switzerland
7 points	Latvia
6 points	Greece
5 points	Armenia
4 points	Georgia
3 points	Austria
2 points	Czechia
1 point	Denmark

Points awarded by Malta (Final)
Score	Televote	Jury
12 points	Ukraine	Switzerland
10 points	Croatia	Croatia
8 points	Italy	Italy
7 points	France	Ireland
6 points	Switzerland	France
5 points	Israel	Latvia
4 points	Ireland	Luxembourg
3 points	Serbia	Israel
2 points	Greece	Georgia
1 point	Sweden	Portugal

==== Detailed voting results ====
Each participating broadcaster assembles a five-member jury panel consisting of music industry professionals who are citizens of the country they represent. Each jury, and individual jury member, is required to meet a strict set of criteria regarding professional background, as well as diversity in gender and age. No member of a national jury was permitted to be related in any way to any of the competing acts in such a way that they cannot vote impartially and independently. The individual rankings of each jury member as well as the nation's televoting results were released shortly after the grand final.

The following members comprised the Maltese jury:

- Paul Anthony Abela
- Gail Attard
- Haley Azzopardi
- Cyprian Cassar
- Matthew Mercieca

Detailed voting results from Malta (Semi-final 2)
R/O	Country	Televote	
R/O	Country	Rank	Points
01	Malta		
02	Albania	13	
03	Greece	5	6
04	Switzerland	3	8
05	Czechia	9	2
06	Austria	8	3
07	Denmark	10	1
08	Armenia	6	5
09	Latvia	4	7
10	San Marino	15	
11	Georgia	7	4
12	Belgium	12	
13	Estonia	14	
14	Israel	2	10
15	Norway	11	
16	Netherlands	1	12

Detailed voting results from Malta (Final)
R/O	Country	Jury							Televote	
R/O	Country	Juror A	Juror B	Juror C	Juror D	Juror E	Rank	Points	Rank	Points
01	Sweden	20	16	21	13	11	17		10	1
02	Ukraine	18	22	7	17	8	13		1	12
03	Germany	4	17	17	18	22	12		22	
04	Luxembourg	3	11	9	12	4	7	4	19	
~~05~~	~~Netherlands~~ ‡ (Note: The Netherlands was disqualified prior to the final.)	~~11~~	~~21~~	~~4~~	~~14~~	~~7~~	~~10~~		N/A	
06	Israel	5	5	16	8	26	8	3	6	5
07	Lithuania	19	18	23	15	15	22		12	
08	Spain	25	19	8	16	12	16		16	
09	Estonia	24	20	15	26	24	25		21	
10	Ireland	12	2	6	5	2	4	7	7	4
11	Latvia	6	26	1	6	14	6	5	11	
12	Greece	21	9	26	21	19	19		9	2
13	United Kingdom	22	12	25	19	13	21		17	
14	Norway	13	25	10	22	20	18		23	
15	Italy	2	4	20	2	6	3	8	3	8
16	Serbia	23	15	11	23	18	20		8	3
17	Finland	14	24	14	24	25	24		18	
18	Portugal	9	7	18	9	16	11	1	24	
19	Armenia	10	10	19	10	17	14		15	
20	Cyprus	17	13	24	20	23	23		20	
21	Switzerland	1	1	2	1	1	1	12	5	6
22	Slovenia	26	23	22	25	21	26		25	
23	Croatia	7	6	3	4	3	2	10	2	10
24	Georgia	8	8	12	7	9	9	2	13	
25	France	16	3	5	3	5	5	6	4	7
26	Austria	15	14	13	11	10	15		14	
