= Loop (Sarah Bonnici song) =

2024 song by Sarah Bonnici

Single by Sarah Bonnici
- Released: 14 March 2024
- Genre: Dance-pop
- Length: 2:59
- Label: Independent
- Songwriter(s): John Emil Johansson; Kevin Lee; Sebastian Pritchard-James; Leire Gotxi Angel; Matthew James Borg; Michael Joe Cini; Joy Deb; Linnea Deb; Sarah Bonnici; Ale Zabala

Sarah Bonnici singles chronology
"Never Ever" (2023)	"Loop" (2024)	"Hold Me Closer" (2024)

Music video
- "Loop" on YouTube

Original music video
- "Loop" on YouTube

Eurovision Song Contest 2024 entry
- Country: Malta
- Artist(s): Sarah Bonnici
- Language: English
- Composer(s): John Emil Johansson; Kevin Lee; Joy Deb; Leire Gotxi Angel; Linnea Deb; Matthew James Borg; Michael Joe Cini; Sarah Bonnici; Sebastian Pritchard-James
- Lyricist(s): Kevin Lee; Joy Deb; Leire Gotxi Angel; Linnea Deb; Michael Joe Cini; Sarah Bonnici; Sebastian Pritchard-James; Ale Zabala

Finals performance
- Semi-final result: 16th
- Semi-final points: 13

Entry chronology
- ◄ "Dance (Our Own Party)" (2023)
- "Serving" (2025) ►

Official performance video
- "Loop" (Second Semi-Final) on YouTube

"Loop" is a song by Maltese singer Sarah Bonnici. Self-described as a positive love song, it was written by Bonnici alongside seven other songwriters. It was officially self-released on 14 March 2024, and represented Malta in the Eurovision Song Contest 2024 in Malmö. It did not qualify for the Eurovision final, finishing 16th and last place with 13 points during semi final 2.

== Background and composition ==
"Loop" was written by Sarah Bonnici alongside Sebastian Pritchard-James, John-Emil Johannson, Kevin Lee, Leire Gotxi Angel and Michael Joe Cini. The official revamped version also credited Joy Deb, Linnea Deb, John Emil Johansson and Matthew James Borg. In interviews with ESC Bubble's Ervin Juhász, Bonnici stated that the song was written solely to enter the contest. Bonnici later stated in another interview that the song was a "[positive] love song" about a person that was romantically interested in her. After an initial stage of teasing, Bonnici and her partner ended up in a happy "loop".

The song was announced as a participating entry in the Malta Eurovision Song Contest 2024 on 18 October 2023. It was first premiered during the first semi final on 27 October, which took place on the Maltese evening show XOW. A music video was filmed and premiered as part of the Malta Eurovision Song Contest on 1 February 2024. The official release of "Loop" took place on 14 March 2024, which featured a new version of the song and a music video which premiered on the official Eurovision Song Contest YouTube channel. The video featured newly-shot footage as well as parts of the previously-filmed music video.

== Music video and promotion ==
Along with the song's official release, an accompanying music video was released on the same day. An original music video was also released before its official release on 1 February. To further promote the song, Bonnici announced her intents to participate in various Eurovision pre-parties throughout the month of March and April, including Pre-Party ES 2024 on 30 March, the London Eurovision Party 2024 on the 7th, and Eurovision in Concert 2024 on the 13th.

== Eurovision Song Contest ==
=== Malta Eurovision Song Contest 2024 ===
Malta's public broadcaster PBS organised a two-stage, 36 entry contest to select its entrant for the Eurovision Song Contest 2024. The competition consisted of four semi-finals with nine entries each, of which 12 would qualify to the final. The semi-finals took place on October 27, November 3, November 10 and November 17, with qualifiers announced on November 24 on the evening show XOW, while the final took place on 3 February 2024 following a six-day special. Televoting was available in the semi-finals, however, the exact system or scores were not revealed. In the final, the winner was determined by a jury vote and a televote, with a 7:2 ratio favouring the juries.

Sarah Bonnici was announced as a participant on 18 October 2023. The song was drawn to perform second in the first semi final, and was announced to have qualified on 24 November. In the final, Bonnici performed in sixth and won the competition with 102 points. She placed first in the jury vote and second in the televote.

=== At Eurovision ===
The Eurovision Song Contest 2024 took place at the Malmö Arena in Malmö, Sweden, and consisted of two semi-finals held on the respective dates of 7 and 9 May and the final on 11 May 2024. During the allocation draw on 30 January 2024, Malta was drawn to compete in the second semi-final, performing in the first half of the show. Bonnici was later drawn to open the semi-final, behind Albania's Besa.

The Eurovision performance featured Bonnici alongside four background dancers, with the singer wearing a silver suit adorned with sparkles.

== Track listing ==
Digital download/streaming

1. "Loop" – 2:59

Digital download/streaming – Acoustic version

1. "Loop (Acoustic Version)" – 2:40

== Charts ==
=== Weekly charts ===
Weekly chart performance for "Loop"
Chart (2024)	Peak position
Malta Domestic Airplay (BMAT PRS)	1

=== Year-end charts ===
Year-end chart performance for "Loop"
Chart (2024)	Peak position
Malta Domestic Airplay (BMAT PRS)	10

== Release history ==
Release history and formats for "Loop"
Country	Date	Format(s)	Version	Label	Ref.
Various	14 March 2024	Digital download; streaming	Single	Self-released	
Various	7 May 2024	Digital download; streaming	Acoustic version	Self-released	

== See also ==
- List of number-one singles of the 2020s (Malta)
