= Ira Losco discography =

- Studio albums: 8
- Compilation albums: 2
- Singles: 56

The discography of Ira Losco, a Maltese singer, contains five studio albums and forty-three singles. She represented Malta at the Eurovision Song Contest 2002 in Tallinn, Estonia with the song "7th Wonder", the song went on to finish second in the Final which was won by Marie N from Latvia with the song "I Wanna". She represented her country for the second time at Eurovision Song Contest 2016 in Stockholm, Sweden with the song "Walk on Water" and finished 11th (Ties with The Netherlands) in the grand final.

Her debut studio album, Someone Else, was released in April 2004. The album includes the singles "Love Me Or Hate Me", "Who I Am", "Someone Else", "Say Hey", "I'm In Love Again" and "Must've Been Good". Her first Remix album, Blends & Remixes of Someone Else, was released in January 2005. Her second studio album, Accident Prone, was released in November 2005. The album includes the singles "Everyday", "Get Out", "Don't Wanna Talk About It", "Driving One Of Your Cars", "Accident Prone", "Uh-Oh" and "Waking Up To The Light". Her third studio album, Unmasked, was released in December 2006. The album includes the singles "Winter Day" and "Arms Of The Ones...". Her fourth studio album, Fortune Teller, was released in June 2008. The album includes the singles "Something To Talk About", "Don't Look Down", "Idle Motion", "Promises", "Elvis Can You Hear Me?", "Shoulders of Giants", "What's The Matter With You?" and "Fortune Teller". Her second Remix album, Mixed Beats, was released in August 2009. The album includes the singles "What's The Matter With Your Cabrio", "Shoulders of Giants" and "Love Song". Her fifth studio album, The Fire, was released in March 2013. The album includes the singles "What I'd Give", "The Person I Am", "Me Luv U Long Time" and "The Way It's Meant To Be".

== Albums ==
=== Studio albums ===
Title	Details	Peak chart positions	Notes
Title	Details	MAL	Notes
Someone Else	Released: April 28, 2004 (Malta); Format: CD; Label: None	—	No. / Title / Length; 1. / "Day by Day"; 2. / "Love Me or Hate Me"; 3. / "Someone Else"; 4. / "Say Hey"; 5. / "Rocket to Venus"; 6. / "Not About You"; 7. / "Must've Been Good"; 8. / "Who I Am"; 9. / "I'm in Love Again"; 10. / "She"; 11. / "If You Say"; 12. / "So Alive"
Accident Prone	Released: November 16, 2005 (Malta); Format: CD; Label: None	1	
Unmasked	Released: December 6, 2006; Format: CD; Label: None	1	
Fortune Teller	Released: June 11, 2008 (Malta); Format: CD; Label: None	—	
The Fire	Released: March 20, 2013 (Malta); Format: Digital download, CD; Label: Jagged House	—	No. / Title / Length; 1. / "The Way It's Meant to Be"; 2. / "What I'd Give"; 3. / "Is This the Love?"; 4. / "Waiting"; 5. / "Shouldn't Have to Bother"; 6. / "You Never Tried"; 7. / "Me Luv U Long Time"; 8. / "Not for Me"; 9. / "Dead or Alive"; 10. / "The Person I Am"; 11. / "The Fire"
No Sinner No Saint (15th Year Anniversary Double Album)	Released: June 21, 2018 (Malta); Format: Digital download, CD; Label: Jagged House	1	No. / Title / Length; 1. / "OMG" / 4:02; 2. / "Hey Now" / 3:51; 3. / "Holy Water" / 3:28; 4. / "The Only Law" / 2:56; 5. / "We Are the People" / 3:54; 6. / "You're Gone" / 4:24; 7. / "I Wanna Dance" / 4:06; 8. / "Stuck Like That" / 3:53; 9. / "We Are the Soldiers" / 3:22; 10. / "Down the Wire" / 3:01; 11. / "Haunted by Love" / 3:59; 12. / "One in a Million" / 4:11; 13. / "1984" / 3:46; 14. / "High" / 2:55; 15. / "Cannonball" / 4:01; 16. / "Breathe" / 3:56; 17. / "Potion" / 3:37; 18. / "I'd Hate to Be You" / 3:30; 19. / "The Perfect One" / 3:07; 20. / "Bad Habits" / 3:48; 21. / "Money" / 3:20; 22. / "You Did It Again" / 3:30
"—" denotes an album that did not chart or was not released in that territory.

=== Remix albums ===
Title	Details
Blends & Remixes of Someone Else	Released: January 2005 (Malta); Format: CD; Label: None
Mixed Beats	Released: 22 August 2009; Format: CD; Label: None

=== Compilation albums ===
Title
Details
Notes
Hi-Infidelity (with Tiara)
- Released: Summer 2001 (Malta)
- Format: CD
- Label: None

No.	Title	Length
1.	"Riverman"
2.	"Teenage in Love"
3.	"Basketball"
4.	"Some People"
5.	"Basketball" (live at Red TV)

Butterfly
- Released: November 2001 (Malta)
- Format: CD
- Label: None

No.	Title	Length
1.	"Butterfly" (with Jon IQ)
2.	"Don't Give Up"
3.	"Spellbound"
4.	"Shine"
5.	"Summerbreeze"
6.	"Deep Inside My Heart"
7.	"Falling in Love"
8.	"Symbol"
9.	"We'll Ride the Wind"
10.	"Tħallinix"
11.	"Fejn Staħbejtli"
12.	"Blanzun Miksur"
13.	"Hawn Jien Jekk Tridni"

== Singles ==
=== As lead artist ===
Year	Title	Peak chart positions	Album
Year	Title	MAL	Album
1998	"Basketball" (with Tiara)	—	Hi-Infidelity
2000	"Shine" (Malta Song for Europe 2000)	—	Butterfly
2000	"Falling in Love" (Malta Song for Europe 2000)	—	Butterfly
2001	"Spellbound" (Malta Song for Europe 2001)	—	Butterfly
2001	"Don't Give Up" (Malta Song for Europe 2001)	—	Butterfly
2001	"We'll Ride the Wind" (Malta Song for Europe 2001)	—	Butterfly
2001	"Deep Inside My Heart" (Malta Song for Europe 2001)	—	Butterfly
2001	"Butterfly"	—	Butterfly
2001	"Summer Breeze"	—	Butterfly
2001	"Fejn Stahbejtli" (For Indipendenza 2001)	—	Butterfly
2003	"Love Me or Hate Me"	—	Someone Else
2003	"Who I Am"	—	Someone Else
2004	"Someone Else"	—	Someone Else
2004	"Say Hey"	—	Someone Else
2004	"I'm In Love Again"	1	Someone Else
2004	"Must've Been Good"	—	Someone Else
2005	"Everyday"	—	Accident Prone
2005	"Get Out"	—	Accident Prone
2006	"Don't Wanna Talk About It"	—	Accident Prone
2006	"Driving One Of Your Cars"	—	Accident Prone
2006	"Accident Prone"	10	Accident Prone
2006	"Uh-Oh"	11	Accident Prone
2006	"Waking Up To The Light"	—	Accident Prone
2006	"Winter Day"	—	Unmasked
2007	"Arms Of The Ones..."	—	Unmasked
2007	"Something To Talk About"	—	Fortune Teller
2007	"Don't Look Down"	6	Fortune Teller
2008	"Idle Motion"	—	Fortune Teller
2008	"Promises"	—	Fortune Teller
2008	"Elvis Can You Hear Me?"	—	Fortune Teller
2008	"Shoulders of Giants"	—	Fortune Teller
2009	"What's The Matter With You?"	—	Fortune Teller
2009	"Fortune Teller"	—	Fortune Teller
2009	"What's The Matter With Your Cabrio"	—	Mixed Beats
2009	"Shoulders of Giants"	—	Mixed Beats
2009	"Love Song"	—	Mixed Beats
2010	"Something to Talk About"	—	Mixed Beats
2012	"What I'd Give"	—	The Fire
2013	"The Person I Am"	—	The Fire
2013	"Me Luv U Long Time"	—	The Fire
2014	"The Way It's Meant To Be"	—	The Fire
2014	"Shouldn't Have to Bother"	1	The Fire
2015	"Dead or Alive"	4	The Fire
2015	"Haunted by Love"	1	TBA
2015	"Chameleon"	5	Malta in the Eurovision Song Contest 2016
2015	"That's Why I Love You"	14	Malta in the Eurovision Song Contest 2016
2016	"Walk on Water"	1	Eurovision Song Contest 2016
2017	"We are the Soldiers"	1	No Sinner No Saint
2017	"OMG (feat. Shyli)"	1	No Sinner No Saint
2017	"Dominoes (with Fr. Rob Galea)"	—	No Sinner No Saint
2018	"One In A Million"	1	No Sinner No Saint
2018	"Hey Now"	1	No Sinner No Saint
2019	"Cannonball (feat. Michela)"		Non-album singles
2021	"Tbissem"		Non-album singles
2022	"Going For Gold"		Non-album singles
2023	"Rip (Rest in Peace)" (with Aidan)	1	Non-album singles
2023	"Illejla (Hey Now, Maltese Version)"		Non-album singles

== Other appearances ==
Year	Title	Album(s)
2001	"Teleport Me" (with Tiara)	Green Label Collection
2002	"7th Wonder"	Eurovision Song Contest 2002
2002	"Imhabba Projbita"	Ipokriti Soundtrack
2003	"Reaching Higher"	Xth Games of the Small States of Europe Malta 2003
2006	"It'll Be Alright" (featuring Ivan Grech from Wintermoods, Baresine and Konrad Pule` from Scar)	Singing For Bay Kidz
2006	"Driving One of Your Cars" (Ira Losco song)	Singing For Bay Kidz
2023	"L-Imħabba Kelma Kbira Wisq" (The Travellers featuring Ira Losco)	L-Imħabba Kelma Kbira Wisq, single
2023	"Tridx Tkun Tiegħi Dan Il-Milied" (The Travellers featuring Ira Losco, Gianluca, and Michela)	Tridx Tkun Tiegħi Dan Il-Milied, Christmas single

== Covers and re-makes ==
- Ira re-made the track "Say Hey" featuring aspiring singer Caroline Stapley in 2004. The track was just a radio hit and is not featured in any album or single.
- Michelle Hunziker covered the tracks "Get Out", "Love Me Or Hate Me" and "Someone Else" for her debut album "Lole" in 2006.
- "Accident Prone" was remixed by DJ Ruby, Thomas Penton & Alex Armes, but wasn't featured in any album.
- Riffs from "Uh Oh" were sampled on Kelly Clarkson's track "Don't Waste Your Time".
