= List of number-one singles of the 2020s (Malta) =

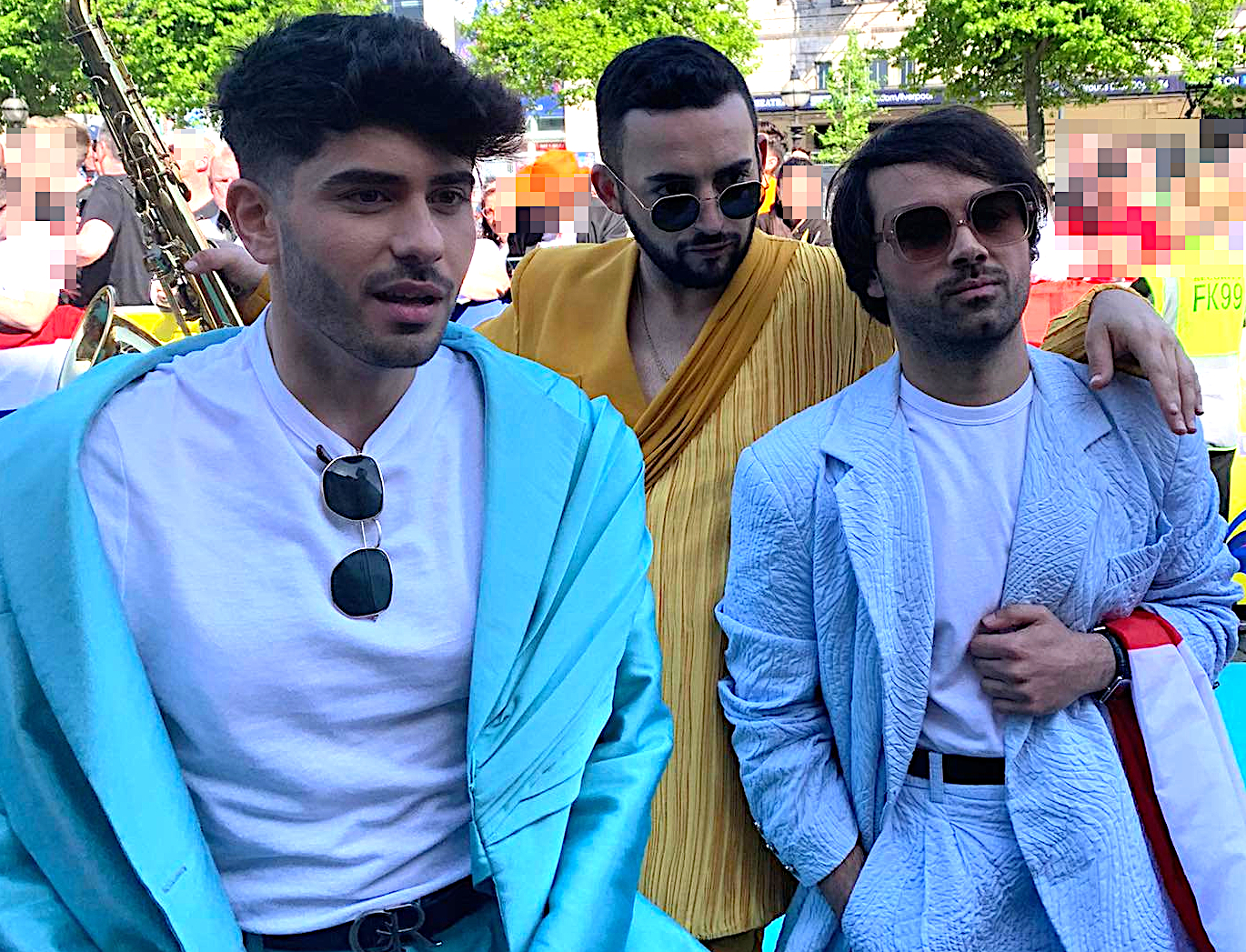
The Busker's single "Dance (Our Own Party)" spent 13 weeks at number one in 2023.

This is a list of the songs that have reached number one on the BMAT PRS Malta domestic airplay chart during the 2020s. The issue date is the date the song began its run at number one during the decade.

== Chart ==
Key

† – Songs partly or entirely in Maltese

Issue date	Song	Artist(s)	Weeks at number one
2020
3 January	"Dive In"	Red Electric	6
14 February	"Venom"	Oxygyn	1
21 February	"Road Trip"	Matthew James	1
28 February	"Dangerous"	Red Electric	10
8 May	"Why Are We Here"	Airport Impressions	1
15 May	"I Will Be Fine"	Red Electric	1
22 May	"1991"	MTeam	5
24 July	"Come Alive"	Red Electric	8
18 September	"Are You With Me"	MTeam	4
16 October	"Wicked White Lies"	Oxygyn	2
30 October	"This is Your Life"	Juno Valdez (Stevy Vee Club Mix)	1
6 November	"Just a Little Bit More"	The Busker and Matthew James	2
20 November	"Somebody Like You"	Aidan	1
27 November	"Just a Little Bit More"	The Busker and Matthew James	3
18 December	"Love"	MTeam	6
2021
29 January	"In the Rain"	Matthew James featuring Ira Losco	2
12 February	"Put Away Your Money"	Amber	1
19 February	"In the Rain"	Matthew James featuring Ira Losco	1
26 February	"You Don't Call"	Nick Morales	2
12 March	"Mistake"	Red Electric featuring Destiny	2
19 March	"Min Jaf"	The New Victorians featuring Lapes	3
9 April	"Naħseb Fik"	Aidan	11
25 June	"Over"	Brooke	3
16 July	"Round and Round"	Matthew James	1
23 July	"Runaway"	Owen Leuellen	1
30 July	"Find Another Way"	Nosnow/Noalps	5
3 September	"Loose"	The Busker	1
10 September	"Remedy"	Carlo Gerada	1
17 September	"Differenti"	Sterjotipi	1
24 September	"24/7"	Carlo Gerada and Aidan	4
22 October	"Inżul U Tlajja’"	The Travellers	2
5 November	"24/7"	Carlo Gerada and Aidan	4
3 December	"Hit & Run"	Lex and Micimago	1
10 December	"Dan Il-Milied"	Amber	4
2022
7 January	"Siġġu Vojt"	The Travellers	1
14 January	"Saving Grace"	Janvil	5
18 February	"Our Own Way"	Luke Cieca	1
25 February	"More than Love"	Chris and Moira	1
4 March	"Ritmu"	Aidan	2
18 March	"Ħobbni Kemm Trid"	The Travellers	2
1 April	"Ritmu"	Aidan	4
29 April	"I Am What I Am"	Emma Muscat	3
20 May	"Fejn Mar Il-Kwiet?"	The Travellers	7
8 July	"H8 That I H8 U"	Megan May	2
15 July	"Is-Sbuħija Ta’ dan Iż-Żmien"	The Travellers	3
5 August	"Fix Of You"	Red Electric	9
30 September	"Devil"	Red Electric	3
28 October	"Simili"	The Travellers	6
9 December	"Vampire"	Red Electric	5
2023
15 January	"Simili"	The Travellers	1
22 January	"Rip (Rest in Peace)"	Aidan and Ira Losco	1
29 January	"Ħdejja"	The Travellers	2
12 February	"Count On You"	Shaun Farrugia	2
26 February	"Dance (Our Own Party)"	The Busker	13
28 May	"Pupa"	Aidan	8
6 August	"Mhux Xorta"	Matthew James	3
27 August	"Pupa"	Aidan	2
10 September	"Strawberry"	Aidan	6
5 November	"Why?"	Gaia Cauchi	1
12 November	"Head & Mind"	NaBBoo and Aidan	2
24 December	"Tridx Tkun Tiegħi Dan Il-Milied?"	The Travellers featuring Ira Losco, Gianluca and Michela	2
2024
7 January	"Humans"	Vikkstar featuring Shaun Farrugia	4
18 February	"Time Flies"	Red Electric	7
7 April	"Juliette"	Aidan	2
21 April	"Time Flies"	Red Electric	1
28 April	"Loop"	Sarah Bonnici	4
26 May	"Juliette"	Aidan	3
9 June	"Cupid"	Gaia Cauchi	1
16 June	"Juliette"	Aidan	4
14 July	"Same Old Story"	Midnight, Joe Roscoe and Kevin Paul	1
21 July	"Wherever You Are"	Martin Garrix, DubVision featuring Shaun Farrugia	3
11 August	"Same Old Story"	Midnight, Joe Roscoe and Kevin Paul	2
25 August	"Hero"	Aidan	11
17 November	"Sorry"	Aidan	4
15 December	"Crying Alone On A Saturday Night"	Shaun Farrugia	2
29 December	"Wish Every Day Could Be Like Christmas"	Fabrizio Faniello	1
2025
5 January	"Crying Alone On A Saturday Night"	Shaun Farrugia	1
12 January	"Sorry"	Aidan	3
31 January	"Feelings For You"	Klingande and Shaun Farrugia	3
21 February	"Kant"	Miriana Conte	11
