= Reġina =

2023 single by Aidan

Single by Aidan

from the album This Is Aidan
- Language: English; Maltese; Spanish
- Released: 12 February 2023
- Genre: Pop
- Length: 2:23
- Songwriters: Aidan Cassar; Boban Apostolov
- Producer: Boban Apostolov

Aidan singles chronology
"Rip (Rest in Peace)" (2023)	"Reġina" (2023)	"Hey Anna" (2023)

Live performance
- "Reġina" on YouTube

"Reġina" (Maltese pronunciation: [rɛˈd͡ʒiːnɐ]; transl. "Queen") is a song by Maltese singer Aidan released on 12 February 2023. The song was disqualified from representing Malta in the Eurovision Song Contest 2023 but reached number two on Malta's singles charts.

== Background and release ==
"Reġina" was produced by Boban Apostolov and features lyrics in three different languages: Maltese, English and Spanish. The song was dedicated to Aidan's mother.

The song was described as "one of the favourites" to win the competition by Giulia Magri of the Times of Malta and as the "straight-up winner from the get go" by Culture Fix but was disqualified from the competition due to unauthorised social media posts. Aidan was later asked to perform as an interval act during the final of the national competition under the condition that he did not sing his disqualified entry. On 12 February 2023, a day after the national final, Aidan made the song available on streaming platforms and released a live performance video in which he wore the designer outfit that he would have worn had he not been disqualified.

"Reġina" was featured in his debut album This Is Aidan released in March 2023.

== Critical reception ==
The song reached number two on Malta's weekly singles charts behind the winning song of Malta's national competition, "Dance (Our Own Party)" by the Busker, and placed number nine on Malta's yearly chart of 2023. Culture Fix praised the song's "pulsating grooves" and Aidan's "confident vocal turn".

== Charts ==
=== Weekly charts ===
Weekly chart performance for "Reġina"
Chart (2023)	Peak position
Malta Domestic Airplay (BMAT PRS)	2

=== Yearly charts ===
Year-end chart performance for "Reġina"
Chart (2023)	Peak position
Malta Domestic Airplay (BMAT PRS)	9
