= Malta in the Eurovision Song Contest 2023 =

- Eurovision Song Contest 2023
- Participating broadcaster: Public Broadcasting Services (PBS)
- Country: Malta
- Selection process: Malta Eurovision Song Contest 2023
- Selection date: 11 February 2023

Competing entry
- Song: "Dance (Our Own Party)"
- Artist: The Busker
- Songwriters: David Meilak; Jean Paul Borg; Sean Meachen; Matthew James Borg; Michael Joe Cini

Placement
- Semi-final result: Failed to qualify (15th)

Participation chronology

Malta was represented at the Eurovision Song Contest 2023 with the song "Dance (Our Own Party)", written by David Meilak, Jean Paul Borg, Sean Meachen, Matthew James Borg, and Michael Joe Cini, and performed by the band The Busker. The Maltese participating broadcaster, Public Broadcasting Services (PBS), selected its entry for the contest through the national final Malta Eurovision Song Contest 2023. The competition consisted of three quarter-final rounds, a semi-final round and a final, held between 13 January and 11 February 2023, where "Dance (Our Own Party)" performed by the Busker eventually emerged as the winning entry after scoring the most points from a five-member jury and a public televote.

Malta was drawn to compete in the first semi-final of the Eurovision Song Contest which took place on 9 May 2023. Performing during the show in position 2, "Dance (Our Own Party)" was not announced among the top 10 entries of the first semi-final and therefore did not qualify to compete in the final. It was later revealed that Malta placed last out of the 15 participating countries in the semi-final with 3 points.

== Background ==
Prior to the 2023 contest, the Maltese Broadcasting Authority (MBA) until 1975, and the Public Broadcasting Services (PBS) since 1991, have participated in the Eurovision Song Contest representing Malta thirty-four times since MBA's first entry in 1971. MBA briefly competed in the contest in the 1970s before withdrawing for sixteen years, while PBS competed in every contest since its return in 1991. Their best placing in the contest thus far was second, achieved on two occasions: in 2002 with the song "7th Wonder" performed by Ira Losco and in the 2005 contest with the song "Angel" performed by Chiara. In 2022, "I Am What I Am" performed by Emma Muscat failed to qualify for the final.

As part of its duties as participating broadcaster, PBS organises the selection of its entry in the Eurovision Song Contest and broadcasts the event in the country. In 2022, PBS selected its entry through a national final procedure, a method that was continued for its 2023 participation.

== Before Eurovision ==
=== Malta Eurovision Song Contest 2023 ===
Malta Eurovision Song Contest 2023 was the national final format developed by PBS to select its entry for the Eurovision Song Contest 2023. The competition consisted of five shows which commenced on 13 January 2023 and concluded with a final held on 11 February 2023. All shows were broadcast on Television Malta (TVM) as well as on the broadcaster's website tvmnews.mt.

==== Format ====
The competition consisted of three phases. The first phase was the three quarter-finals on 13, 20 and 27 January 2023 where 40 songs competed and the top twenty-four entries qualified. The second phase was the semi-final on 9 February 2023 where the top sixteen entries qualified to compete in the third phase, the final on 11 February 2023. Five judges evaluated the songs during the three phases and the results of the public televote had a weighting equal to the total votes of the judges in the final result. Ties in the final results were broken based on the entry which received the higher score from the judges. Monetary prizes were also given to the competing artists: the winner received €10,000, the runner-up received €4,000, the second runner-up received €2,000 and the remaining artists received €300 each. Former Maltese Eurovision entrants Paul Giordimaina (1991), Moira Stafrace (1994), Mike Spiteri (1995) and Ludwig Galea (2004) were appointed as consultants of the competition in order to offer support to the artists. The five members of the jury that evaluated the entries during all phases consisted of:

- Sergio Gor – Publisher
- Corazon Mizzi – Singer-songwriter
- Matthew Bugeja – Conductor
- Antoine Farrugia – Artistic director of Notte Bianca
- Dorothy Bezzina – Singer

==== Competing entries ====
Artists and composers were able to submit their entries between 17 October 2022 and 31 October 2022. Songwriters from any nationality were able to submit songs as long as the artist were Maltese or possessed Maltese citizenship. Artists were able to submit as many songs as they wished, however, they could only compete with one in the quarter-finals. Emma Muscat, who represented Malta in 2022, was unable to compete due to a rule that prevented the previous winner from competing in the following competition. The 40 songs selected to compete in the quarter-finals were announced on 21 November 2022. Among the selected competing artists are former Eurovision entrants Fabrizio Faniello who represented Malta in 2001 and in 2006, Jessika who represented San Marino in 2018, Francesca Sciberras who represented Malta in the Junior Eurovision Song Contest 2009, and Eliana Gomez Blanco who represented Malta in the Junior Eurovision Song Contest 2019.

Artist	Song	Songwriter(s)
Aidan	"Reġina"	Aidan Cassar, Boban Apostolov
Andre'	"Broken Hill"	Toby Farrugia, David Cassar Torreggiani, Andre' Portelli
Bradley Debono	"Blackout"	Christina Magrin
Brooke	"Checkmate"	Brooke Borg, Gerard James Borg, Christian Rabb, Dino Medanhodzic, Lukas Meijer
Cheryl Balzan	"La La Land"	David Cassar Torreggiani, Cheryl Balzan, Toby Farrugia
Chris Grech	"Indescribable"	Joakim Dubbelman, Gerard James Borg, Jesper Rune, Arve Furset
Christian Arding	"Eku Ċar"	Jan van Dijck, Emil Calleja Bayliss
Clintess	"Lura Qatt"	Dominic Cini, Etienne Micallef
Dan	"It'll Be OK"	Daniel Muscat Caruana
Dario	"Pawn in a Game"	Henric Pierroff, Emil Vaker, Karin Pierroff
Dario Bezzina	"Bridle Road"	Martin Älenmark, Darren Michaels, Charlie Mason
Dominic and Anna	"Whatever Wind May Blow"	Alexander Berger, Michael Tauben, Will Taylor, Jonas Gladnikoff
Eliana Gomez Blanco	"Guess What"	Ray Agius, Alfred C. Sant
Fabrizio Faniello	"Try to Be Better"	Johan Bejerholm
Francesca Sciberras	"Masquerade"	Marco Debono, Rita Pace
Geo Debono	"The Mirror"	Daniele Moretti, Natasha Turner, Niall Mooney
Giada	"I Depend on You"	Melanie Georgiou
Greta Tude	"Sound of My Stilettos"	Cyprian Cassar, Muxu, Antoine Farrugia
Haley	"Tik Tok"	Philip Vella, Gerard James Borg
Ian	"On My Own"	Melanie Georgiou
Jake	"Love You Like That"	Primož Poglajen, Jonas Gladnikoff, Michael James Down
James Louis	"Dream"	James Mifsud
Jason Scerri	"Anything Can Happen"	Jason Scerri
Jessika	"Unapologetic"	Jessica Muscat, Stefan Moessle
John Galea	"Trailblazer"	John Galea
Kirstie	"Girls Get Down"	Cyprian Cassar, Muxu
Klinsmann	"Piranha"	Mats Ygfors, Robin Svensson, Magdalena Ohlin, Gerard James Borg
Lyndsay	"Haunted"	Michael James Down, Will Taylor, Primož Poglajen, Jonas Gladnikoff, Johnny Sanchez, Sara Ljunggren
Maria Christina	"Our Flame"	Erik Horvath, Rickard Bonde Truumeel, Ylva Persson, Linda Persson, Emil Calleja Bayliss
Maria Debono	"X'Allegrija"	Cyprian Cassar, Muxu, Maria Debono
Marie Claire	"Thankful"	Thorghy Landgren, Thomas Rodin, Rickard Bonde Truumeel, Ylva Persson, Linda Persson, Emil Calleja Bayliss
Mark Anthony Bartolo	"Tears"	Mark Anthony Bartolo
Matt Blxck	"Up"	Matthew Caruana, Cyprian Cassar
Maxine Pace	"Alone"	Steve Manovski, Shaun Farrugia
Mikhail	"Leħen fiċ-Ċpar"	Cyprian Cassar, Cliff Casha
Nathan	"Creeping Walls"	Dominic Cini, Jonas Gladnikoff, Emil Calleja Bayliss
Ryan Hili	"In the Silence"	Aaron Sibley, Natan Dagur, Cyprian Cassar
Stefan Galea	"Heartbreaker"	Stefan Galea, Rikki Lee Scicluna, Muxu
Stefan Xuereb	"What Do You Want?"	Richard Micallef, Aidan O'Connor
The Busker	"Dance (Our Own Party)"	David Meilak, Jean Paul Borg, Sean Meachen, Matthew James Borg, Michael Joe Cini

==== Quarter-finals ====
The three quarter-finals took place at the TVM studios in Pietà on 13, 20 and 27 January 2023 and were hosted by Ryan Borg and Josmar Gatt. On 23 January 2023, Aidan was disqualified from the quarter-finals for violating the competition's social media promotion policy. The remaining thirty-nine songs competed for twenty-four qualifying spots in the semi-final which were announced during a special programme on 3 February 2023. The allocation for the quarter-finals was announced on 6 January 2023.

Quarter-final 1 – 13 January 2023
R/O	Artist	Song	Result
1	Haley	"Tik Tok"	Eliminated
2	Stefan Xuereb	"What Do You Want?"	Eliminated
3	Clintess	"Lura Qatt"	Eliminated
4	Fabrizio Faniello	"Try to Be Better"	Advanced
5	Eliana Gomez Blanco	"Guess What"	Advanced
6	Christian Arding	"Eku Ċar"	Advanced
7	Jason Scerri	"Anything Can Happen"	Eliminated
8	Maria Debono	"X'Allegrija"	Eliminated
9	Geo Debono	"The Mirror"	Advanced
10	Mikhail	"Leħen fiċ-Ċpar"	Advanced
11	~~Aidan~~	~~"Reġina"~~	Disqualified
12	Nathan	"Creeping Walls"	Advanced
13	Klinsmann	"Piranha"	Advanced

Quarter-final 2 – 20 January 2023
R/O	Artist	Song	Result
1	Francesca Sciberras	"Masquerade"	Eliminated
2	The Busker	"Dance (Our Own Party)"	Advanced
3	Lyndsay	"Haunted"	Eliminated
4	Maxine Pace	"Alone"	Advanced
5	Marie Claire	"Thankful"	Eliminated
6	Ian	"On My Own"	Advanced
7	Kirstie	"Girls Get Down"	Eliminated
8	Dario Bezzina	"Bridle Road"	Advanced
9	Brooke	"Checkmate"	Advanced
10	Mark Anthony Bartolo	"Tears"	Advanced
11	Dan	"It'll Be OK"	Advanced
12	Dario	"Pawn in a Game"	Eliminated
13	Matt Blxck	"Up."	Advanced

Quarter-final 3 – 27 January 2023
R/O	Artist	Song	Result
1	Andre'	"Broken Hill"	Advanced
2	Bradley Debono	"Blackout"	Advanced
3	Cheryl Balzan	"La La Land"	Advanced
4	James Louis	"Dream"	Eliminated
5	Dominic and Anna	"Whatever Wind May Blow"	Advanced
6	Greta Tude	"Sound of My Stilettos"	Advanced
7	Ryan Hili	"In the Silence"	Advanced
8	Jessika	"Unapologetic"	Eliminated
9	Stefan Galea	"Heartbreaker"	Advanced
10	Giada	"I Depend on You"	Advanced
11	John Galea	"Trailblazer"	Eliminated
12	Jake	"Love You Like That"	Eliminated
13	Chris Grech	"Indescribable"	Advanced
14	Maria Christina	"Our Flame"	Eliminated

==== Semi-final ====
The semi-final took place on 9 February 2023 at the Malta Fairs and Conventions Centre in Ta' Qali and was hosted by former Maltese Eurovision entrants Glen Vella, who represented Malta in 2011, and Amber, who represented Malta in 2015. The twenty-four entries that qualified from the quarter-finals competed for sixteen qualifying spots in the final. The show was opened with a guest performance by competition consultants Paul Giordimaina, Moira Stafrace, Mike Spiteri and Ludwig Galea, while the interval act featured a guest performance by the 2022 Maltese Junior Eurovision entrant Gaia Gambuzza performing "Diamonds in the Skies", and a medley of past non-winning songs in the Malta Eurovision Song Contest performed by Catherine Vigar, Claudia Faniello, Eleanor Cassar, Janice Mangion, Lawrence Gray, Olivia Lewis, Pamela Bezzina, Richard Micallef and Pamela Bezzina.

Semi-final – 9 February 2023
R/O	Artist	Song	Result
1	Greta Tude	"Sound of My Stilettos"	Eliminated
2	Fabrizio Faniello	"Try to Be Better"	Advanced
3	Eliana Gomez Blanco	"Guess What"	Advanced
4	Andre'	"Broken Hill"	Eliminated
5	Dan	"It'll Be OK"	Advanced
6	Ian	"On My Own"	Advanced
7	Ryan Hili	"In the Silence"	Advanced
8	Mark Anthony Bartolo	"Tears"	Eliminated
9	Cheryl Balzan	"La La Land"	Advanced
10	Dario Bezzina	"Bridle Road"	Eliminated
11	Nathan	"Creeping Walls"	Advanced
12	Chris Grech	"Indescribable"	Advanced
13	Brooke	"Checkmate"	Advanced
14	Christian Arding	"Eku Ċar"	Advanced
15	Klinsmann	"Piranha"	Eliminated
16	Bradley Debono	"Blackout"	Eliminated
17	Geo Debono	"The Mirror"	Advanced
18	The Busker	"Dance (Our Own Party)"	Advanced
19	Maxine Pace	"Alone"	Advanced
20	Dominic and Anna	"Whatever Wind May Blow"	Eliminated
21	Giada	"I Depend on You"	Advanced
22	Stefan Galea	"Heartbreaker"	Advanced
23	Mikhail	"Leħen fiċ-Ċpar"	Eliminated
24	Matt Blxck	"Up."	Advanced

==== Final ====
The final took place on 11 February 2023 at the Malta Fairs and Conventions Centre in Ta' Qali and was hosted by former Maltese Eurovision entrants Glen Vella, who represented Malta in 2011, and Amber, who represented Malta in 2015. The sixteen entries that qualified from the semi-final were performed again and the 50/50 combination of votes of a five-member jury panel and the results of public televoting determined the winner. The show was opened with a guest performance by the Annalise Dance Studio, while the interval act featured the show hosts Glen Vella and Amber, and performances by Aidan and the previous year's winner Emma Muscat performing "I Am What I Am". After the votes from the jury panel and televote were combined, "Dance (Our Own Party)" performed by the Busker was the winner.

Final – 11 February 2023
R/O	Artist	Song	Jury	Televote	Total	Place
1	Nathan	"Creeping Walls"	3	9	12	11
2	Chris Grech	"Indescribable"	27	7	34	6
3	Maxine Pace	"Alone"	28	45	73	4
4	Fabrizio Faniello	"Try to Be Better"	12	9	21	8
5	Geo Debono	"The Mirror"	0	3	3	15
6	Brooke	"Checkmate"	39	31	70	5
7	Ian	"On My Own"	19	3	22	7
8	Eliana Gomez Blanco	"Guess What"	10	10	20	9
9	The Busker	"Dance (Our Own Party)"	41	80	121	1
10	Giada	"I Depend on You"	1	2	3	14
11	Matt Blxck	"Up."	45	31	76	3
12	Cheryl Balzan	"La La Land"	5	4	9	13
13	Christian Arding	"Eku Ċar"	11	6	17	10
14	Ryan Hili	"In the Silence"	41	44	85	2
15	Dan	"It'll Be OK"	8	2	10	12
16	Stefan	"Heartbreaker"	0	3	3	16

Detailed Jury Votes
R/O	Song	S. Gor	C. Mizzi	M. Bugeja	A. Farrugia	D. Bezzina	Total
1	"Creeping Walls"		2	1			3
2	"Indescribable"	6	8	4	4	5	27
3	"Alone"	2	6	6	10	4	28
4	"Try to Be Better"	4	1	2	5		12
5	"The Mirror"						0
6	"Checkmate"	12	5	10	6	6	39
7	"On My Own"	8	3			8	19
8	"Guess What"	7				3	10
9	"Dance (Our Own Party)"	5	7	5	12	12	41
10	"I Depend on You"	1					1
11	"Up."	10	10	7	8	10	45
12	"La La Land"			3	2		5
13	"Eku Ċar"			8	1	2	11
14	"In the Silence"	3	12	12	7	7	41
15	"It'll Be OK"		4		3	1	8
16	"Heartbreaker"						0

==== Ratings ====
Viewing figures by show
Show	Date	Viewers	Ref.
Final	11 February 2023	265,000	

=== Controversy ===
==== Disqualification of Aidan ====
On 23 January 2023, Aidan was disqualified from the competition due to "the engagement of marketing personnel, marketing officials, marketing companies or the engagement into some sort of marketing or promotional campaign or activity by the artists to promote themselves, the song, their participation, or in some way to influence the public vote" and "the publication of any social media posts, promotion material, interviews or any media presence from the announcement of the quarter-finalists onwards", which is in breach of the rules. Aidan had posted multiple unauthorised social media posts, despite having been warned repeatedly by PBS of potential disqualificaiton. An online petition was launched to bring the singer back into the competition, gaining over one thousand signatures. In response, Aidan's team threatened to take legal steps, unless he was allowed to participate in the contest, arguing that he had been singled out for punishment by the broadcaster, and claiming other contestants had also published a number of unauthorised social media posts. Aidan dropped his threat of a lawsuit on 31 January, citing the possibility that such an action could cause the cancelation of the entire selection event. The singer was instead invited to perform as an interval act during the final of Malta Eurovision Song Contest 2023, with the stipulation that he not sing his disqualified entry "Reġina".

=== Promotion ===
The Busker made several appearances across Europe to specifically promote "Dance (Our Own Party)" as the Maltese Eurovision entry. On 1 April, the Busker performed during the Polish Eurovision Party, which was held at the Praga Centrum in Warsaw, Poland and hosted by Poli Genova and Konrad Zemlik. Between 2 and 4 April, the band took part in promotional activities in Tel Aviv, Israel and performed during the Israel Calling event held at Hangar 11 of the Tel Aviv Port. On 8 April, the band performed during the PrePartyES event, which was held at the Sala La Riviera venue in Madrid, Spain and hosted by Victor Escudero, SuRie and Ruslana. The Busker also performed during the Eurovision in Concert event which was held on 15 April at the AFAS Live venue in Amsterdam, Netherlands and hosted by Cornald Maas and Hila Noorzai, and at the London Eurovision Party, which was held on 16 April at the Here at Outernet venue in London, United Kingdom and hosted by Nicki French and Paddy O'Connell.

== At Eurovision ==
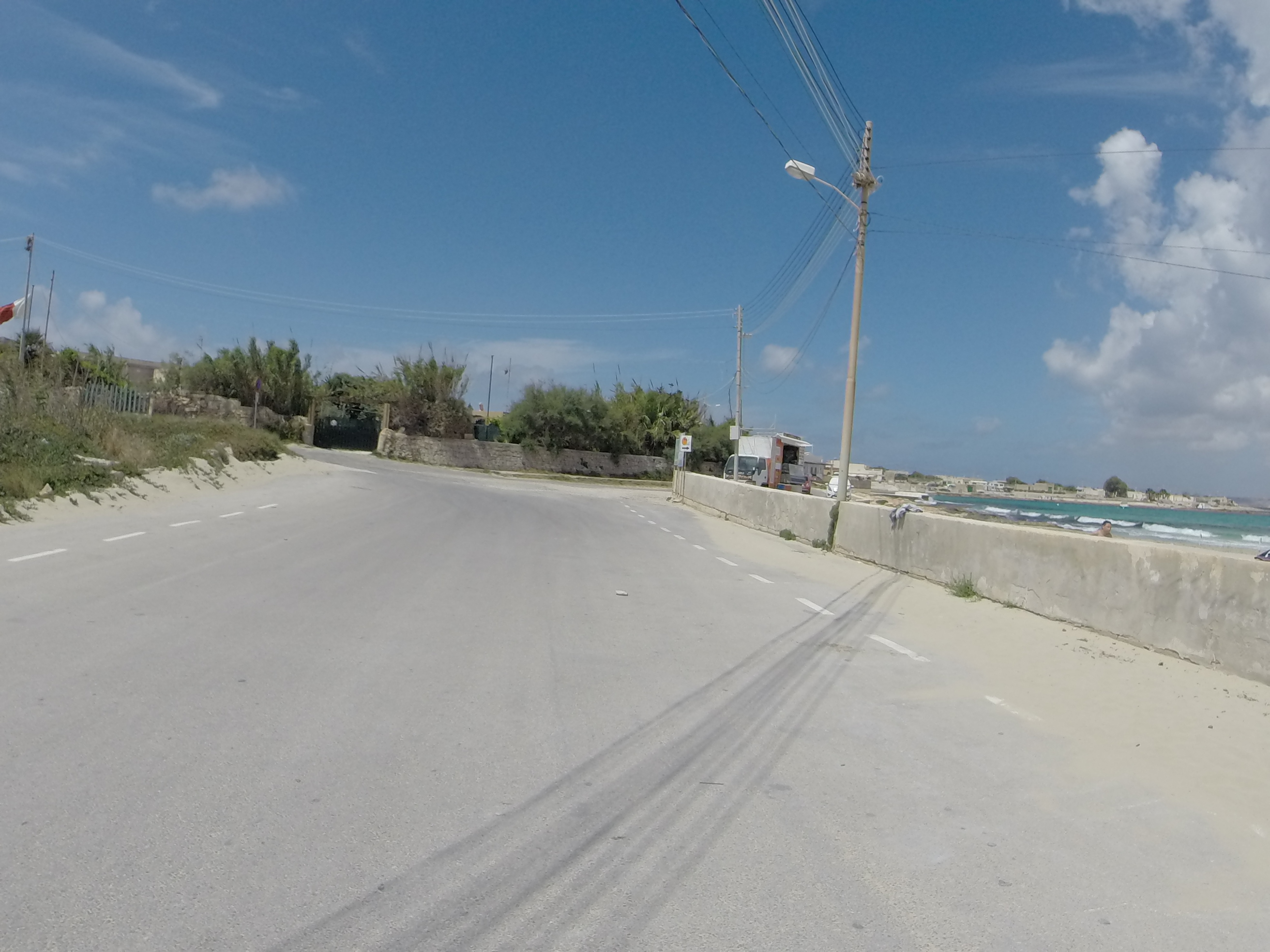
A video postcard introduced the Busker's performance in the first semi-final of the Eurovision Song Contest 2023. The postcard was filmed in Mellieħa in March 2023 in collaboration with the host broadcaster BBC. The London red double-decker bus and the Lviv autobus were also featured in the Maltese postcard.

According to Eurovision rules, all nations with the exceptions of the host country and the "Big Five" (France, Germany, Italy, Spain and the United Kingdom) are required to qualify from one of two semi-finals in order to compete for the final; the top ten countries from each semi-final progress to the final. The European Broadcasting Union (EBU) split up the competing countries into six different pots based on voting patterns from previous contests, with countries with favourable voting histories put into the same pot. On 31 January 2023, an allocation draw was held, which placed each country into one of the two semi-finals, and determined which half of the show they would perform in. Malta has been placed into the first semi-final, to be held on 9 May 2023, and has been scheduled to perform in the first half of the show.

Once all the competing songs for the 2023 contest had been released, the running order for the semi-finals was decided by the shows' producers rather than through another draw, so that similar songs were not placed next to each other. Malta was set to perform in position 2, following the entry from Norway and before the entry from Serbia.

The two semi-finals and the final were broadcast in Malta on TVM. The Maltese spokesperson, who announced the top 12 points awarded by the Maltese jury during the final, was Ryan Hili.

=== Semi-final ===
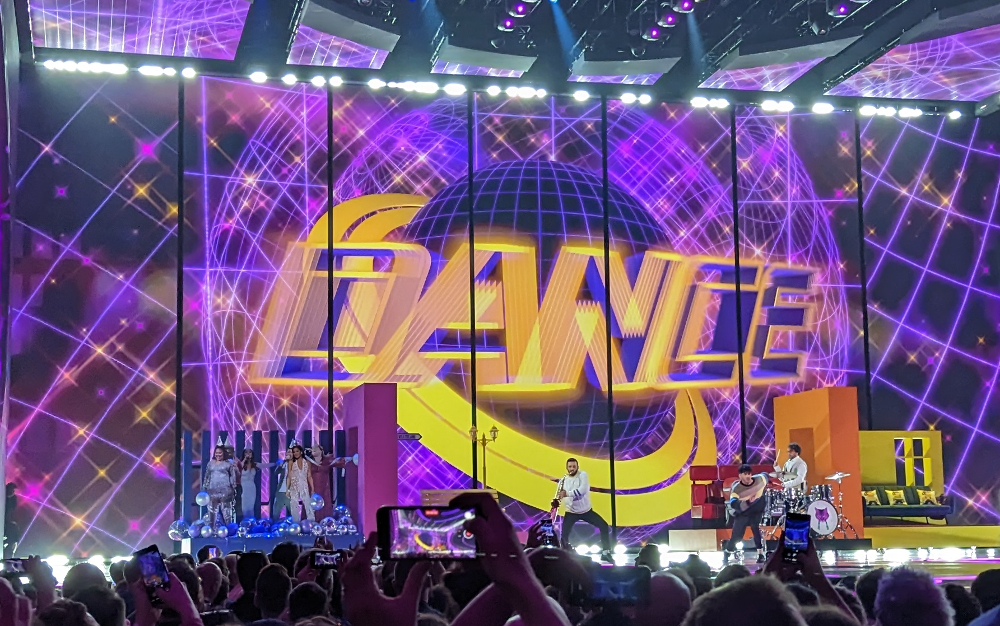
The Busker during a rehearsal before the first semi-final

The Busker took part in technical rehearsals on 30 April and 3 May, followed by dress rehearsals on 8 and 9 May. This included the jury show on 8 May where the professional back-up juries of each country watched and voted in a result used if any issues with public televoting occurred.

The Maltese performance featured the members of the Busker wearing sweaters and interacting with several props, including a park bench, a lamp post, a tiny house, a car and cardboard cut-outs of former Maltese Eurovision acts, in three parts with the background LED screens projecting colorful graphics. Towards the end of the performance, the band faced away from the audience with their sweaters being replaced by silver sequins.

At the end of the show, Malta was not announced as having finished in the top 10 and did not qualify for the grand final. It was later revealed that Malta placed fifteenth (last) in the semi-final, receiving a total of 3 points.

=== Voting ===
Voting during the three shows involved each country awarding sets of points from 1-8, 10 and 12: one from their professional jury and the other from televoting in the final vote, while the semi-final vote was based entirely on the vote of the public. Each nation's jury consisted of five music industry professionals who are citizens of the country they represent. This jury judged each entry based on: vocal capacity; the stage performance; the song's composition and originality; and the overall impression by the act. In addition, each member of a national jury may only take part in the panel once every three years, and no jury was permitted to discuss of their vote with other members or be related in any way to any of the competing acts in such a way that they cannot vote impartially and independently. The individual rankings of each jury member in an anonymised form as well as the nation's televoting results were released shortly after the grand final.

Below is a breakdown of points awarded to Malta and awarded by Malta in the first semi-final and grand final of the contest, and the breakdown of the jury voting and televoting conducted during the two shows:

==== Points awarded to Malta ====
Points awarded to Malta (Semi-final 1)
Score	Televote
12 points	
10 points	
8 points	
7 points	
6 points	
5 points	
4 points	
3 points	
2 points	Israel
1 point	Rest of the World

==== Points awarded by Malta ====
Points awarded by Malta (Semi-final 1)
Score	Televote
12 points	Sweden
10 points	Norway
8 points	Israel
7 points	Finland
6 points	Switzerland
5 points	Serbia
4 points	Portugal
3 points	Ireland
2 points	Czech Republic
1 point	Moldova

Points awarded by Malta (Final)
Score	Televote	Jury
12 points	Italy	Sweden
10 points	Sweden	Italy
8 points	Finland	Finland
7 points	Norway	Israel
6 points	Israel	Switzerland
5 points	Ukraine	Cyprus
4 points	United Kingdom	Lithuania
3 points	Albania	Portugal
2 points	Serbia	Norway
1 point	France	Austria

==== Detailed voting results ====
The following members comprised the Maltese jury:

- Emil Calleja Bayliss
- Gerard James Borg
- Ludwig Galea
- Brooke Borg
- Moira Stafrace

Detailed voting results from Malta (Semi-final 1)
R/O	Country	Televote	
R/O	Country	Rank	Points
01	Norway	2	10
02	Malta		
03	Serbia	6	5
04	Latvia	14	
05	Portugal	7	4
06	Ireland	8	3
07	Croatia	12	
08	Switzerland	5	6
09	Israel	3	8
10	Moldova	10	1
11	Sweden	1	12
12	Azerbaijan	13	
13	Czech Republic	9	2
14	Netherlands	11	
15	Finland	4	7

Detailed voting results from Malta (Final)
R/O	Country	Jury							Televote	
R/O	Country	Juror 1	Juror 2	Juror 3	Juror 4	Juror 5	Rank	Points	Rank	Points
01	Austria	17	4	13	12	11	10	1	13	
02	Portugal	6	22	18	5	7	8	3	25	
03	Switzerland	4	5	8	7	4	5	6	11	
04	Poland	20	25	17	23	14	22		12	
05	Serbia	19	26	24	26	12	21		9	2
06	France	15	17	7	15	18	15		10	1
07	Cyprus	9	6	12	6	6	6	5	14	
08	Spain	16	24	19	14	25	20		26	
09	Sweden	3	1	1	9	1	1	12	2	10
10	Albania	22	15	20	11	19	17		8	3
11	Italy	1	7	4	1	2	2	10	1	12
12	Estonia	21	23	23	17	24	25		24	
13	Finland	2	2	2	4	5	3	8	3	8
14	Czech Republic	24	11	21	25	26	19		22	
15	Australia	12	9	14	16	10	13		23	
16	Belgium	7	16	15	20	13	14		20	
17	Armenia	13	10	9	8	15	11		15	
18	Moldova	14	21	22	18	23	23		18	
19	Ukraine	11	12	10	13	8	12		6	5
20	Norway	8	8	5	10	17	9	2	4	7
21	Germany	25	20	26	24	22	26		16	
22	Lithuania	10	18	11	2	9	7	4	19	
23	Israel	5	3	3	3	3	4	7	5	6
24	Slovenia	23	13	25	21	21	24		21	
25	Croatia	26	19	6	22	20	16		17	
26	United Kingdom	18	14	16	19	16	18		7	4
