= Ritmu =

2022 single by Aidan

Single by Aidan

from the album This Is Aidan
- Language: Maltese
- Released: 2 March 2022
- Genre: Pop
- Length: 2:57
- Songwriters: Aidan Cassar; Boban Apostolov
- Producer: Boban Apostolov

Aidan singles chronology
"24/7" (2021)	"Ritmu" (2022)	"Madam" (2022)

Music video
- "Ritmu" on YouTube

"Ritmu" (Note: Stylised in all uppercase.) (Maltese pronunciation: [ˈrɪtmʊ]; transl. "Rhythm") is a song by Maltese singer Aidan released on 2 March 2022. The song placed second in the national competition to represent Malta in the Eurovision Song Contest 2022 and reached number one on Malta's singles charts.

== Background and release ==
Aidan unsuccessfully competed to represent Malta in the 2018 contest in which his song "Dai Laga" was updated as it was reportedly not entirely original and could have potentially violated Eurovision rules. Following the positive response to "Naħseb Fik", he announced he would be competing to represent Malta in the Eurovision Song Contest 2022 with an "upbeat pop song with a very European sound" written in Maltese. The song was later revealed to be "Ritmu" and he placed second in the national competition behind Emma Muscat. Aidan performed the song at a Eurovision pre-party in London. He was also chosen as Malta's spokesperson in the Eurovision final in which he read out the votes of the Maltese jury.

"Ritmu" was featured in his debut album This Is Aidan released in March 2023.

== Critical reception ==
The song was number one in Malta's singles charts for three consecutive weeks. The song was reviewed by four correspondents at ESC United who gave it an average score of 7.125. The correspondents pointed out that the beat of the song felt "generic" but that it being in Maltese made it stand out from other songs in the national competition.

The song won an award for Best Song of the Year.

== Music video ==
The music video released on 8 March 2022 features Aidan dressed as a cowboy and riding a horse. The video was produced by Joseph Cauchi, directed by Gary Bugeja and shot by Victor Abela. Additionally, the choreography was done by Cheryl Lofreda and the styling by Malcolm Gauci.

== Charts ==
Chart performance for "Ritmu"
Chart (2022)	Peak position
Malta Domestic Airplay (BMAT PRS)	1

== See also ==
- List of number-one singles of the 2020s (Malta)
