= Hey Now =

Hey Now may refer to:

- Hey Now! (Remixes & Rarities), a 2005 album by Cyndi Lauper
- "Hey now!", a catchphrase from The Larry Sanders Show

== Songs ==
- "Hey Now" (Lesley Gore song), 1964
- "Hey Now" (London Grammar song), 2014
- "Hey Now" (Kendrick Lamar song), 2024
- "Hey Now" (Ira Losco song), 2019
- "Hey Now" (Martin Solveig song), 2013
- "Hey Now" (Tantric song), 2003
- "Hey Now (Girls Just Want to Have Fun)", by Cyndi Lauper, 1994
- "Hey Now (Mean Muggin)", by Xzibit, 2004
- "Hey Now", by Eddie Floyd
- "Hey Now", by FM Static from What Are You Waiting For?
- "Hey Now!", by Oasis from (What's the Story) Morning Glory?
- "Hey Now", by Pinhead Gunpowder from Fahizah
- "Hey Now", by the Platters
- "Hey Now", by Red Garland from Groovy
- "Hey Now", by the Regrettes Feel Your Feelings Fool!
- "Hey Now", by Talking Heads from True Stories
- "Hey Now", by TobyMac from Welcome to Diverse City

== See also ==
- Hey Now Hey (The Other Side of the Sky), a 1973 album by Aretha Franklin
- "Hey Now Now", a 1998 song by Swirl 360
- "Iko Iko"
