= List of awards and nominations received by Ira Losco =

This is the list of awards and nominations given to Ira Losco. On 13 December 2008, a national holiday in Malta in remembrance of Malta becoming a Republic, Ira Losco was awarded a national medal for work done which helped the country in such a short time - Gieh ir-Repubblika.

== Awards and nominations ==
=== 2001 ===
Independence Song Contest 2001

- Fejn Stahbejtli – Won

=== 2002 ===
Eurovision Song Contest 2002

- 7th Wonder – 2nd place

=== 2003 ===
Malta Music Awards 2003

- Best Image – Won
- Best Female Artist – Won
- Best CD Single - 7th Wonder – Nominee

=== 2004 ===
Tune In's Battle Of The Babes

- Battle Of The Babes – Won

Bay Music Awards

- Best Solo Artist – Won
- Best Single – Nominee

=== 2005 ===
Bay Music Awards

- Best Solo Artist – Nominee
- Best Single - Everyday – Nominee
- Best Song Of All Time - Love Me Or Hate Me – Nominee

=== 2006 ===
- Bailey's Woman Of The Year Award – Won
- Best Live Act Award - Sole Festival – Won
- Award for Foreign Achievement - Sole Festival

Bay Music Awards

- Best Solo Artist – Won
- Best Single - Driving One Of Your Cars – Won
- Viewers' Choice Awards - Best Performance – Won

=== 2007 ===
Malta Music Awards

- Best Album - Accident Prone – Won
- Best Female Artist – Won
- Best Image – Nominee
- Best Video - Accident Prone' – Nominee
- Best Local Export' – Won
- Best Performance' – Nominee

Bay Music Awards

- Best Solo Artist' – Won

=== 2008 ===
Malta Music Awards

- Best Image' – Nominee
- Best Female Artist' – Won
- Best CD Cover' Fortune Teller – Nominee
- Best Album' Fortune Teller – Won
- Best Songwriter' – Nominee
- Best Song (Idle Motion) – Nominee

Bay Music Awards

- Best Solo Artist – Nominee
- Best Song (Idle Motion) – Won

=== 2009 ===
Bay Music Awards

- Best Dance Tune / Remix (What's The Matter With Your Cabrio? (DJ Ruby remix)) – Nominee

=== 2019 ===
Lovin Music Awards

- Best Solo Act — Winner
- Best Collaboration (Hey Now) (with Owen Leuellen) — Winner

=== 2020 ===
Malta Music Awards

- Best Song (Hey Now) — Nominee
- Best Video (High) — Nominee
- Best Solo Artist — Winner
