= Say Hey =

Say Hey may refer to:

== Sports ==
- Willie Mays (1931–2024), American baseball player, nicknamed “the Say Hey Kid”

== Music ==
- Say Hey Records, a 2003–2008 American record label
- "Say Hey (I Love You)", a song by Michael Franti & Spearhead featuring Cherine Anderson, 2008
- "Say Hey", a song by Ira Losco, 2004
- "Say Hey", a song by Kylie Minogue from Impossible Princess, 1997
- "Say Hey", a song by the Tubes from Love Bomb, 1985
