= Rip (Rest in Peace) =

2023 single by Aidan and Ira Losco

Single by Aidan and Ira Losco

from the album This Is Aidan
- Released: 1 January 2023
- Recorded: 2022
- Genre: Pop
- Length: 2:58
- Songwriters: Aidan Cassar; Boban Apostolov; Ira Losco
- Producer: Boban Apostolov

Aidan singles chronology
"Madam" (2022)	"Rip (Rest in Peace)" (2023)	"Reġina" (2023)

Ira Losco singles chronology
"Going For Gold" (2022)	"Rip (Rest in Peace)" (2023)	"Illejla (Hey Now, Maltese Version)" (2023)

Music video
- "Rip (Rest in Peace)" on YouTube

"Rip (Rest in Peace)" (stylised in all uppercase) is a song by Maltese singers Aidan and Ira Losco released on 1 January 2023. The song was produced by Boban Apostolov and peaked at number one on Malta's singles charts.

== Background and release ==
Aidan marked his 23rd birthday by announcing a new single with Ira Losco on 17 December 2023. He stated that he was "honoured to be starting the new year with a new single with one of [his] favourite local stars" and that they had been working on the single since mid-summer. Additionally, prior to the release Aidan's song "Ritmu" won an award for Best Song of the Year.

"Rip (Rest in Peace)" was produced by Boban Apostolov and was featured in Aidan's debut album This Is Aidan released in March 2023.

== Critical reception ==
The song peaked at number one in Malta's singles charts on 22 January 2023. Culture Fix described the song as a "slinky Mediterranean inspired pop melody" and praised the singers vocal abilities. Jonathan Vautrey of Wiwibloggs called it as a "solid pop track with a repetitive chorus".

== Music video ==
The music video was produced by Gravity Studios and released on 1 January 2023. Malta Daily described the video as having "sleek, modern visuals and clean cinematography."

== Charts ==
Chart performance for "Rip (Rest in Peace)"
Chart (2023)	Peak position
Malta Domestic Airplay (BMAT PRS)	1

== See also ==
- List of number-one singles of the 2020s (Malta)
