= Accident Prone =

Accident Prone may refer to:

- Accident Prone (album), a 2005 album by Ira Losco
- "Accident Prone" (song), a 1978 single released by the British rock band Status Quo
- "Accident Prone", a 1995 song by Jawbreaker from Dear You
- Accident-proneness
