= Naħseb Fik =

2021 single by Aidan

Single by Aidan

from the album This Is Aidan
- Language: Maltese
- Released: 19 March 2021
- Genre: Pop
- Length: 2:59
- Label: WickedandLoud
- Songwriters: Aidan Cassar; Boban Apostolov
- Producer: Boban Apostolov

Aidan singles chronology
"Heart Emoji" (2021)	"Naħseb Fik" (2021)	"24/7" (2021)

Music video
- "Naħseb Fik" on YouTube

"Naħseb Fik" (Note: Stylised in all uppercase.) (Maltese pronunciation: [ˈnɐħsɛp ˈfiːk]; transl. "I Think of You") is a song by Maltese singer Aidan released on 19 March 2021. It was his first song written in the Maltese language and was produced by Boban Apostolov.

"Naħseb Fik" received positive reviews upon its release and reached number one on Malta's singles charts. The song was praised for its catchiness and for being a rare example of a pop song in the country written entirely in Maltese, though the song received criticism due to allegations of plagiarism. It was included in the singer's 2023 debut album This Is Aidan.

== Background and release ==
The song is about a developing relationship that is taking root and was produced by Macedonian musician Boban Apostolov who Aidan stated "knows the industry very well". Aidan premiered it at the 2021 edition of Malta's national song festival Mużika Mużika. The song was written in Maltese as he said the country did not have a "radio pop hit" in the language. He stated in an interview that he had not performed or written in Maltese before and that the festival "seemed like the right time to give it a shot". He succeeded to the final of the competition before being eliminated, saying he "really did not expect" the song to be well received and the numerous videos on TikTok featuring the song.

In May 2021, he released an acoustic version of the song with Amber and the Palace String Orchestra. "Naħseb Fik" was featured in his debut album This Is Aidan released in March 2023.

== Critical reception ==
Television Malta reported that the "modern style and summery rhythm" was well received by Maltese people and played frequently on local radio stations. Malta Daily attributed its success to its "catchy Mediterranean vibe and beautiful use of the Maltese language". The song reached number one on Malta's singles chart and became the most popular Maltese song on Apple Music, iTunes and Spotify. Johnathan Cilia of Lovin Malta praised the song's reggaeton beat and orchestral elements but said the song became popular due to its "memorable tune and catchy lyrics". Jean Paul Azzopardi of Lovin Malta said that the song added to the "diversity of the local music scene" as unlike other Maltese pop songs it was sung entirely in Maltese.

=== Controversy ===
In May 2021, a video which simultaneously played "Naħseb Fik" and "Tick Tock" by English musicians Clean Bandit and Mabel went viral. The video noted that the songs had similar beats and chord progression with several parts of both songs lining up at the same time. Following its release, several Maltese musicians accused Aidan of plagiarism. Mario Vella, who had initially praised the song, said that the allegations against the singer were "plain and grievous". Wayne Camilleri said that he was disappointed as he thought the song was a "catchy innovative composition". Moira Stafrace agreed that it was disappointing as her daughter had informed her of the song and her initial reaction was "finally, a good popular song in Maltese".

Aidan denied the plagiarism allegations against him stating that in commercial music, "all current hit songs sound the same on radio". He stated that in order to keep up with "what's in or not" in pop music, he listens to hundreds of songs to get inspiration. He added that "music should unite, and this is exactly why this track is doing its rounds".

== Music video ==
The song's music video was released on 7 April 2021 and was filmed by Victor Abela and directed by Gary Bugeja. Most of the video was recorded in Marsaskala with the underwater segment being shot at the Malta Film Studios. Lovin Malta said that the music video embodied the song's "local spirit" as it featured scenes of Maltese culture and landscapes whilst the protagonist sings in his mother tongue. It received the best music video award at the 2021 Lovin Malta Social Media Awards.

== Charts ==
=== Weekly charts ===
Weekly chart performance for "Naħseb Fik"
Chart (2021)	Peak position
Malta Domestic Airplay (BMAT PRS)	1

=== Year-end charts ===
Year-end chart performance for "Naħseb Fik"
Chart (2025)	Peak position
Malta Domestic Airplay (BMAT PRS)	2

== See also ==
- List of number-one singles of the 2020s (Malta)
