= Dance (Our Own Party) =

2023 song by The Busker

Single by the Busker
- Language: English
- Released: 3 March 2023
- Genre: Funk
- Length: 2:49
- Songwriters: David Meilak; Jean Paul Borg; Matthew James Borg; Michael Joe Cini; Sean Meachen

The Busker singles chronology
"Miracle" (2022)	"Dance (Our Own Party)" (2023)	"Thinking About You" (2023)

Music video
- "Dance (Our Own Party)" on YouTube

Eurovision Song Contest 2023 entry
- Country: Malta
- Artist: The Busker
- Language: English
- Composers: David Meilak; Jean Paul Borg; Matthew James Borg; Michael Joe Cini; Sean Meachen
- Lyricist: David Meilak

Finals performance
- Semi-final result: 15th
- Semi-final points: 3

Entry chronology
- ◄ "I Am What I Am" (2022)
- "Loop" (2024) ►

Official performance video
- "Dance (Our Own Party)" (First Semi-Final) on YouTube

"Dance (Our Own Party)" is a song by Maltese indie pop band the Busker. The song represented Malta in the Eurovision Song Contest 2023 after winning Malta Eurovision Song Contest 2023, the Maltese national selection for that year's Eurovision Song Contest. The song peaked at number one in Malta.

== Background and release ==
The song is described as a storyline of someone who is triggered by social anxiety at a party and finding comfort in leaving with a couple of friends to go to a familiar and more comforting setting. In an interview with ESC Bubble, the band further described the song in general as "a journey of how one gets out of such a party, and heads back to their home with their friends to throw their own intimate party."

The song was made available for digital download and streaming on 3 March 2023. The music video was subsequently released on the Eurovision Song Contest's official YouTube channel on 9 March 2023.

== Eurovision Song Contest ==
=== Malta Eurovision Song Contest 2023 ===
Artists and composers were able to submit their entries between 17 October and 31 October 2022. Songwriters from any nationality were able to submit songs as long as the artist were Maltese or possessed Maltese citizenship. Artists were able to submit as many songs as they wished, however, they could only compete with one in the quarter-finals. The 40 songs selected to compete in the quarter-finals were announced on 21 November 2022.

"Dance (Our Own Party)" competed in the second quarter-final held on 20 January 2023. In each quarter-final, eight songs determined solely by the viewing public progressed to the semi-final. The semi-final took place on 9 February 2023 at the Malta Fairs and Conventions Centre in Ta' Qali. The Busker performed 18th and qualified to the final.

The final took place on 11 February 2023 at the Malta Fairs and Conventions Centre in Ta' Qali. After the votes from the jury panel and televote were combined, "Dance (Our Own Party)" was declared the winner of Malta Eurovision Song Contest 2023, placing second in the jury vote and first with the televote, becoming Malta's representative for the Eurovision Song Contest 2023.

=== At Eurovision ===
According to Eurovision rules, all nations with the exceptions of the host country and the "Big Five" (France, Germany, Italy, Spain and the United Kingdom) are required to qualify from one of two semi-finals in order to compete for the final; the top ten countries from each semi-final progress to the final. The European Broadcasting Union (EBU) split up the competing countries into six different pots based on voting patterns from previous contests, with countries with favourable voting histories put into the same pot. On 31 January 2023, an allocation draw was held, which placed each country into one of the two semi-finals, and determined which half of the show they would perform in. Malta was placed into the first semi-final, held on 9 May 2023, and performed second in the show. The song failed to qualify for the final, finishing 15th.

== Charts ==
=== Weekly charts ===
Weekly chart performance for "Dance (Our Own Party)"
Chart (2023)	Peak position
Malta Domestic Airplay (BMAT PRS)	1

=== Year-end charts ===
Year-end chart performance for "Dance (Our Own Party)"
Chart (2023)	Peak position
Malta Domestic Airplay (BMAT PRS)	1

== See also ==
- List of number-one singles of the 2020s (Malta)
