= The Busker =

Maltese music band

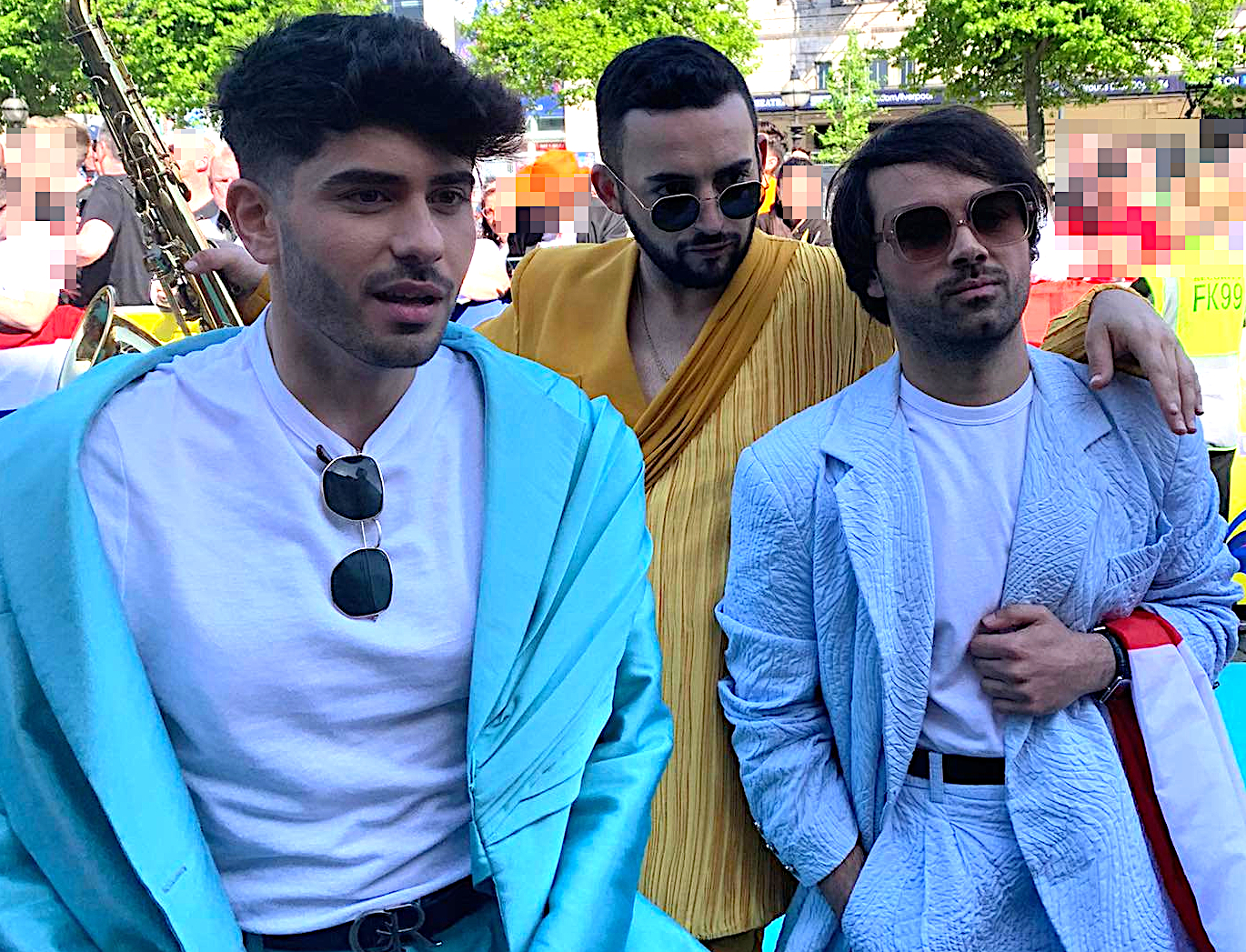
- The Busker at the Eurovision Turquoise Carpet in 2023; from left to right: Meilak, Meachen, and Borg

Background information
- Origin: Malta
- Genres: Indie pop; funk; folk; blues; rock
- Years active: 2012–present
- Members: David "Dav.Jr" Meilak; Jean Paul Borg; Sean Meachen
- Past members: Dario Genovese; David Grech

The Busker is a Maltese indie pop band founded in 2012, consisting of three members, namely David "Dav.Jr" Meilak (born 11 October 1994), Jean Paul Borg (born 27 August 1993), and Sean Meachen (born 19 November 1993). The band represented Malta in the Eurovision Song Contest 2023 with the song "Dance (Our Own Party)", which peaked at number one in their home country of Malta for 13 consecutive weeks and was the country's most played song of 2023.

== Career ==
The Busker was formed in October 2012 by singer and guitarist Dario Genovese and percussionist Jean Paul Borg. The band began by busking on the streets of Malta, hence the band's name. Not long after, they started posting covers and original music on YouTube. Two years later, bassist and keyboardist David Grech and saxophonist Sean Meachen joined. The group draws inspiration from 1960s pop bands such as The Beatles and The Beach Boys.

The band went on to release four extended plays, which led up to the launch of their debut album, Telegram, released in 2017. Another album was released the following year, entitled Ladies and Gentlemen, which won Best Album of the Year at the Lovin Music Awards. Genovese and Grech eventually left the group, and shortly after, Meilak joined the band as the lead singer and frontman. The band subsequently released their fifth extended play, X, on 1 September 2021.

In November 2022, The Busker was confirmed to be among the 40 participants in the Malta Eurovision Song Contest 2023, the festival used to select the Maltese representative in the annual Eurovision Song Contest. Their competing song, "Dance (Our Own Party)", was submitted the following month. After qualifying first from the quarter-finals and then the semi-finals of the Malta Eurovision Song Contest, on 11 February 2023, the band performed in the final, where they won with the combined support of the judging and televoting. Their victory granted them the right to represent Malta at the Eurovision Song Contest 2023 in Liverpool. They performed in the first semi-final, but did not qualify to the grand final. After Eurovision, the band went on to release two singles, both of which peaked at number two in Malta.

In June 2023, The Busker made a special appearance in Love Island Malta. Subsequently, the band performed at the opening ceremony of the 2023 UEFA European Under-19 Championship. On 18 July 2023, the band performed at Isle of MTV, which were co-headlined by OneRepublic and Alesso. On 15 September 2023, they performed at EuroPride held at Pjazza Tritoni in Valletta together with other Eurovision artists like Conchita Wurst, The Roop, and Katrina Leskanich from Katrina and the Waves. The band's released songs in 2023 were nominated for 88.7 Vibe End of the Year Hot 100 and 89.7 Bay Radio Best of 2023.

== Members ==
Current

- David "Dav.Jr" Meilak – lead vocals, guitars
- Jean Paul Borg – drums
- Sean Meachen – saxophone

Former

- Dario Genovese – vocals, guitar
- David Grech – bass

== Discography ==
=== Studio albums ===
List of studio albums, with selected details
Title	Details
Telegram	Released: 25 September 2017; Label: Self-released; Formats: Digital download, streaming
Ladies and Gentlemen	Released: 4 December 2018; Label: Self-released; Formats: Digital download, streaming

=== Extended plays ===
Title	Details
The Busker	Released: 2013; Label: Self-released
Greenwich Village	Released: 5 July 2013; Label: Self-released; Formats: Digital download, streaming
EP3	Released: 28 April 2014; Label: Self-released; Formats: Digital download, streaming
#FOUR	Released: 30 November 2014; Label: Self-released; Formats: Digital download, streaming
X	Released: 1 September 2021; Label: Self-released; Formats: Digital download, streaming

=== Singles ===
Title	Year	Peak chart positions	Album or EP
Title	Year	MLT Dom. Air.	Album or EP
"It's Alright (I've Got the Blues)"	2016	1	Telegram
"Away with You" (with Alexandra Alden)	2017	9	Telegram
"Surfin' Up"	2018	5	Ladies and Gentlemen
"Cadillac"	2018	3	Ladies and Gentlemen
"LWCTW"	2018	6	Ladies and Gentlemen
"Miles Away"	2018	3	Ladies and Gentlemen
"Just a Little Bit More" (with Matthew James)	2020	1	Non-album single
"Don't You Tell Me What to Feel" (with Raquela DG)	2021	2	X
"Loose"	2021	1	X
"Nothing More"	2021	—	Non-album singles
"Miracle"	2022	6	Non-album singles
"Dance (Our Own Party)"	2023	1	Non-album singles
"Thinking About You"	2023	2	Non-album singles
"Bulletproof"	2023	2	Non-album singles
"Talking Back"	2024	5	Non-album singles
"Something in My Head"	2025	—	Non-album singles
"My Oh My"	2025	7	Non-album singles
"Bored in the Supermarket"	2026	—	Non-album singles
"Un/Loveable"	2026	—	Non-album singles
"I Like Your Style"	2026	—	Non-album singles
"She Played My Mind"	2026	—	Non-album singles
"—" denotes a recording that did not chart or was not released in that territory.

== Awards and nominations ==
Award	Year	Category	Nominee(s)	Result	Ref.
Lovin Music Awards	2019	Best Album of the Year	"Ladies and Gentlemen"	Won	

Awards and achievements
Preceded by Emma Muscat with "I Am What I Am"	Malta in the Eurovision Song Contest; 2023	Succeeded by Sarah Bonnici with "Loop"
