= Stefan Galea =

Maltese singer (born 1996)

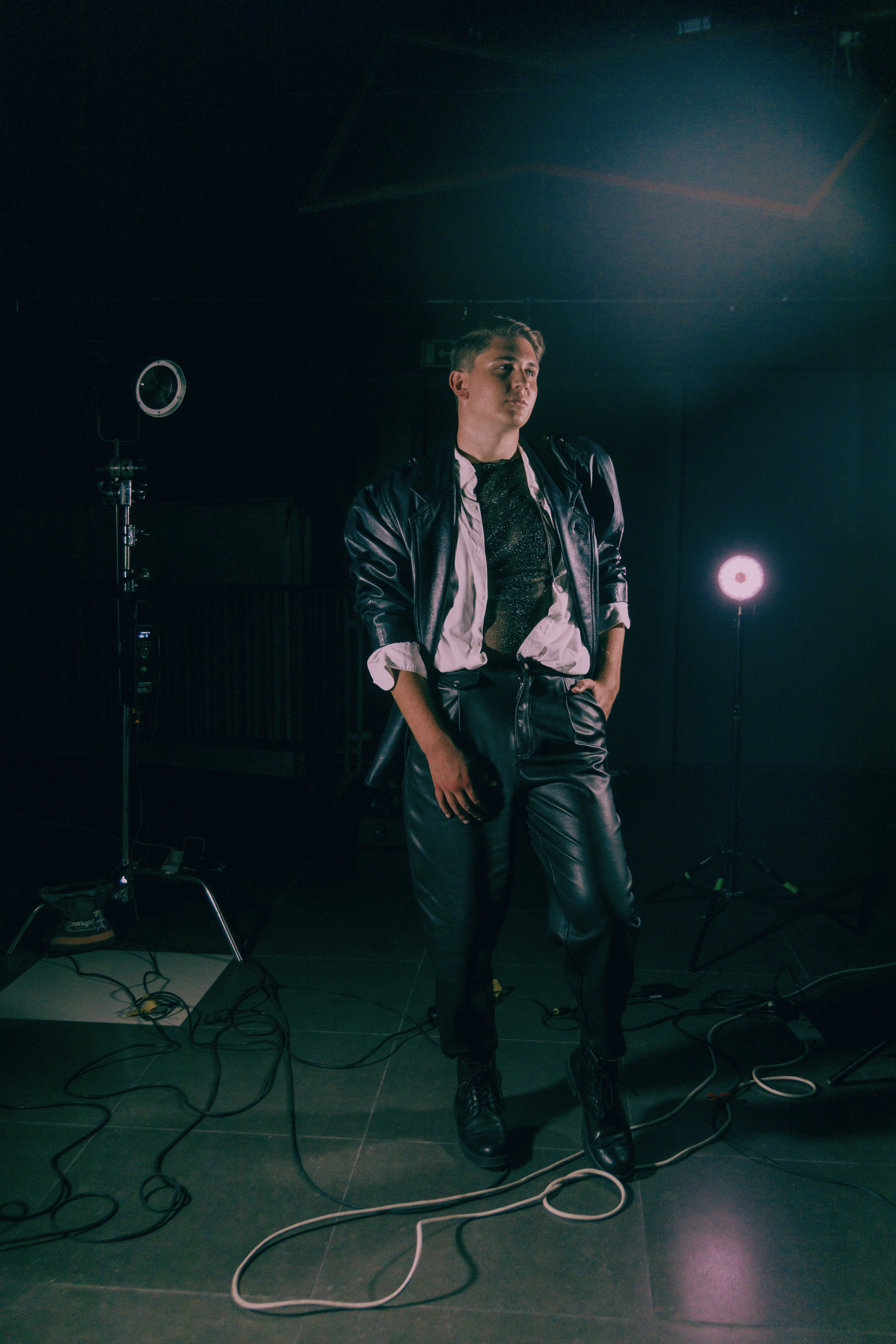

Background information
- Also known as: Stefan
- Born: Stefan Paul Galea; 28 March 1996 (age 30); Malta
- Genres: Pop, alternative
- Occupations: Singer, songwriter
- Instruments: Vocals, guitar
- Years active: 2005–present
- Label: Gilkicker Music
- Website: www.stefanofficial.com

Stefan Paul Galea (born 28 March 1996), also known mononymously as Stefan, is a Maltese singer and schoolteacher. He is a five-time contestant in the Maltese selection for the Eurovision Song Contest: participating in 2016, 2023, 2024, 2025 and 2026 respectively with his entries "Light Up My Life", "Heartbreaker", "Numb", "Lablab (Talk Talk)" and "Pose". He was also a contestant on the first season of X Factor Malta.

== Career ==
In 2009, Galea made it to the finals of Malta Junior Eurovision Song Contest 2009 with his entry "Shake Up Wake Up" written by himself and produced by Philip and Sean Vella. In January 2011, Galea's music was featured at the music industry trade fair Midem in Cannes, France, alongside several local artists such as Lyndsay, Explicit and Chris Grech (26 Other Worlds); Galea's song was produced by James Forrest and was presented to various labels and industry movers.

During this time, Galea collaborated with various artists including Malta Music Awards Best Hip Hop/RnB winner Dimal. He also was a support act for Ira Losco at her Music 4 Life concert in 2011, the UK's The Cheeky Girls, and also a Beatles tribute band.

Galea also took the stage to perform live with rock band Texanna at the Farsons Beer Festival accompanied by Andy Barnett from 1980s rock band FM, while also performing for the Italian ambassador Andrea Trabalza. He also formed part of the HSBC Joseph Calleja Choir between 2010–2012.

Galea's debut single "Disco Lemonade" written and produced by Charlie Mason and Crush Boys, charted at 12 on the Maltese iTunes Charts. Having also been a student at masquerade theatre and performing arts school for ten years, he took part in the MADC Christmas panto RapunzelStiltskin written by Steve Hili and directed by Steve Casaletto.

Galea has worked with Carlo Gerada and Matt "Muxu" Mercieca on his single "Escape" released in February 2015. The song also charted on the Malta Top 10 charts on 89.7 Bay and also on iTunes, and Galea also engaged in numerous gigs with his guitarist Kurt Aquilina.

In 2016, Galea was one of the participants in the Malta Eurovision Song Contest 2016, the Maltese national selection for the Eurovision Song Contest, with the song "Light Up My Life", written and composed by the Swedish sister duo Ylva and Linda Persson. In 2023, he participated in the Malta Eurovision Song Contest 2023 with the song "Heartbreaker", where he made it to the finals and got last place.

Galea returned for the Malta Eurovision Song Contest 2024 with the song "Numb", where he got eliminated in the third semi-final. In 2025, he participated in the Malta Eurovision Song Contest with the song "Lablab (Talk Talk)".

In 2026, he participated in the Malta Eurovision Song Contest for the fifth time with the song "Pose".

== Discography ==
=== Singles ===
- "Disco Lemonade" (2013)
- "Escape" (2015)
- "Light Up My Life" (2016)
- "Untrue" (2021)
- "Heartbreaker" (2023)
- "Numb" (2024)
- "Lablab (Talk Talk)" (2025)
- "Daisy" (2025)
- "Pose" (2026)

=== Charted Singles ===
Year	Title	Chart positions
Year	Title	iTunes singles Chart Malta
2013	"Disco Lemonade"	12
2015	"Escape"	1
2016	"Light Up My Life"	1

=== EPs ===
- My Evolution Vol 1
- Disclosed Affairs
