= Mixed Beats =

Remix album by Ira Losco
- Released: (Malta) 22 August 2009
- Recorded: 2008/09
- Genres: Dance; Trance; Electronica; House; Techno
- Producers: Ira Losco; Howard Keith; Alvin Gee; Miss Roberta; Glenn Frantz; Roger Shah; Duo Blank; Toby Farrugia; Joven Grech; Cyprian Cassar; Mark Grima; Matthew Agius

Ira Losco chronology
Fortune Teller (2008)	Mixed Beats (2009)	The Fire (2013)

Singles from Mixed Beats
- 1. "What's The Matter With Your Cabrio" Released: May 2009; 2. "Shoulders of Giants" Released: September 2009; 3. "Love Song" Released: December 2009; 4. "Something to Talk About" Released: February 2010

Mixed Beats is the second remix album by Ira Losco, the first one being Blends & Remixes of Someone Else.

== Track listing ==
1. "Something To Talk About" [U-Bahn Remix] – 3:57
2. "What's The Matter With Your Cabrio" [DJ Ruby Remix] – 5:27
3. "Love Song" [Tenishia Remix] - 4:47
4. "Your Ways" [Alvin Gee Remix] - 3.44
5. "Promises" [Miss Roberta Remix] - 5.03
6. "Idle Motion" [Toby Remix] - 4.31
7. "Accident Prone 2009" [DJ Ruby and Glenn Frantz Remix] - 4.55
8. "Shoulders Of Giants" [Roger Shah Magic Island Remix Radio Edit] - 4.30
9. "Driving One Of Your Cars" [DJ Ruby Remix] - 3.22
10. "Promises" [Duo Blank Remix] - 4.41
11. "Fortune Teller" [Glenn Frantz Reprise Remix] - 5.35
12. "Accident Prone 09" [Thomas Penton & Alex Armes Remix] - 5.21
13. "Shoulders Of Giants" [Roger Shah Magic Island Remix Club Mix] - 8.06
