= I Am Emma (EP) =

EP by Emma Muscat
- Released: 13 May 2022
- Length: 16:48
- Language: English
- Label: Warner Music Italy

Emma Muscat chronology
Moments Christmas Edition (2018)	I Am Emma (2022)

I Am Emma is the second EP by Maltese singer Emma Muscat. It was released on 13 May 2022 through Warner Music Italy.

The EP includes six songs from Muscat, among them both of her Eurovision Song Contest 2022 entries, "I Am What I Am" and "Out of Sight".

== Background ==
The EP was created after the creation of "I Am What I Am", a song about accepting one's self despite their flaws and inner demons. It is Muscat's second EP, after the release of her first EP in 2018, Moments.

== Track listing ==
I Am Emma track listing
No.	Title	Length
1.	"I Am What I Am"	3:02
2.	"Out of Sight"	3:03
3.	"Closer"	2:35
4.	"Thank You"	2:54
5.	"Turn Back Time"	2:27
6.	"Colors in the Dark"	2:47
