= Hey Now (Ira Losco song) =

2019 single by Ira Losco

Song by Ira Losco

from the album No Sinner No Saint
- Released: 21 June 2018
- Recorded: 2018
- Genre: Pop
- Length: 3:50
- Label: Jagged House
- Songwriter(s): Howard Keith; Ira Losco
- Producer(s): Howard Keith

Ira Losco chronology
| "One In A Million" (2018) | "Hey Now" (2018) | "Bad Habits" (2018) |

Music video
- "Hey Now" on YouTube

"Hey Now"

Single by Ira Losco featuring Owen Leuellen
- Released: 15 April 2019
- Recorded: 2019
- Genre: Pop; hip hop
- Length: 3:19
- Label: Jagged House
- Songwriter(s): Howard Keith; Ira Losco; Owen Leuellen
- Producer(s): Howard Keith

Ira Losco singles chronology
| "Walk on Water" (2016) | "Hey Now" (2019) | "Cannonball" (2019) |

Owen Leuellen singles chronology
| "Hey Now" (2019) | "My Time" (2020) |

Live performance
- "Hey Now" on YouTube

"Hey Now" (stylised in all uppercase) is a song by Maltese singer Ira Losco featuring Maltese rapper Owen Leuellen. It was first released in Losco's fifth studio album No Sinner No Saint (2018) before being released as a single featuring Leuellen in 2019. The song was number one on Malta's singles charts for sixteen weeks.

A version of the song in Maltese was released in April 2023 titled "Illejla" (Maltese pronunciation: [ɪˈlːɛːɪ̯lɐ]; transl. "Tonight").

== Background and release ==
The song was released in June 2018 as the fifth single from Losco's seventh studio album No Sinner No Saint, a double album produced by Howard Keith Debono.

Losco performed the song at the X Factor Malta season 1 finale with contestant Owen Leuellen on 26 January 2019. Losco had mentored Leuellen, a rapper from Valletta, in the final phase of the show and helped him to place second in the competition. According to TVMNews+, the duet was "welcomed by many fans" leading to Losco's manager Howard Keith Debono inviting them both to record the song together. In the same year, Losco would also collaborate with the winner of the first season Michela Pace on her next single "Cannonball" whilst Leuellen would later release his debut single "My Time" in March 2020.

== Critical reception ==
The song was number one on Malta's singles charts for six consecutive weeks between 7 December 2018 and 11 January 2019. The song reached number one again for another ten consecutive weeks between 22 February 2019 and 3 May 2019. David Grech Urpani of Lovin Malta described the song as having "dominating airwaves" for months in Malta after its release with Losco winning Best Female Artist, Best Pop Artist and Best Collaboration with Leuellen at the inaugural 2019 Lovin Malta Awards.

== Music video ==
The music video for "Hey Now" was released on 1 November 2018 and was directed by Steven Levi Vella. It was shot by Matthew Muscat Drago in the south of Malta.

The intro of the song includes the text "There are always two sides to every story" and Losco going to see a fortune teller. Losco stated that she plays a character "who's [sic] wedding plans didn't go as planned" and instead spends time at home, "taking her love for her plants a bit too seriously ;-)". Losco added that the character eventually moves on in her life and looks to depart her hometown. The fortune teller makes a reappearance at the end of the video which also features a preview of the music video for Losco's song "Bad Habits".

== Maltese version ==
"Illejla (Hey Now, Maltese Version)"

Single by Ira Losco
- Language: Maltese
- Released: 4 April 2023
- Genre: Pop
- Length: 3:52
- Label: Jagged House
- Songwriter(s): Howard Keith; Ira Losco
- Producer(s): Howard Keith

Ira Losco singles chronology
| "Rip (Rest in Peace)" (2023) | "Illejla (Hey Now, Maltese Version)" (2023) |

A Maltese language version of the song was released in April 2023 titled "Illejla" which translates as "tonight". Ruxandra Tudor of Wiwibloggs stated that the song "sounds fantastic in both languages" and described the Maltese version of the song as a "perfect summer radio song".

== Charts ==
Chart performance for "Hey Now"
| Chart (2018–2019) | Peak position |
|---|---|
| Malta Domestic Airplay (BMAT PRS) | 1 |
