= Unmasked (Ira Losco album) =

Studio album by Ira Losco
- Released: 6 December 2006
- Recorded: 2006
- Genre: Unplugged
- Length: 38:52
- Label: None
- Producer: Ira Losco; Howard Keith

Ira Losco chronology
Accident Prone (2005)	Unmasked (2006)	Fortune Teller (2008)

Singles from Unmasked
- 1. "Winter Day" Released: December 2006; 2. "Arms Of The Ones... ..." Released: March 2007

Ira Losco's first unplugged album (her third studio album) is Unmasked: the unplugged album. It was recorded in 2006, produced by Howard Keith (at Jagged House), and released on 6 December 2006. Unmasked includes various unplugged renditions of Losco's previous hit songs, unique arrangements of some 80s classics, and some new original material.

== Concept and idea ==
The idea for an unplugged album was born after Losco's supporting tour in Germany. The producer of the album, Howard Keith, said "Whilst touring her electric set in Germany Ira Losco had an opportunity of also doing 4 unplugged shows with Katie Melua who is now a multi platinum respected artist. The experience was very positive, and her set was so well received, that I thought it would be a great idea to record an unplugged album. I ran this thought by Ira, who loved the idea and we started working on it. The result speaks in volumes..." Losco said that "The whole concept was to allow the instruments and voice top take prominence in this record... I wanted to really explore my voice and its different tones... Lyrically I wanted to expose my true emotions.. vulnerability is truly beautiful through music."

== Songs ==
Unmasked includes special unplugged arrangements for some of Losco's previous songs, including the hit singles "Love Me Or Hate Me", "Accident Prone", and "Driving One Of Your Cars".

The album also features unplugged cover versions of some '80s classics, including Cyndi Lauper's "Time After Time", Soft Cell's "Bedsitter", and The Cure's "Love Song".

Two original songs are found in this album, which were both released as singles. The first was "Winter Day", which received positive reviews, and was a hit in the local radio airplay charts. The second single from Unmasked was "Arms of the Ones... ...", released in March 2007.

"The songs speak of the injustices in the world especially in times of war. It is an appeal and a wake-up call to those who by their actions and decisions cause conflicts over and over and thus affecting the lives of innocent people and children. Ira Losco claims to have been inspired to write the song after recently being in contact with War Child International, whom she is now supporting."

== Track listing ==
No	Title	Length
1	"Winter Day"	3:19
2	"Driving One Of Your Cars"	4:26
3	"Time After Time"	4:28
4	"Love Me Or Hate Me"	3:24
5	"Don't Wanna Talk About It"	4:34
6	"Accident Prone"	4:12
7	"Bedsitter"	3:28
8	"Love Song"	3:49
9	"Get Out!"	3:50
10	"Arms Of The Ones... ..."	3:22

== Charts ==
Chart (2006)	Peak position
Malta Album Sales Chart	1
