= Aidan (singer) =

Maltese singer-songwriter (born 1999)

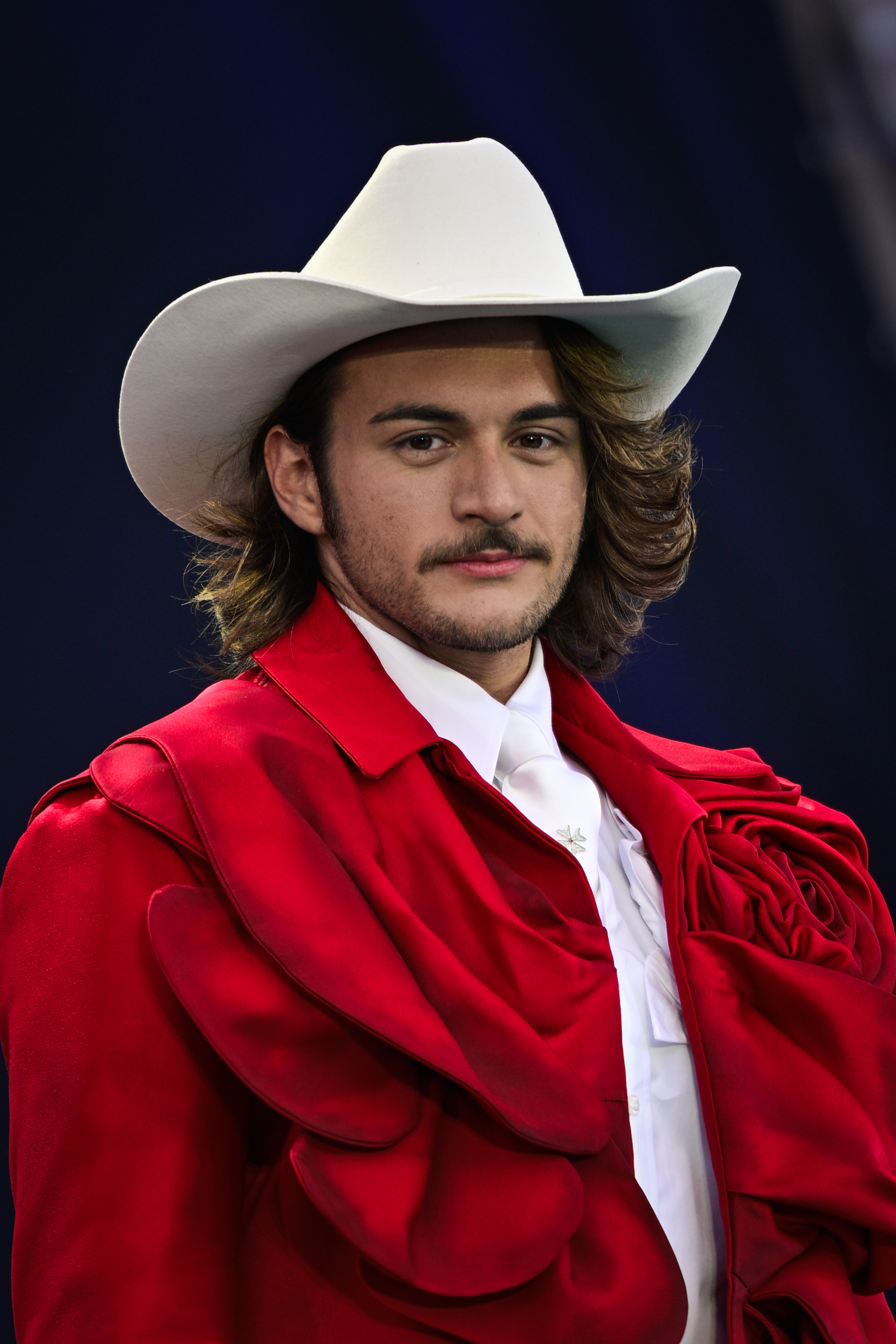
- Aidan in 2026

Background information
- Born: Aidan Cassar; 17 December 1999 (age 26); Żejtun, Malta
- Genres: Pop, Reggaeton
- Occupations: Singer; songwriter
- Years active: 2012–present
- Formerly of: Avenue Sky
- Website: aidanofficial.com

Aidan Cassar (Maltese pronunciation: [ˈɛɪ̯dɐn kɐˈsːɐːr]; born 17 December 1999), known mononymously as Aidan (stylized as AIDAN), is a Maltese singer and songwriter. He represented Malta in the Eurovision Song Contest 2026 with the song "Bella".

== Career ==
In 2015, Aidan competed in the Malta Junior Eurovision Song Contest. In 2018, he competed in the Malta Eurovision Song Contest with the song "Dai Laga". Following reports that the song, originally described as an original composition, had used a publicly available production beat and could have potentially violated Eurovision rules, it was revamped and re-released so it would not be disqualified. The song placed fourth in the contest. Afterwards, he participated in the X Factor Malta. In 2020 he wrote "Anywhere" for Leah Mifsud, which placed 2nd in Malta Junior Eurovision Song Contest that year.

His single "Naħseb Fik" has been compared to "Tick Tock" by Clean Bandit and Mabel and was said to have a similar chord progression. He denied the beat and melody were plagiarised. The song was entered into the Mużika Mużika song festival in 2021, it was the first time he has written a song in Maltese and performed in Maltese. The music video won music video of the year at Lovin Malta Social Media Awards in 2021.

He entered the Malta Eurovision Song Contest in 2022 with the song "Ritmu", placing second. The song went on to top the Maltese Radio airplay charts for three weeks, and Aidan was later invited to perform it at the London Eurovision Party. He was also the Maltese jury spokesperson at the Eurovision Song Contest 2022.

On 24 July 2022, he performed the songs "Naħseb Fik" and "Ritmu" during the Isle of MTV 2022 festival in Floriana.

In 2023, he entered the Malta Eurovision Song Contest again with the song "Reġina". He was disqualified from the contest allegedly due to social media posts about his song which were not allowed by Public Broadcasting Services (PBS). He threatened PBS with legal action but went on to perform a medley of his songs in the interval.

Aidan tried attempted to represent Malta again, by entering the Malta Eurovision Song Contest 2026 with the song "Bella" and won, which enabled him to represent Malta in the Eurovision Song Contest 2026. He placed 8th in the Second Semi-Final, thus qualifying and ended up placing 18th in the final with 89 points.

== Discography ==
=== Studio albums ===
List of studio albums
Title	Details
This Is Aidan	Released: 31 March 2023; Label: Self-published; Format: digital download
Cowboys Don't Cry	Released: 20 March 2026; Label: Self-published; Format: digital download

=== Extended plays ===
List of extended plays
Title	Details
Wild, Wild, Wild	Released: 7 March 2025; Label: Self-published; Format: digital download

=== Singles ===
List of singles as lead artist, with selected chart positions, showing year released and album name
Title	Year	Peak chart positions		Album or EP
Title	Year	MLT Air.	MLT Dom. Air.	Album or EP
"Rule the World"	2015	—	—	Non-album singles
"Bon Bon"	2017	—	—	Non-album singles
"Drums"	2017	—	—	Non-album singles
"Dai Laga"	2018	—	—	Non-album singles
"Mine"	2018	—	5	Non-album singles
"The Feeling"	2019	—	1	Non-album singles
"Somebody Like You"	2020	—	1	Non-album singles
"Heart Emoji"	2021	—	—	Non-album singles
"Naħseb Fik"	2021	—	1	This Is Aidan
"24/7" (with Carlo Gerarda)	2021	—	1	Non-album single
"Ritmu"	2022	—	1	This Is Aidan
"Madam"	2022	—	2	Non-album single
"Rip (Rest in Peace)" (with Ira Losco)	2023	—	1	This Is Aidan
"Reġina"	2023	—	2	This Is Aidan
"Head & Mind" (with Nabboo)	2023	—	1	Non-album single
"Juliette"	2024	—	1	Wild, Wild, Wild
"Hero"	2024	—	1	Wild, Wild, Wild
"Sorry"	2024	—	1	Wild, Wild, Wild
"2x2"	2025	—	2	Wild, Wild, Wild
"Taste"	2025	—	1	Cowboys Don't Cry
"Bella"	2026	1	1	Cowboys Don't Cry
"Cowboys Don't Cry"	2026	—	1	Cowboys Don't Cry
"Dolce Vita"	2026	—	1	Cowboys Don't Cry
"—" denotes a recording that did not chart or was not released in that territory.

=== Other charted songs ===
List of songs with selected chart positions, showing year released and album name
Title	Year	Peak chart positions	Album
Title	Year	MLT Dom. Air.	Album
"Pupa"	2023	1	This Is Aidan
"Strawberry"	2023	1	This Is Aidan
"Juliette" (a cappella version)	2024	9	Non-album single

Awards and achievements
Preceded by Miriana Conte with "Serving"	Malta in the Eurovision Song Contest; 2026	Succeeded by Incumbent
