= Jamaica Association of Composers Authors and Publishers Limited =

The Jamaica Association of Composers, Authors and Publishers (JACAP) is a Jamaican not-for-profit membership collective management organization which was established in 1998. JACAP administers the public performance and, if assigned also, the mechanical (reproductive) rights and synchronization rights of lyricists (authors), music composers and music publishers in Jamaica. JACAP is a member of the umbrella organisation for copyright societies CISAC - The International Confederation of Societies of Authors and Composers. JACAP is also a founding member of The Association of Caribbean Copyright Societies (ACCS).

== JACAP's structure ==
An elected board of directors, which includes a chairman, oversees JACAP's policy and administration on behalf of its members. In addition, the Board has external directors selected by PRS and the Government of Jamaica. The day-to-day affairs are handled by the general manager. The administrative personnel include the general manager, membership officer, distribution officer, accounts officer, licensing officers, membership clerk, distribution/documentation associate, and licensing inspectors.

== Categories of membership ==
JACAP's categories of membership are writer (composers and authors) and publishers, proprietors or successor members (beneficiary, personal representative or trustee of a deceased member). The heirs of deceased composers, authors and music publishers are also eligible for membership.

== Length of membership ==
Membership normally lasts for the member's lifetime. However, a member may, by giving three months prior written notice, terminate membership.

== JACAP's role in protecting their members ==
JACAP has reciprocal agreements with similar performing right societies throughout the world. By agreement with them, JACAP represents their members in its territory and is represented by them in theirs. JACAP looks after the performing right (and if the members agree also the mechanical/reproduction right) in their works. JACAP monitors public performances and broadcasts of music across Jamaica.

== Music licensing ==
A licence from JACAP allows users to access JACAP's repertoire. A JACAP licence is a legal requirement in Jamaica.

JACAP uses the BMAT digital monitoring system, which was introduced in 2013. The BMAT system monitors music usage of all media houses in Jamaica and keeps records of all musical works composed by JACAP members and affiliated societies.

== Distribution of royalties ==
JACAP collects license fees from music users and distributes the money as royalties to writers and publishers of music. Royalties are only paid on active repertoires, i.e. works that are actually used by the licensees (music users), and only to registered members of the society. Royalties are paid twice per year for the preceding year. After music users submit logs and playlists to JACAP, these are used to ascertain the rights owners in the works who are then compensated for the use of their creation through the fees collected. JACAP pays over royalties after administration expenses are deducted. To date, JACAP has paid out over $180 million to members

== International reciprocal agreements ==
JACAP has reciprocal agreements with its overseas affiliates and through these agreements represents over 2 million creators of music. JACAP members receive royalties for performances of their works that take place around the world, not just in Jamaica. JACAP maximizes the income of primary rights holders from licensing copyright works.

== JACAP annual report ==
Each year JACAP publishes and distributes its annual report in the form of a magazine to its members. This physical publication is primarily distributed to members at the yearly annual general meeting during the last quarter of each year.

== Membership statistics ==
As of 2015 JACAP has over 3400 members.

== Legal action ==
In 2015 JACAP filed lawsuits against several Jamaican media houses for breaches of the copyright laws. The media houses before the Supreme Court as of 2015 include CVM Television Limited, Nationwide News, News Talk 93 FM, Grove Broadcasting Limited (IRIE FM and ZIP 103 FM), KLAS Sports Radio, and Island Broadcasting Services Ltd.
