= I Am What I Am (Emma Muscat song) =

2022 song by Emma Muscat

Single by Emma Muscat

from the EP I Am Emma
- Language: English
- Released: 14 March 2022
- Length: 3:02
- Label: Warner Music Italy
- Songwriters: Dino Medanhodžić; Emma Muscat; Julie Aagaard; Stine Kinck

Music video
- "I Am What I Am" on YouTube

Eurovision Song Contest 2022 entry
- Country: Malta
- Artist: Emma Muscat
- Language: English
- Composers: Dino Medanhodžić; Emma Muscat; Julie Aagaard; Stine Kinck
- Lyricists: Dino Medanhodžić; Emma Muscat; Julie Aagaard; Stine Kinck

Finals performance
- Semi-final result: 16th
- Semi-final points: 47

Entry chronology
- ◄ "Je me casse" (2021)
- "Dance (Our Own Party)" (2023) ►

"I Am What I Am" is a 2022 song by Maltese singer Emma Muscat. The song was released on 14 March 2022, as a replacement for Muscat's previous entry for the Eurovision Song Contest 2022, "Out of Sight". The song represented Malta in the Eurovision Song Contest 2022 after Muscat won Malta Eurovision Song Contest 2022, Malta's national final.

== Release ==
The song was released on 14 March 2022, after heavy speculation that Muscat would change her song. According to the rules of the contest, the winner could send any song they wished, and could change it if they wanted to.

Swedish singer Dotter, fiancée of Dino Medanhodžić, one of the song's composers, provides backing vocals on the studio version of the song.

== Reception ==
the song was met with mixed critique by the fans, calling it pretentious and repetitive and more notably a big cliché of a girl coming from a very privileged, upper class background bringing an self-love empowerment anthem.

== Eurovision Song Contest ==
=== At Eurovision ===
According to Eurovision rules, all nations with the exceptions of the host country and the "Big Five" (France, Germany, Italy, Spain and the United Kingdom) are required to qualify from one of two semi-finals in order to compete for the final; the top ten countries from each semi-final progress to the final. The European Broadcasting Union (EBU) split up the competing countries into six different pots based on voting patterns from previous contests, with countries with favourable voting histories put into the same pot. On 25 January 2022, an allocation draw was held which placed each country into one of the two semi-finals, as well as which half of the show they would perform in. Malta was placed into the second semi-final, held on 12 May 2022, and performed sixth, in the first half of the show. it had finished 16th out of 18 in semi 2, with 27 points by the jury (12th) and 20 points by the televote (15th), making Muscat's entry the first ever NQ in both juries and televotes for Malta.

== Charts ==
Chart performance for "I Am What I Am"
Chart (2022)	Peak position
Malta Domestic Airplay (BMAT PRS)	1

== See also ==
- List of number-one singles of the 2020s (Malta)
