= Accident Prone (album) =

Studio album by Ira Losco
- Released: 16 November 2005
- Recorded: 2005
- Genre: Rock; Alternative rock; Indie
- Length: 47:29
- Label: None
- Producer: Ira Losco; Howard Keith

Ira Losco chronology
| Blends & Remixes of Someone Else (2005) | Accident Prone (2005) | Unmasked (2006) |

Singles from Accident Prone
- 1. "Everyday" Released: September 2005; 2. "Get Out!" Released: November 2005; 3. "Don't Wanna Talk About It" Released: January 2006; 4. "Driving One Of Your Cars" Released: April 2006; 5. "Accident Prone" Released: June 2006; 6. "Uh-Oh" Released: August 2006; 7. "Waking Up To The Light" Released: October 2006

Accident Prone is Ira Losco's second studio album, which was released on November 16, 2005. Howard Keith produced this album, which was recorded in 2005. To date, this album is the fans' favourite album. It was a number 1 hit in the local album sales charts, and seven tracks from it were released as singles. Losco's second album features "powerful guitars, edgy riffs and strong melodies".

== Album production ==
The production of Accident Prone started in April 2005 at the Farmhouse Studios (Siggiewi, Malta). Losco said, "I enjoyed writing this album so much. Howard and I worked on it for a month, then we were off on tour for three months, which really inspired us to write the last few tracks for the album. When we came back, we went into the studio and recorded the last four songs. Accident Prone is a real account of how our lives have been these last few months!"

This album is "versatile, strong and deep, revealing a more mature Ira Losco". Contribution for the production of Accident Prone came also from a series of co-writing sessions with American and Swedish songwriters.

== Touring ==
The first tracks of Accident Prone were recorded just before Losco started her summer 2005 tour in Germany. Performing for audiences ranging from 25,000 to 80,000, she was a supporting act for well-known artists like Elton John, Melanie C, Ronan Keating, Simple Minds, and Katie Melua. Losco said, "Touring has been an incredible experience. It has given me unbelievable confidence, a tough skin and an insatiable hunger for success! I also feel I’ve taken my performing and song-writing skills further throughout this busy summer!" Losco's band accompanied her throughout the tour. A video clip containing various footage of her tour was later posted on her site.

== Songs ==
Accident Prone features "strong and deep" songs. The first single from the album is "Everyday". Since her previous release in 2004, the release of this single boosted Losco's popularity in Malta, hitting number 1 in the local radio charts, and being featured in various local adverts. The second release was "Get Out!", a more up-tempo song. "Don't Wanna Talk About It" and "Driving One Of Your Cars" were also released as singles. The latter is a cover version of the original song by Lisa Miskovsky. In Malta, Losco's fourth single from Accident Prone was another huge success, topping the local radio airplay charts again. In June 2006, the album's title track "Accident Prone" was released as a single, together with a music video. The song is considered to be one of the favourites of Losco's fans. It received heavy radio requests and also topped the local radio charts. "Uh-Oh" was the sixth release from this album. This single was also accompanied by a music video release. The last single released from Accident Prone is "Waking Up To The Light", which is the most low-tempo, yet deeply strong song from the album.

== Track listing ==
| No | Title | Length |
|---|---|---|
| 1 | "Not Anymore" | 4:10 |
| 2 | "Everyday" ** | 3:54 |
| 3 | "You" | 3:29 |
| 4 | "Don't Wanna Talk About Ii" ** | 4:34 |
| 5 | "Uh-Oh" ** | 4:00 |
| 6 | "My Life" | 4:19 |
| 7 | "Ordinary Girl" | 3:16 |
| 8 | "Let It Go" | 4:09 |
| 9 | "Driving One Of Your Cars" ** | 3:56 |
| 10 | "Accident Prone" ** | 3:41 |
| 11 | "Waking Up To The Light" ** | 4:09 |
| 12 | "Get Out!" ** | 3:52 |

- (**) Released as singles

== Charts ==
Accident Prone spent a whole year in the Malta Album Sales Chart.

| Chart | Peak position |
|---|---|
| Malta Album Sales Chart | 1 |
