= Emma Muscat =

Maltese singer-songwriter and pianist (1999)

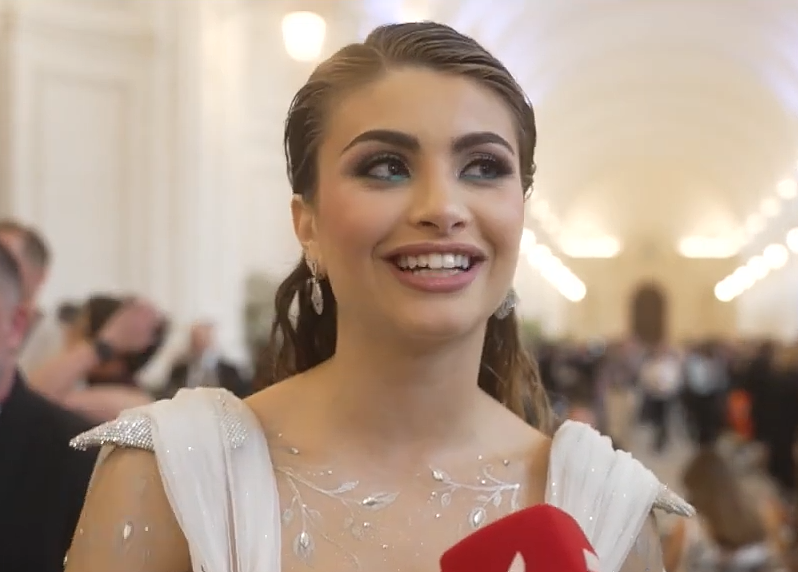
- Emma Muscat in 2022

Background information
- Born: Emma Louise Marie Muscat; 27 November 1999 (age 26); St. Julian's, Malta
- Genre: Pop
- Occupations: Singer; songwriter; pianist
- Years active: 2016–present
- Labels: Atlantic; Warner Music Italy
- Website: emmamuscatofficial.com

Emma Louise Marie Muscat (born 27 November 1999) is a Maltese singer-songwriter and pianist working in Italy. She represented Malta at the Eurovision Song Contest 2022 with the song "I Am What I Am".

== Early life and career ==
Muscat was born in Malta into a very wealthy family, and approached music from an early age. After compulsory education, she decided to enroll at the University of Performing Arts. As an adolescent she showed her skills in singing, dancing, and in the use of musical instruments: she specialized, in particular, with the piano, she is a classically trained pianist and also started to compose both the music and lyrics of her songs.

In 2016 she released her first single "Alone" on her YouTube channel and later in 2017 released her second single "Without You".

In 2018 she participated in the seventeenth edition of the talent show Amici di Maria De Filippi, managing to enter the "evening phase" (fase serale) where she was eliminated in the semi-final, finishing with fourth place in the singing category and a contract with Warner Music Italy. Following her experience at Amici, she participated in "Isle of MTV 2018" with Jason Derulo, Hailee Steinfeld and Sigala and then took part again the following year with Martin Garrix, Bebe Rexha and Ava Max. Later, at Joseph Calleja's yearly concert in Malta, she duetted with the Maltese tenor and Eros Ramazzotti. On 6 July she released her first EP titled Moments, which also featured the two singles previously released only on YouTube. The EP was anticipated by the single "I Need Somebody", released on 2 July. On 7 December the same year, she released her first studio album entitled Moments Christmas Edition with covers of many Christmas classics. On 16 November 2018 she had a duet with rapper Shade in the song Figurati noi.

On 26 April 2019 she released her first single Avec moi, featuring singer Biondo. On 14 November 2019 she participated in the remix of rapper Junior Cally's hit song "Sigarette". On 10 December she released the single "Vicolo Cieco"; after the release of the song, she stated in an interview that it would be the first official extract from her new album. On 3 July 2020 she released her summer single Sangria, with Italian rapper Astol, was certified gold in Italy and reached 28 million streams on YouTube.

=== Eurovision Song Contest ===
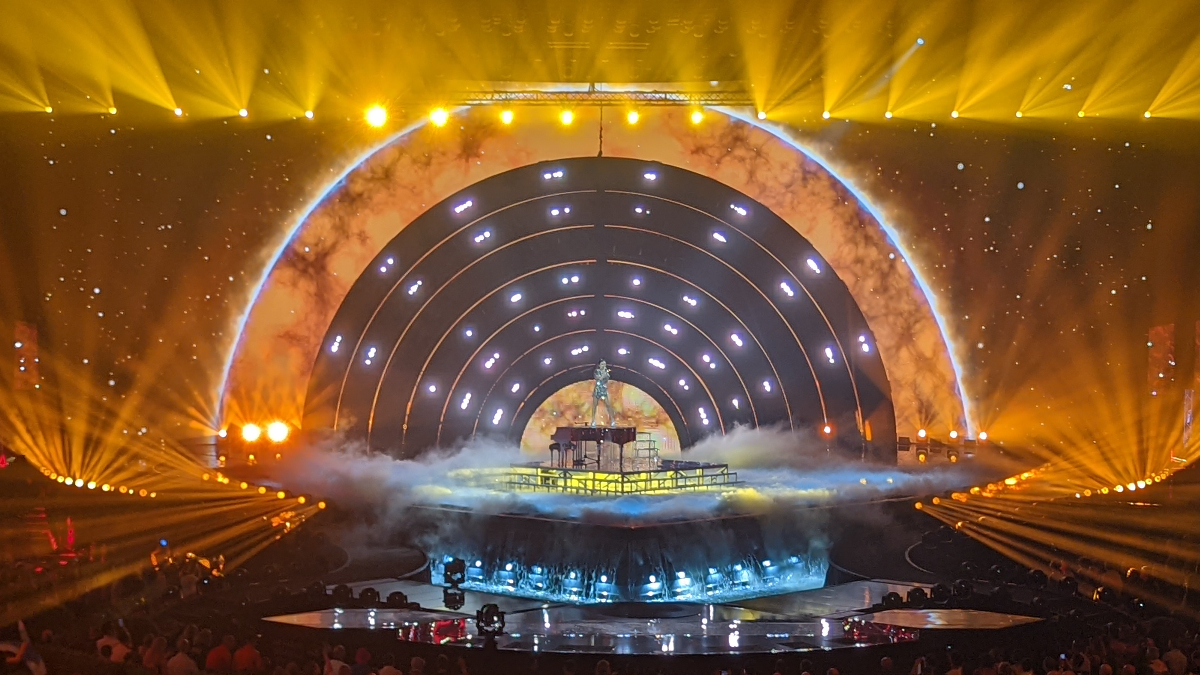
Muscat performing at the Eurovision Song Contest 2022

Muscat submitted a song to take part in the Malta Eurovision Song Contest 2022 in February 2022. The song "Out of Sight" won the contest with a total of 92 points, therefore gaining the right to represent her country at the Eurovision Song Contest 2022 in Turin, Italy. She won the jury's vote as well as the public's. Emma won 12 points from all six members of the Maltese national jury, as well as 20 votes from the public who voted by televoting. On 14 March 2022, a new song was released, titled "I Am What I Am", to replace "Out of Sight" as Muscat's Eurovision entry. I Am What I Am" was performed in the second semi-final of the contest on 12 May 2022, and failed to qualify for the final, finishing in 16th place as Malta's eighth non-qualification in the contest.

=== Post Eurovision ===
Muscat recorded songs with Spanish Eurovision 2021 artist Blas Cantó "La stessa lingua" and in 2023 she released a song with Italian DJ Benny Benassi titled "M.I.A." She was also the pre-show headliner for Latin popstar Maluma in Sicily.

== Discography ==
=== Studio albums ===
List of albums, with selected chart positions and certifications
Title	Album details	Peak chart positions
Title	Album details	ITA
Moments Christmas Edition	Released: 7 December 2018; Label: Warner Music Italy; Format: CD, digital download, streaming	47

=== Extended plays ===
List of EPs, with selected chart positions and certifications
Title	EP details	Peak chart positions
Title	EP details	ITA
Moments	Released: 6 July 2018; Label: Warner Music Italy; Format: CD, digital download, streaming	3
I Am Emma	Released: 13 May 2022; Label: Warner Music Italy; Format: CD, digital download, streaming	—

=== Singles ===
==== As lead artist ====
List of singles, with chart positions, album name and certifications
Single	Year	Peak chart positions			Certifications	Album or EP
Single	Year	MLT Dom. Air.	ITA	SMR Air.	Certifications	Album or EP
"I Need Somebody"	2018	—	—	—		Moments
"Avec Moi" (featuring Biondo)	2019	—	81	—		Non-album singles
"Vicolo Cieco"	2019	—	—	—		Non-album singles
"Sangria" (featuring Astol)	2020	3	58	—	FIMI: Gold	Non-album singles
"Meglio di sera" (featuring Álvaro de Luna & Astol)	2021	3	55	—	FIMI: Gold	Non-album singles
"Più di te"	2021	—	—	31		Non-album singles
"Out of Sight"	2022	—	—	—		I Am Emma
"I Am What I Am"	2022	1	—	—		I Am Emma
"La stessa lingua" (featuring Blas Cantó)	2022	—	—	—		Non-album singles
"M.I.A" (with Benny Benassi)	2023	—	—	—		Non-album singles
"—" denotes singles that did not chart or were not released.

==== As featured artist ====
List of singles, with chart positions, album name and certifications
Single	Year	Peak chart positions	Certifications	Album or EP
Single	Year	ITA	Certifications	Album or EP
"Figurati noi" (Shade featuring Emma Muscat)	2018	41		Truman
"Sigarette Remix" (Junior Cally featuring Emma Muscat)	2019	—		Non-album singles
"Ciao" (Twin Melody featuring Emma Muscat)	2022	—		Non-album singles
"—" denotes singles that did not chart or were not released.

Preceded by Destiny with "Je me casse"	Malta in the Eurovision Song Contest; 2022	Succeeded by The Busker with "Dance (Our Own Party)"
