= Fortune Teller (album) =

Studio album by Ira Losco
- Released: (Malta) June 11, 2008
- Recorded: 2007/08
- Genre: Rock; alternative; indie
- Length: 51:21 (standard 14-track edition)
- Label: None
- Producer: Ira Losco; Howard Keith

Ira Losco chronology
Unmasked (2006)	Fortune Teller (2008)	Mixed Beats (2009)

Singles from Fortune Teller
- 1. "Something To Talk About" Released: September 10, 2007; 2. "Don't Look Down" Released: December 2007; 3. "Idle Motion" Released: April 2008; 4. "Promises" Released: June 2008; 5. "Elvis Can You Hear Me?" Released: September 2008; 6. "Shoulders of Giants" Released: December 2008; 7. "What's The Matter With You?" Released: February 2009; 8. "Fortune Teller" Released: February 2009

Fortune Teller is the third studio album by Maltese recording artist Ira Losco. She began working on the album in summer 2007 and on 9 May 2008, announced its release date at a press conference was made by Losco. Fortune Teller was produced by Losco and Howard Keith (at Jagged House).

== Concept and style ==
Fortune Teller manifests a more mature Losco. Throughout the lyrics, it is more political and deep than her previous albums. The album was written with live performances in mind and is danceable and pumping. Losco's album is of an alternative style. It features "adamant views about everything and a raspy, leathery tone to her voice. Electric guitars and punchy synthesizers are prominent."

Losco stated that "there's a bit of reading-between-the-lines but than there is stuff that's right there in your face".

== Songs and single releases ==
In September 2007, the first single from this album was released, titled "Something To Talk About". The song was a hit in Malta, topping the local radio airplay charts. A performance was given by Losco at the Isle Of Mtv 2007 (Malta) later that year amongst other singers including Enrique Iglesias, Maroon 5 and Akon. The second single, "Don't Look Down", was released in December 2007. Both songs received positive reviews and became fast favourites with the local radio audience. Also, in December 2007, some tracks from the upcoming album were revealed on the Living It... DVD, including "Don't Look Down", "Idle Motion" and "Shoulders Of Giants".

In January 2008, a music video was released for the single 'Don't Look Down", and was made available for download on Losco's official website and 89.7 bay's website. The video received mixed reviews, as it is a mixture of various clips from several performances.

In March 2008, a single from Fortune Teller was released on all local radios. "Idle Motion", like the previous songs, topped the local radio airplay charts and can be played on Losco's official Myspace. A "making of" video for this single was aired on a local TV show.

The seventh single, "What's The Matter With You?", was released on 27 February on all local radio stations. A video for this single was released in June 2009, produced by No Sweat Productions, and received mostly positive comments.

The track "Gypsy Girl" was sampled by Beardyman in his track "Round the Clock Conclusions" on I Done A Album.

== Track listing ==
- Tracks 1, 2, 3, 4, 5, 7, 10, 11, 12, 13, and 14 written by Ira Losco and Howard Keith. Track 6 written by Ira Losco/Ray Mercieca/Howard Keith. Track 8 written by Ira Losco/Adam Bonello/Howard Keith. Track 9 written by Ira Losco/Howard Keith/Malcolm Pardon/Frederick Rinmann.

No.	Title	Length
1.	"Fortune Teller"	3:47
2.	"Something To Talk About"	3:54
3.	"What's the Matter with You?"	3:32
4.	"Idle Motion"	4:09
5.	"Elvis Can You Hear Me?"	4:04
6.	"Promises"	4:07
7.	"Shoulders of Giants"	4:06
8.	"Don't Look Down"	3:36
9.	"Losing Streak"	3:32
10.	"No More"	3:09
11.	"Universe"	4:10
12.	"Killing Time"	4:11
13.	"Your Ways"	3:57
14.	"Gipsy Girl"	3:07

== Awards ==
Fortune Teller was nominated for Best Album Cover and won the Best Album award at the Coca-Cola Music Awards 2008.

The track "Idle Motion" was nominated for the Best Song Category at the Coca-Cola Music Awards 2008, and won for the same category at the Bay Music Awards 2008.
