= Blends & Remixes of Someone Else =

Blends & Remixes Of Someone Else

Remix album by Ira Losco
- Released: January 2005
- Genre: Dance; Electronica; House; Techno; Indie
- Label: None

Ira Losco chronology
Someone Else (2004)	Blends & Remixes Of Someone Else (2005)	Accident Prone (2005)

Blends & Remixes Of Someone Else is Ira Losco's first remix album. It was released in January 2005. Produced by Bridge Productions, Blends & Remixes Of Someone Else is a collection of tracks from her previous album Someone Else remixed by top local DJs. "Local famous DJs which contributed to this album are REN-D, Simon Pisani, DJ Ruby, Duo Blank, Owen Jay, Miss Roberta, Toby, Hooligan and others".

== Track listing ==
No	Remixed Track	Contributing Artist
1	"Must've Been Good"	REN-D, Simon Pisani
2	"Who I Am"	Duo Blank
3	"Day By Day"	Joseph Armani
4	"Someone Else"	Leftplay
5	"Say Hey"	Toby
6	"So Alive"	Tsezar
7	"I'm In Love Again"	Miss Roberta, Glenn Frantz
8	"Day By Day"	Alvin Gee
9	"Someone Else"	Junior B
10	"Who I Am"	Spooky Monkey
11	"If You Say"	Duo Blank
12	"Day By Day"	Hooligan
13	"Love Me Or Hate Me"	DJ Ruby, Mark U-Bahn
14	"She"	Woody AKI, Owen Jay
