= The Travellers (Maltese band) =

Maltese musical band

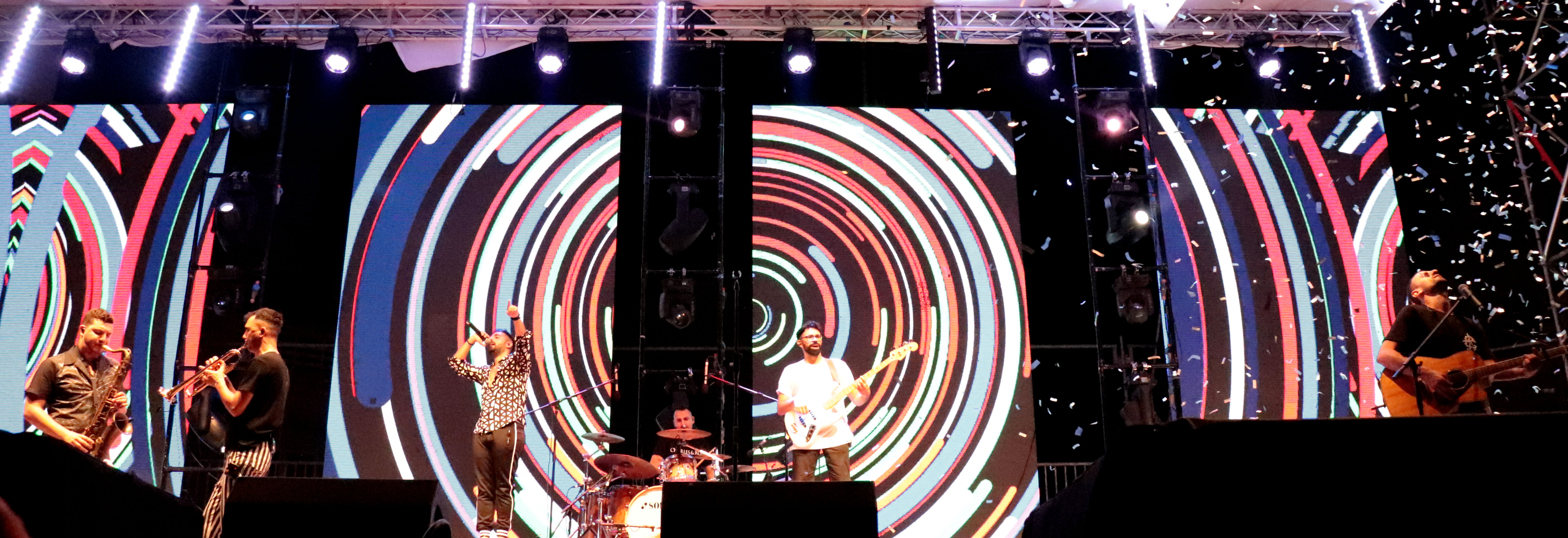
- The Travellers live at the Għaxaq Music festival in July 2022

Background information
- Origin: Gozo, Malta
- Genres: Pop music
- Years active: 2013–present
- Members: Clayton Bonello (bass guitar); Joseph Xerri (trumpet); Chris Gatt (vocals); Andrew Vella (guitar & backing vocals); Sylvano Mizzi (saxophone & keyboards); Michael Camilleri (drums)
- Website: www.thetravellersmalta.com

The Travellers are a music band from the Maltese island of Gozo. They released "Sempliċità" ("Simplicity"), their debut single, in January 2016. Their sound is characterized by Maltese lyrics accompanied by brass-based pop music.

== History ==
The band was formed in 2013 with the aim to create something different within the Maltese music scene. Clayton Bonello (bass guitar), Joseph Xerri (trumpet), Chris Gatt (main vocals), and Andrew Vella (guitar and backing vocals) were the original members. Sylvano Mizzi (saxophone and keyboards) and Micheal Camilleri (drums) joined later in the same year.

All members of the band come from the smaller Maltese island of Gozo. Just as other inhabitants of Gozo, they often have to take the boat to cross over to the main island. This was the inspiration for the band name. This is also referred to in their song "Il-Vjaġġatur" ("The Traveller") from their 2021 album Inżul u Tlajja'. Their debut single "Sempliċità" was a success and their two subsequent 2016 singles both topped the Maltese charts.

== Lyrics ==
All the songs released by The Travellers are in Maltese.

In 2018, The Travellers released the song "Ilkoll Flimkien" ("All Together"). The lyrics include excerpts from the poem "Jekk" ("If") by the poet Oliver Friggieri.

Some of their songs focus on current affairs or social issues. In fact, The Travellers have collaborated with various local entities to create awareness about various issues. With their song "Il-Biża'" ("The Fear"), The Travellers collaborated with Richmond Foundation, an organization that offers support related to mental health. The ending of the music video for the song lists contact information for ways to receive mental health support. With their song "Siġġu Vojt" ("Empty Chair"), The Travellers collaborated with Transport Malta for the 2021 campaign against drinking and driving over the Christmas and New Year period.

== Discography ==
=== Singles ===
Inżul u Tlajja' album in CD format

The Travellers have released several singles, each with its own music video. Most of these singles are included in an EP or album. The Christmas tracks "X'inhu L-Milied Għalik" and "Tridx Tkun Tiegħi Dan Il-Milied" as well as the 2025 tracks "Dawn Il-Widien" and "Ġmiel" were stand-alone releases.

- Sempliċità (2016)
- Dak li Int (2016)
- Xemx u Xita (2016)
- Ħafi Paċi Kuluri (2017)
- Ilkoll Flimkien (2018)
- Tpenġijiet (2018)
- Umani (2018)
- Iljuni fis-Silġ (2019)
- X'inhu L-Milied Għalik? (2020)
- Il-Biża' (2021)
- Inżul U Tlajja' (2021)
- Siġġu Vojt (2021)
- Ħobbni Kemm Trid (2022)
- Fejn Mar Il-Kwiet (2022)
- Is-Sbuħija ta’ Dan iż-Żmien (2022)
- L-Imħabba Kelma Kbira Wisq, featuring Ira Losco (2023)
- Tridx Tkun Tiegħi Dan Il-Milied, featuring Ira Losco, Gianluca, and Michela (2023)
- Dawn Il-Widien (2025)
- Ġmiel (2025)

=== Albums ===
The Travellers have released one EP and two full albums.

- Xemx U Xita - EP (2016)
- Iljuni Fis-Silġ - Full Album (2018)
- Inżul U Tlajja' - Full Album (2021)

=== Remixes ===
- Is-Sbuħija ta’ Dan iż-Żmien (Carlo Gerada Remix) (2022)

== Notable collaborations ==
The Travellers have collaborated with Maltese band Red Electric in the creation of a series of concerts where members of the two bands perform as a single large band. During these concerts the setlists include songs from the discographies of both bands. Concerts were performed in 2019 and 2022. In 2019, the concert was called "1". In 2022, it was called "ONE" and part of the proceeds from this concert were donated to the McDonald House Charities Malta which is an organization that helps families in need.

In 2022, local DJ and producer Carlo Gerada produced the first official remix of any song by The Travellers. He produced a remix of the song "Is-Sbuħija ta’ Dan iż-Żmien".

In 2023, The Travellers released a new version of their song "L-Imħabba Kelma Kbira Wisq", featuring Ira Losco. Losco and the band had known each other for several years but this was their first collaboration. The music video for this song includes local personalities and showcases various types of love among family and partners, and that love does not depend on race, gender, or sexuality.

Also in 2023, The Travellers released their second Christmas track "Tridx Tkun Tiegħi Dan Il-Milied" which features Maltese singers Ira Losco, Gianluca Bezzina, and Michela Pace.

== Awards and accolades ==
Award	Awarding Body	Year	Additional information	Source
Palma tad-Deheb	San Lawrenz parish, Gozo	2016	Award given to acknowledge effort by young people within the musical sector	
Best Musical Act	Lovin Malta Social Media Awards	2019		
Best Performance of the Night	Lovin Music Awards	2019	The Travellers performed their songs "Umani", "Ersaq fil-Qrib", "Ħafi Paċi Kuluri", and "Xemx u Xita"	
Best Band	Lovin Music Awards	2019		
Best Live Act	Lovin Music Awards	2019		
Best Song	Lovin Music Awards	2019	Awarded for the song "Ersaq fil-Qrib"	
Best Song in Maltese	Malta Music Awards	2020	Awarded for the song "Iljuni fis-Silġ"	
Best Song	Malta Music Awards	2020	Awarded for the song "Iljuni fis-Silġ"	
Best Musical Act	Lovin Malta Social Media Awards	2020		
Best Group	Bay Music Awards	2020		
Best Musical Act	Lovin Malta Social Media Awards	2023		
