= NaBBoo =

Macedonian musician

NaBBoo Бобан Апостолов
- Also known as: NaBBoo
- Born: Boban Apostolov; 2 November 1984 (age 41); Yugoslavia (present-day North Macedonia)
- Origin: North Macedonia
- Genres: Electro, House, Pop, Dance-pop, Hip Hop, R&B, Pop-rock
- Occupations: Composer, Songwriter, Record producer,
- Instruments: Violin, Piano
- Years active: 1999 – present
- Website: www.nabboo.com

Boban Apostolov (Macedonian: Бобан Апостолов, born 2 November 1984), known as NaBBoo, is a Macedonian composer, songwriter, arranger and record producer.

== Biography ==
Boban Apostolov was born in 1984 in Yugoslavia. At the age of six, he began to play violin in the music school Ilija Nikolovski – Luj, continued his studies at the Music High school, Music Academy in Skopje and Berklee College of Music in Boston as Specialist Studio Production.

2009–2014 He was a part as production manager, Pro Tools and sound engineer in F.A.M.E'S Project – Orchestral Music Recording and Production company, specializing in Film, Television, Documentary, Video games, and Publishing.

Some of the projects he was involved in recording orchestral music for movies are: Hostel: Part III, Camus, Keryti, Zwart Water, Omaggio a Roma (casting Monica Bellucci), Ana Winter, Hostel 3, Marea de Arena, 2033, La Commanderie, Joseph et sa fille, Les colts de l'or noi, Sound of Noise, The Lost Medallion, and many more titles for productions like TF1, EMI Music, Universal, Canal+, National Geographic.

Boban is a founder of Loops Lab Media, Company specialized for creating professional Music Samples, Loops, Drum Kits, Construction Kits, and Stock Music

Since 2014, he is a member of the Recording Academy, which enables him to vote at the Grammy Awards.

== Discography ==
=== Singles ===
Year	Artist	Song
2014	Daniel Kajmakoski	"Lisja esenski"
2016	Kanita	"Don't Let Me Go"
2016	CORSON	"Je Respire Comme Tu Mens"
2017	CORSON	"La Fille De Copenhague"
2017	naBBoo ft. Misha MIller	"Feel You"
2017	ABBIE	"No One"
2017	naBBoo & Gon Haziri ft. Miceal	"Hurt You"
2017	Barbara Opsomer	"Cette Nuit La"
2018	Kanita	"They Said"
2018	CORSON	"Tomber Les Masques"
2018	Jeremie Clamme	"Animal"
2018	Poli Genova	"Perfect Love"
2018	Jenifer	"Notre Idylle"
2018	Kanita	"S'Jemi Ne"
2018	Chimène Badi	"Là Haut" (Destination Eurovision)
2019	Jenifer ft. Slimane	"Les choses simples"
2019	Kanita ft. Lindon	"Stranger"
2019	naBBoo ft. Eneli	"Out of My Mind"
2019	Alexis Roussiaux	"Pour Elle"
2019	M.Pokora	"Mama"
2019	Jeremie Clamme	"For Me"
2019	Jenifer ft. Kylie Minogue	"On Oublie le Reste"
2019	M.Pokora	"Tango Électrique"
2019	Kanita	"Ankth"
2019	Kanita	"Fllad"
2020	naBBoo	"Middle of the Night"
2020	Galoski	"Knocked me Down"
2020	Yon Idy	"Back Around"
2020	Poli Genova	"How we End Up"
2020	Alliel	"Ce Qui Nous Rend Fous"
2020	Paulette	"C'est Pas Moi, C'est Les Autres"
2020	Kanita	"Lonely"
2020	Poli Genova	"Last Night"
2021	Aidan	"Heart Emoji"
2021	Eneli	"Sin Ti"
2021	Stéphane	"Douleur je fuis"
2021	Aidan	"Naħseb Fik"
2021	Antoine Delie	"Peter Pan"
2021	Samanta	"Emnin Tem"
2021	Poli Genova	"No More"
2021	Antoine Delie ft.Chimène Badi	"Si je le dis"
2021	Samanta	"Cha Cha Cha"
2021	ECCO	"Emmène-Moi"
2021	Poli Genova	"NaNa"
2022	Samanta	"Jeta Ime"
2022	Aidan	"Ritmu"
2022	Stéphane	"Green Dream"
2022	Joseph Kamel	"Premier rendez-vous"
2022	Samanta	"Vaj"
2022	Samanta	"E Vogla"
2022	naBBoo ft. Vanesa Sono	"Slay Me"
2022	Oliver Dion	"Vraiment"
2022	Samanta	"Margarita"
2022	Joseph Kamel	"Vieux"
2023	Aidan and Ira Losco	"Rip (Rest in Peace)"
2023	Aidan	"Reġina"
