= BMAT Music Company =

Music company

BMAT
- Headquarters: Barcelona, Spain
- Products: Music indexing
- Website: www.bmat.com

BMAT (Barcelona Music and Audio Technologies) is a music company that indexes all music usage and ownership data. The company monitors and reports music usage globally across TVs, radios, venues and digital. The company provides 80 million identifications and 27 billion matches to CMOs, publishers, record labels, broadcasters and DSPs daily. BMAT monitors radio Airplay, RIM Charts and other charts.

JACAP (Jamaica Association of Composers Authors and Publishers Limited) uses the BMAT digital monitoring system, which was introduced in 2013. The BMAT system monitors music usage of all media houses in Jamaica and keeps records of all musical works composed by JACAP members and affiliated societies. BMAT is partner of Audible Magic, The Official South African Music Charts, IFPI (International Federation of the Phonographic Industry), RightsHub, The Indian Music Industry (IMI) and TagMix.

== Awards ==
BMAT won the Key Innovator award by the European Commission’s Innovation Radar, Best Music Detection algorithm 2018 & 2019 awards by MIREX, Midsize Enterprise of the year Barcelona 2019 award by the Spanish Chamber of Commerce and Entrepreneur XXI (EmprendedorXXI) award of the year 2009.
