= Spellbound =

Spellbound may refer to:

== Film and television ==
- Spellbound (1916 film), with Lois Meredith
- Spellbound (1941 film), directed by John Harlow
- Spellbound (1945 film), directed by Alfred Hitchcock
- Spellbound (1999 film), a Japanese film directed by Masato Harada
- Spellbound (2002 film), a documentary film about the National Spelling Bee
- Spellbound (2003 film), a television film starring Richard Ruccolo
- Spellbound (2004 film), a television film starring Maggie Lawson
- Spellbound (2007 film), a television film starring Lauren Bittner
- Spellbound (2011 film), a South Korean film starring Son Ye-jin and Lee Min-ki
- Spellbound (New Zealand TV series), a 2016 spelling competition television show
- Spellbound (2023 TV series), a television show starring Hailey Romain
- Spellbound (2024 film), an animated film directed by Vicky Jenson
- "Spellbound" (CSI), a 2006 episode of the American television series CSI: Crime Scene Investigation
- Spellbound (game show), a Sky One game show
- "Spellbound" (Lego Ninjago: Masters of Spinjitzu), a 2015 episode of Lego Ninjago: Masters of Spinjitzu

== Literature ==
- Spellbound (The Legend of the Ice People novel), a 2008 novel by Margit Sandemo
- Spellbound (Dale novel), a 2008 children's fantasy/magic novel by Anna Dale
- Spellbound (Green novel), a 2003 chick lit novel by Jane Green
- Spellbound, a 1988 young adult novel written by Christopher Pike
- Spellbound (Correia novel), a 2011 fantasy-noir novel written by Larry Correia
- "Candidate for a Pullet Surprise", a poem sometimes plagiarized as "Spellbound"

== Music ==
=== Artists ===
- The Spellbound, an electronic rock duo formed by Masayuki Nakano (formerly of Boom Boom Satellites), and Kobayashi Yusuke (of The Novembers)

=== Albums ===
- Spellbound (Clifford Jordan album), released in 1960
- Spellbound (Ahmed Abdul-Malik album), released in 1964
- "Spellbound", 1977 album by jazz-bassist Alphonso Johnson
- Spellbound (Tygers of Pan Tang album), released in 1981
- Spellbound (Joe Sample album), 1989 album by Joe Sample
- Spellbound (Paula Abdul album), released in 1991
- Spellbound (Split Enz album), released in 1997
- Spellbound (Ten album), released in 1999
- Spellbound, 2011 album by Jay-Jay Johanson
- Spellbound (Yngwie Malmsteen album), released 2012
- Spellbound (TVXQ album), released in 2014
- Spellbound, 2018 album by Sadist
- Spellbound, 2022 album by Judy Collins

=== Songs ===
- "Spellbound" (Siouxsie and the Banshees song), a 1981 song from their album Juju
- "Spellbound" (Ira Losco song), a 2001 song by Ira Losco
- "Spellbound" (Lacuna Coil song), a 2009 song from their album Shallow Life
- "Spellbound", a 1975 song by Split Enz from their album Mental Notes
- "Spellbound", a 1976 song by the Bar-Kays from their album Too Hot to Stop
- "Spellbound", a 1981 song by AC/DC from their album For Those About to Rock We Salute You
- "Spellbound (by the Devil)", a 1997 song by Dimmu Borgir from their album Enthrone Darkness Triumphant
- "Spellbound", a 2010 song by Emily Williams
- "Spellbound", a 2014 song by TVXQ
- "Spellbound", a 2020 song by Lovebites from their single "Golden Destination"
- "Spellbound", a K-Solo song, subject of a dispute with DMX
- "Spellbound", a song by Bladee from Gluee

== Video games ==
- Spellbound (video game), a 1985 ZX Spectrum/Commodore 64 computer game starring Magic Knight
- Spellbound (1984 video game), a ZX Spectrum game, unrelated to the above
- Spellbound!, a 1993 educational computer game
- Amiga CD32, a video game console codenamed “Spellbound”

== Other uses ==
- SpellBound (spell checker), a spell checker for Firefox
- Spellbound Entertainment, a German computer game development company, founded by Armin Gessert in 1994

== See also ==
- Spelbound, a gymnastics troupe who won Britain's Got Talent in 2010
