= Lana Coc-Kroft =

New Zealand actress and beauty contestant

Lana Coc-Kroft (born 1967) is a New Zealand actress and beauty pageant titleholder who was crowned Miss Universe New Zealand 1988 and represented her country at Miss Universe 1988.

Coc-Kroft began her television career appearing in Sale of the Century, and in 1991 on the New Zealand version of Wheel of Fortune as the co-host with Phillip Leishman, later Simon Barnett. She continued in this role until the show ended in 1996. In 1994 she fronted the extreme sports show On The Edge for five years, where she went diving with sharks, parachuting, caving and extreme rafting in New Zealand and around the world. During the late 1990s she hosted 91ZM breakfast radio with Marcus Lush, leaving in 2002. In 1999 she co-hosted "The Lipstick Lunch" on ZM, which was networked nationwide in 2000. The show did not rate well despite winning Top Non Breakfast Award at the New Zealand Radio Awards in 2002 and as a result the show was cancelled.

Over the next few years Coc-Kroft hosted a series of shows and documentaries including Can You Hackett, Make or Break, DIY Dads, On the Road, and Test the Nation. While filming Celebrity Treasure Island during April 2004 in Fiji, Coc-Kroft became very ill due to a coral cut, and was flown to Auckland City Hospital with potentially fatal Streptococcal toxic shock syndrome. She spent nine days in a coma and five weeks in critical care.

Coc-Kroft has appeared in various New Zealand television advertisements, including one in 2003 advertising to switch off the microwave as the clock consumes a large amount of power. She has been national ambassador and spokesperson for several high-profile campaigns including World Vision, Persil Dirt is Good, Healtheries, and the National Water competency programme.

From 1996 to 2005, Coc-Kroft was a host on the television show SportsCafe, and returned with the show in July 2008 for another season.

Regarding the 2005 celebrity drug case involving former rugby players Marc Ellis and Brent Todd (called Project Aqua by the police), as part of the case, Coc-Kroft was granted name suppression, which she later let lapse, and she went to the police to explain her relationship with the men involved, but was not charged.

In 2009, Coc-Kroft co-hosted the show Who Dares Wins with former SportsCafe presenter Marc Ellis.

== See also ==
- List of New Zealand television personalities
