= Leigh Hart =

New Zealand comedian, radio announcer

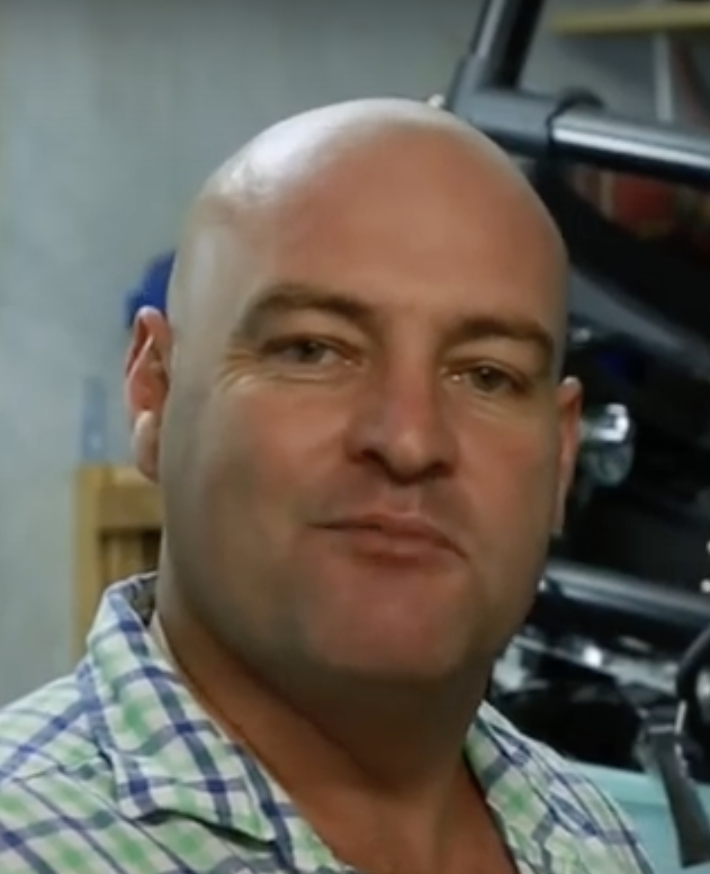
- Hart in 2015
- Born: Christopher Leigh Hart; July 20, 1970 (age 56); Greymouth, New Zealand
- Other name: That Guy

Comedy career
- Years active: 2001–present

Leigh Hart (born 20 July 1970) is a New Zealand comedian, radio announcer and performance artist who is also known as "That Guy". He has made various appearances on New Zealand television, including SportsCafe and his own show, Moon TV.

== Early life and education ==
Hart was born in Greymouth. He lived overseas with his family for ten years, including four years in Peru. His family returned to New Zealand when he was eleven. He attended Christ's College in Christchurch before spending a year at the University of Canterbury. After working on the Channel Tunnel for two-and-a-half years in the early 1990s, he returned to Christchurch and then founded the rock band "Wild Turkey" with his brother Greg and friend Matt Johnson. The band suspended activities in 1994 after being briefly jailed in France for visa irregularities and then deported. Returning to Christchurch, Hart enrolled in film and television school, where he began a satirical newspaper titled The Moon.

== Career ==
In the mid-1990s, Hart moved to Auckland and began working in television production for Greenstone Pictures. He was a writer on early episodes of The Zoo. In 1996, producer Marc Ellis recruited him for a vacant guest spot on a 1996 episode of SportsCafe, in which he appeared as an "international snail trainer." He was subsequently offered a weekly role as a sports interviewer and took on the nickname of "That Guy".

From 2002 to 2010, Hart produced and starred in Moon TV, a late night comedy show. The show parodied different television shows, and featured interviews with New Zealand celebrities. It was nominated for Best Comedy Programme at the 2005 New Zealand Screen Awards and the 2007 Air New Zealand Screen Awards. A spin-off show presented by Hart, Jason Hoyte and Jeremy Wells, Late Night Big Breakfast, ran from 2014 to 2016, and was revived for an additional season in 2020.

In 2010, Hart presented Leigh Hart's Mysterious Planet, which he described as an "epic TV disaster extravaganza". It was a mockumentary series in which he travelled the world attempting to solve the world's greatest mysteries including Bigfoot, the Loch Ness monster, UFOs, the Bermuda Triangle, lost Inca Gold, the pyramids and Stonehenge. Prior to the show airing, Hart wrote a humorous piece for the New Zealand Herald entitled "That Guy: Let's hear it for the Maori sasquatch", about his experiences attending a conference on Bigfoot. Hart later said that he had experienced criticism from attendees after the column was published: "Because it's all online they went nuts. They've been tearing me to bits and abusing me [since]. I'm public enemy number one."

In 2012 he presented Olympico, a three episode series with Jeremy Wells and Jason Hoyte which lampooned the London Olympics. In 2013 he presented an episode of the documentary show Descent from Disaster, in which he looked back at the Strongman Mine disaster in 1967 which shook New Zealand, particularly the West Coast, and interviews his friends and family who were directly affected. In 2017 he and collaborator Jason Hoyte co-hosted Screaming Reels, an unscripted fishing comedy show. It was mistakenly screened by the Seven Network in Australia as a documentary series.

On Radio Hauraki Hart and Hoyte hosted a drive-time show called Daily Bhuja, from 2015 to 2019. Hart also wrote a column for the Herald on Sunday from 2007 to 2011, and worked for the television show Fair Go.

In 2020, Hart appeared on the first season of the New Zealand series of Taskmaster. A review by The Spinoff said Hart was "the stand-out performer, largely because you can’t quite pin down what he’s thinking or what he’s going to do next".

== Wakachangi beer ==
In July 2013, Leigh released his own brand of beer, Wakachangi, brewed by Harrington's Breweries. It was initially marketed to students having big parties around the country (notably in Dunedin) and sold in 2-litre bottles. Wakachangi was released nationwide at all Liquorlands in 330ml bottles in October 2013. Hart said the beer had "hardly a true word on the label"; it is said to be "a South Otago beer, with North Canterbury flavours, brewed by a West Coaster, with the ol' misty waters of the Waikato - est circa 1648", and winner of the Moon Breweries beer awards.

== Appearances ==
=== Television series ===
- SportsCafe (screened 1996–2006 and 2008, starred 2001–2006 and 2008)
- Moon TV (2002–2010)
- The Great New Zealand Spelling Bee (2006)
- Shock Treatment (2006), with April Bruce (one episode)
- Pulp Sport (2007)
- That Guy's World Cup (2007) on TVNZ OnDemand
- Leigh Hart's Mysterious Planet (2010)
- Rugby Mundo (2011): a 12 episode comedic 2011 Rugby World Cup show.
- Olympico (2012) on Comedy Central NZ
- Descent from Disaster (2013) (one episode)
- 7 Days (2013–present)
- Late Night Big Breakfast (2014–2016) with Jason Hoyte and Jeremy Wells, on TV One (Season 1) and WatchMe (Season 2).
- The DNA Detectives (2015) on TV One (one episode)
- Rude Tube (2016) episode "Feasts of Fury", where his short "Fastest chef in the world 1" was ranked 16.
- Terry Teo (2016) on TV2 (one episode) as "Tom Hagar"
- Hamsterman from Amsterdam (2016) on WatchMe, a spinoff of the Moon TV character.
- Screaming Reels (2017)
- Taskmaster (2020)
- Jono and Ben at Ten.

=== Live appearances ===
Hart is a regular speaker and M.C. at public events. In 2011 in Shanghai, he helped raise nearly half a million dollars for the Christchurch earthquake relief fund.

=== Film ===
- You Move You Die (2007) as a police officer.
- Gary of the Pacific (2017) as a pilot.
- Scott's World of Cheese

=== Advertisements ===
- ANZ Bonus Bonds (screened 2006–present)
- Hellers Bacon (screened 2006–present)
- No 8 Rugby Internet Campaign
- National Mini Storage (2014–2018)
