= 2019 Northern Stars season =

Northern Stars season

Northern Stars
- 2019 season
- Head coach: Kiri Wills
- Asst. coach: Temepara Bailey
- Manager: Dee Leggat
- Captain: Leana de Bruin
- Main venue: Pulman Arena

Season results
- Wins–losses: 7–10
- Regular season: 3rd
- Finals placing: ANZ Premiership runners up
- Team colours

Northern Stars seasons
- ← 2018 2020 →

The 2019 Northern Stars season saw the Northern Stars netball team compete in the 2019 ANZ Premiership. With a team coached by Kiri Wills, captained by Leana de Bruin and featuring Temepara Bailey, Storm Purvis and Maia Wilson, Stars finished the regular season in third place behind Central Pulse and Southern Steel. In the elimination final, Stars defeated Steel 53–56. However, in the grand final, they lost 52–48 to Pulse, finishing the season in second place overall.

== Players ==
=== Player movements ===
Gains and losses
▲ Gains	▼ Losses
Temepara Bailey (retirement); Leana de Bruin (Adelaide Thunderbirds); Charlee Hodges (Adelaide Thunderbirds); Storm Purvis (Northern Mystics); Mila Reuelu-Buchanan (Central Pulse)	Ama Agbeze (London Pulse); Olivia Coughlan; Paula Griffin; Fa'amu Ioane (strained medial collateral ligament); Grace Kara (pregnancy); Christina Oscar (ACL injury)

=== 2019 roster ===
2019 Northern Stars roster
Players
Coaching staff

Nat.	Name	Position(s)	DoB	Height
(New Zealand)	Temepara Bailey	C, WA	23 October 1975 (aged 43)	1.69 m (5 ft 7 in)
(New Zealand)	Kate Burley	GK, GD, WD	23 April 1997 (aged 21)	1.81 m (5 ft 11 in)
(New Zealand)	Kayla Cullen	GD, WD, C	13 February 1992 (aged 27)	1.83 m (6 ft 0 in)
(New Zealand)	Leana de Bruin (c)	GD, GK	9 July 1977 (aged 41)	1.90 m (6 ft 3 in)
(New Zealand)	Holly Fowler	GD, WD, C	18 July 1997 (aged 21)	1.81 m (5 ft 11 in)
(New Zealand)	Ellen Halpenny	GA, GS	25 July 1990 (aged 28)	1.85 m (6 ft 1 in)
(Australia)	Charlee Hodges	GA, GS	14 September 1997 (aged 21)	1.80 m (5 ft 11 in)
(New Zealand)	Storm Purvis	GD, GK	20 April 1993 (aged 25)	1.86 m (6 ft 1 in)
(New Zealand)	Mila Reuelu-Buchanan	WA, C	11 May 1998 (aged 20)	1.72 m (5 ft 8 in)
(New Zealand)	Maia Wilson	GS, GA	21 September 1997 (aged 21)	1.87 m (6 ft 2 in)

Head coach

- (New Zealand) Kiri Wills

Assistant coach

- (New Zealand) Temepara Bailey

Manager: Dee Leggat
Performance Analyst:
Jessica Souchon
Physiotherapist:
Sharon Choie
Strength and conditioning:
Chloe McKenzie

Notes

- (c) – Captain
- (cc) – Co-captain
- (vc) – Vice-captain
- – Injury / maternity leave
- (TRP) – Temporary Replacement Player

== Pre-season ==
Northern Stars participated in the official ANZ Premiership pre-season tournament at Te Wānanga o Raukawa in Otaki on February 8–10.

Fri 8 Feb	Southern Steel	63–47	Northern Stars	Te Wānanga o Raukawa
4:00pm

Sat 9 Feb	Central Pulse	64–48	Northern Stars	Te Wānanga o Raukawa
11:00pm

Sun 10 Feb	Northern Stars	62–51	Waikato Bay of Plenty Magic	Te Wānanga o Raukawa
9:00am

== Regular season ==
=== Fixtures and results ===
Round 1

Sun 24 Feb	Southern Steel	64–66	Northern Stars	Claudelands Arena
2:10 pm	Lenize Potgieter 27/30 (90%); Te Paea Selby-Rickit 23/31 (74%); Jennifer O'Connell 14/15 (93%)	Report; Stats	Maia Wilson 51/57 (89%); Ellen Halpenny 14/16 (88%); Charlee Hodges 1/1 (100%)

Mon 25 Feb	Waikato Bay of Plenty Magic	57–51	Northern Stars	Claudelands Arena
7:40 pm	Abigail Latu-Meafou 34/37 (92%); Monica Falkner 23/27 (85%)	Report; Stats	Maia Wilson 35/41 (85%); Ellen Halpenny 10/14 (71%); Charlee Hodges 6/7 (86%)

Round 2

Wed 6 Mar	Northern Stars	65–46	Mainland Tactix	Pulman Arena
7:40 pm	Maia Wilson 51/55 (93%); Ellen Halpenny 14/18 (78%); Charlee Hodges 0/1 (0%)	Report; Stats	Ellie Bird 36/39 (92%); Brooke Leaver 5/6 (83%); Kate Beveridge 5/7 (71%)

Round 3

Wed 13 Mar	Northern Stars	55–49	Northern Mystics	Pulman Arena
7:40 pm	Maia Wilson 40/48 (83%); Ellen Halpenny 11/16 (69%); Charlee Hodges 4/6 (67%)	Report; Stats	Grace Nweke 27/33 (82%); Bailey Mes 10/17 (59%); Jamie Hume 8/17 (47%); Kristina Brice 4/6 (67%)

Round 4

Mon 18 Mar	Northern Stars	50–61	Central Pulse	Pulman Arena
7:40 pm	Maia Wilson 35/43 (81%); Ellen Halpenny 6/10 (60%); Charlee Hodges 9/12 (75%)	Report; Stats	Aliyah Dunn 43/45 (96%); Ameliaranne Ekenasio 17/25 (68%); Tiana Metuarau 1/2 (50%)

Round 5

Wed 27 Mar	Waikato Bay of Plenty Magic	47–57	Northern Stars	Trustpower Arena
7:40 pm	Monica Falkner 23/28 (82%); Kelsey McPhee 19/25 (76%); Abigail Latu-Meafou 5/7 (71%)	Report; Stats	Maia Wilson 36/41 (88%); Ellen Halpenny 21/23 (91%)

Round 6

Sun 31 Mar	Northern Mystics	50–64	Northern Stars	The Trusts Arena
4:10 pm	Grace Nweke 31/42 (74%); Bailey Mes 15/27 (56%); Jamie Hume 4/5 (80%)	Report; Stats	Maia Wilson 42/54 (78%); Ellen Halpenny 12/15 (80%); Charlee Hodges 10/11 (91%)

Wed 3 Apr	Central Pulse	68–42	Northern Stars	Te Rauparaha Arena
7:40 pm	Aliyah Dunn 38/41 (93%); Ameliaranne Ekenasio 30/34 (88%)	Report; Stats	Maia Wilson 29/36 (81%); Ellen Halpenny 10/12 (83%); Charlee Hodges 3/4 (75%)

Round 7

Mon 8 Apr	Northern Stars	42–53	Waikato Bay of Plenty Magic	Pulman Arena
7:40 pm	Maia Wilson 27/36 (75%); Charlee Hodges 13/16 (81%); Ellen Halpenny 2/5 (40%)	Report; Stats	Kelsey McPhee 38/45 (84%); Monica Falkner 15/16 (94%)

Round 8

Sun 14 Apr	Northern Stars	58–60	Southern Steel	Pulman Arena
4:10 pm	Maia Wilson 39/49 (80%); Charlee Hodges 19/24 (79%)	Report; Stats	Lenize Potgieter 22/24 (92%); Te Paea Selby-Rickit 21/27 (78%); Jennifer O'Connell 17/24 (71%)

Round 9

Tue 23 Apr	Mainland Tactix	49–46	Northern Stars	Horncastle Arena
7:40 pm	Ellie Bird 37/43 (86%); Kate Beveridge 12/15 (80%)	Report; Stats	Maia Wilson 19/26 (73%); Ellen Halpenny 18/21 (86%); Charlee Hodges 9/13 (69%)

Round 10

Sun 28 Apr	Northern Stars	53–52	Northern Mystics	Pulman Arena
4:10 pm	Maia Wilson 36/45 (80%); Ellen Halpenny 17/21 (81%)	Report; Stats	Grace Nweke 29/37 (78%); Bailey Mes 21/26 (81%); Jamie Hume 2/6 (33%)

Round 11

Sun 5 May	Mainland Tactix	53–48	Northern Stars	Stadium Southland
6:10 pm	Ellie Bird 47/53 (89%); Brooke Leaver 1/1 (100%); Kate Beveridge 1/3 (33%)	Report; Stats	Maia Wilson 37/43 (86%); Ellen Halpenny 11/17 (65%)

Round 12

Mon 13 May	Central Pulse	68–42	Northern Stars	TSB Bank Arena
7:40 pm	Aliyah Dunn 28/34 (82%); Ameliaranne Ekenasio 33/37 (89%); Tiana Metuarau 7/9 (78%)	Report; Stats	Maia Wilson 32/40 (80%); Charlee Hodges 7/12 (58%); Ellen Halpenny 3/10 (30%)

Round 13

Wed 22 May	Southern Steel	63–46	Northern Stars	Stadium Southland
7:40 pm	Lenize Potgieter 28/32 (88%); Jennifer O'Connell 18/22 (82%); Te Paea Selby-Rickit 17/23 (74%)	Report; Stats	Maia Wilson 33/43 (77%); Charlee Hodges 12/16 (75%); Ellen Halpenny 1/2 (50%)

=== Final standings ===
2019 ANZ Premiership ladder
Pos	Team	P	W	L	GF	GA	GD	G%	BP	Pts
1	Central Pulse	15	13	2	856	676	180	126.6	0	39
2	Southern Steel	15	12	3	946	809	137	116.9	2	38
3	Northern Stars	15	6	9	785	840	-55	93.5	3	21
4	Waikato Bay of Plenty Magic	15	5	10	713	793	-80	89.9	0	15
5	Mainland Tactix	15	5	10	740	849	-109	87.2	0	15
6	Northern Mystics	15	4	11	786	859	-73	91.5	2	14

Qualified for Grand final
Qualified for Elimination final

== Finals Series ==
=== Elimination final ===
Wed 29 May; 7.40pm	Report; Stats	Southern Steel	53–56	Northern Stars	Stadium Southland	Sky Sport
Wed 29 May; 7.40pm	Report; Stats	Scoring by quarter: 15–14, 30–27, 41–43, 53–56			Stadium Southland	Sky Sport
Wed 29 May; 7.40pm	Report; Stats	Lenize Potgieter 39/42 (93%); Te Paea Selby-Rickit 11/18 (61%); Jennifer O'Connell 3/5 (60%)		Maia Wilson 43/45 (96%); Charlee Hodges 13/18 (72%)	Stadium Southland	Sky Sport

=== Grand final ===
Mon 3 Jun; 2.00pm	Central Pulse	52–48	Northern Stars	Te Rauparaha Arena	Sky Sport
Mon 3 Jun; 2.00pm	Scoring by quarter: 12–10, 27–25, 40–34, 52–48			Te Rauparaha Arena	Sky Sport
Mon 3 Jun; 2.00pm	Aliyah Dunn 40/43 (93%); Ameliaranne Ekenasio 12/19 (63%)		Maia Wilson 34/41 (83%); Charlee Hodges 14/20 (70%)	Te Rauparaha Arena	Sky Sport
