= List of awards and nominations received by Stuff =

Stuff is a New Zealand news website. It has won numerous awards at New Zealand's Newspaper Publishers' Association awards (previously branded as the Qantas Media Awards and currently as the Voyager Media Awards) including Best News Website in 2014 and 2019, and Website of the Year in 2013 and 2018, Best News Website in 2019, and Digital News Provider of the Year in 2024 and 2025.

Year	Award	Recipient (if any)	Work	Result
2025	2025 Voyager Media Awards			
	Best photography - features	Chris Skelton		Winner
	Photographer of the year	Iain McGregor		Winner
	Digital news provider of the year	Stuff Digital		Winner
	Best investigation	Steve Kilgallon	The Darleen Tana Saga	Winner
	Best scoop	Steve Kilgallon	The Darleen Tana Saga	Winner
	Best specialist reporting	Sam Sherwood		Winner
	Cartoonist / animator of the year	Sharon Murdoch		Winner
	Political journalist of the year	Andrea Vance		Winner
	Editorial leader of the year	Keith Lynch		Winner
	Junior feature writer of the year	Maddy Croad		Winner
	Feature writer of the year	Charlie Mitchell		Winner
2024	2024 International News Media Association -Best Innovation in Newsroom Transformation		Best Practice - Consciously Uncoupling	Winner
	2024 Voyager Media Awards			
	Best photography - features	Chris Skelton		Winner
	Best photography - news	Iain McGregor		Winner
	Video Journalist of the year	Lawrence Smith		Winner
	Digital news provider of the year	Stuff		Winner
	Best Scoop	Andrea Vance	Kiri Allan ‘yelled and screamed’ at me, senior public servant says	Winner
	Sports journalist of the year	Mike White		Winner
	Business journalist of the year	Eloise Gibson		Winner
	Gordon McLauchlan journalism award	Mike White		Winner
	Local journalist of the year	Annemarie Quill		Winner
	Editorial leader of the year	Tracy Watkins		Winner
	Outstanding achievement ward	Martin van Beynen		
	2024 NZ Radio and Podcast Awards	Imogen Wells		
	Best Podcast Technical Production	Melody Thomas	The Good Sex Project	Finalist
	Best Podcast Producer or Producing Team	Michael Wright	The Trial	Finalist
	Best News & Current Affairs Podcast	Imogen Wells	Newsable	Finalist
	Best Health & Wellbeing Podcast	Melody Thomas	The Good Sex Project	Finalist
	Best True Crime Podcast	Michael Wright	The Trial	Winner
2023	2023 Voyager Media Awards			
	Photographer of the year	Chris Skelton		Winner
	Best photography - features	Chris Skelton		Winner
	Best photography - news	Chris Skelton		Winner
	Best photo-story/essay	Alan Gibson	Wallaby Plague	Winner
	Best documentary	Stuff with Paula Penfold, Toby Longbottom, Louisa Cleave and Phil Johnson	Fire and Fury	Winner
	Best feature video (single video journalist)	Chris Skelton	A child’s death, and a family’s nearly 40-year wait for ‘the truth’	Winner
	News app of the year	Stuff		Winner
	Best data journalism	Felippe Rodrigues		Winner
	Best editorial campaign or project	Stuff	The Whole Truth: Te Māramatanga	Winner
	Best student journalist	Katie Ham (Stuff and Capsule NZ)		Winner
	Best artist/graphic design	Kwok Yi Lee	Matariki 2022 front page; Budget 2022 front page; Money IQ March 2022 cover	Winner
	Business journalist of the year	Nikki Macdonald		Winner
	Community Journalist of the year	Caroline Williams		Winner
	Sports journalist of the year	Dana Johannsen		Winner
	Editorial leader the year	Janine Fenwick		Winner
	Best headline of hook	Carla Amos		Winner
	Best newspaper frontpage	Sunday Star-Times		Winner
	Best newspaper magazine	Sunday | Stuff		Winner
	Best columnist	Andrea Vance		Winner
	Best feature writing - general	Michelle Duff	Who is millionaire philanthropist Chloe Wright?	Winner
	Best feature writing - crime and justice	Mike White	Framed for Murder: The undercover operation that went too far.	Winner
	Regional newspaper of the year	Nelson Mail | Stuff		Winner
	Weekly newspaper of the year	The Weekend Press | Stuff		Winner
2022	2022 Digital Media Awards Asia			Winner
	Best Use of Online Video	Stuff Circuit	Disordered	Gold winner
	Best Podcast / Digital Audio Project	Popsock Media/Stuff	The Lake	Silver
	Best Special Project for COVID-19	Stuff	The Whole Truth: Covid-19 Vaccination	Gold winner
	2022 Global Media Awards			
	Best in Asia/Pacific		Switch On Your Superpower	Winner
	Best Idea to Encourage Reader Engagement		FY21 Impact Report	Honourable mention
	Best in Print		Harvey Norman — Boxing Day Delivery	Honourable mention
	Best Use of Video		This is how it ends	First place
			Deleted	Third place
	Best Use Audio		What's wrong with you?	Third place
	Best Subscription Niche Product		Now or never	Third place
	Best Idea to Grow Advertising Sales		Switch On Your Superpower	Second place
	Best Multi-Channel Client Advertising Campaign		Tipping point	Third place
	Best Use of Visual Journalism and Storytelling Tools		A Reconstruction of 20,000 Years of Earth’s Temperature (Or What We’re Doing to the Climate)	First place
			New Zealand’s COVID-19 Vaccination Roll-Out in Charts	Third place
	2022 Voyager Media Awards			
	Best coverage of a major new event	Stuff team	Delta Outbreak	Winner
	Best editorial campaign or project	NZ Herald/NZME & Stuff with Andrea Vance and Iain McGregor	The 90% Project & This Is How it Ends	Joint winner
	Best innovation in digital storytelling	Stuff Circuit/Stuff	Deleted	Winner
	Best team investigation	Stuff team	The Lake	Winner
	Best reporting - environment	Eloise Gibson		Winner
	Best reporting - lifestyle	Glenn McConnell		Winner
	Cartoonist of the year	Jeff Bell		Winner
	Best Feature Video (single video journalist)	Rosa Woods	The Whaanga Sisters	Winner
	Best podcast - narrative / serial	Popsock Media and Stuff	The Lake	Winner
	Video Journalist of the year	Ross Giblin		Winner
	Broadcast report of the year - current affairs	Paula Penfold		Winner
	Best photography - features	Chris Skelton		Winner
	Best photography - news	Ricky Wilson		Winner
	Best photography - sport	John Cowpland | Photosport, NZME, Stuff		Winner
	Best headline of hook	Richard Ives	Five slips and a gully	Winner
	Best newspaper front page	The Press	'We just need to get on with it'	Winner
	Metropolitan newspaper of the year	The Press/Stuff		Winner
	Voyager newspaper of the year	The Press/Stuff		Winner
	Best feature writing - general	Bess Manson, Dominion Post/Stuff		Winner
	Junior feature writer of the year	Pete McKenzie, North & South, Stuff, NZ Listener		Winner
	Reporter of the year	Kirsty Johnston		Winner
2021	2021 Global Media Awards			
	Best in Asia/Pacific		Ta Matou Pono, Our Truth	Winner
	Best Idea to Encourage Reader Engagement		Ta Matou Pono, Our Truth	First place
	Best Use of Audio		One hot minute	Third place
	Best Idea to Grow Advertising Sales		Finding new ground	Honourable mention
	2021 Voyager Media Awards			
	Best feature writing - social issues, including health and education	Florence Kerr	Tame Iti	Winner
	Editorial executive of the year	Carmen Parahi		Winner
	Best newspaper front page	The Press/Stuff		Winner
	Metropolitan newspaper of the year	The Press/Stuff		Winner
	Weekly newspaper of the year	The Weekend Press/Stuff		Winner
	Voyager newspaper of the year	The Weekend Press/Stuff		Winner
	Best photography - features, including portraits, fashion, food and architecture	David White		Winner
	Best photo-story/essay	Lawrence Smith		Winner
	Best photography - junior	Ricky Wilson		Winner
	Best editorial campaign or project		Our Truth: Tā Mātou Pono	Winner
	Best reporting - environment	Eloise Gibson		Winner
	Best reporting - travel	Lorna Thornber		Winner
	Science journalist of the year	Charlie Mitchell		Winner
	Reporter of the year	Alison Mau		Winner
	Best documentary / series	Stuff Circuit/Stuff Ltd		Winner
	Best feature video	Abigail Dougherty	The Mystery of Mrs Muir	Winner
	Video journalist of the year	Iain McGregor		Winner
	nib Health journalist scholarship - senior	Cecile Meier		Winner
2020	2020 Global Media Awards			
	Best in Asia/Pacific, Regional/Local Brands		Christchurch Mosque Shooting Coverage	Winner
	Best Public Relations or Community Service Campaign		Wasp Wipeout 2019	Honourable Mention
	Best Use of Video		Life & Limb	Second place
	Best Use of Audio		White Silence	Third place
	Best New Initiative to Empower and Retain Talent		All of Us: Creating a Workplace Fit for the Times, Fit for Everyone	Third place
	2020 Voyager Media Awards			
	Feature writing	Florence Kerr		Winner
	Best feature writer junior (no word limit)	Joel MacManus		Winner
	Best newspaper- inserted magazine	Sunday Star-Times/Stuff		Winner
	Best photography - features, including portraits, fashion, food and architecture	Braden Fastier, Nelson Mail/Stuff		Winner
	Best photography	George Heard, The Press/Stuff		Winner
	Judges' prize for the single best photo	Stacy Squires, The Press, Dominion Post, Sunday Star-Times/Stuff	A bloodstained survivor walking out of the police cordon	Winner
	Video journalist of the year	Lawrence Smith		Winner
	Best TV/Videao documentary	Stuff Circuit/Stuff and Māori Television		Winner
	Reporting - crime and justice	Blair Ensor, The Press/Stuff		Winner
	Regional journalist of the year	Hamish McNeilly, The Press/Stuff		Winner
	Sports journalist of the year	Dana Johannsen		Winner
	Best newspaper front page	The Press/Stuff		Winner
	Newspaper of the year (up to 30,000 circulation)	Waikato Times/Stuff		Winner
	Weekly newspaper of the year	Sunday Star-Times/Stuff		Winner
	Podcast - best narrative/serial	RNZ and Stuff	White Silence	Winner
2019	2019 Voyager Media Awards			
	Best News Website			Winner
	Editorial Executive of the Year	Patrick Crewdson		Winner
	Photographer of the Year	Chris Skelton		Joint winner
	Best feature/photographic essay	David White		Winner
	Best photography – portrait	Alden Williams		Winner
	Feature Writer of the Year (long-form)	Charlie Mitchell		Winner
	Sports Journalist of the Year	Dana Johannsen		Winner
	Best reporting – Maori Affairs	Tony Wall		Runner-up
	Reporter of the Year	Carmen Parahi		Runner-up
	Best Innovation in Digital Storytelling	Paula Penfold, Eugene Bingham, Toby Longbottom and Phil Johnson	Caught	Winner
	Best Team Investigation		Sex offender/motel investigations	Winner
	Best Editorial Project or Campaign		Made in New Zealand/Nā Niu Tīreni	Winner
	nib Health Journalism Scholarship – Junior	Hannah Martin		Winner
2019	Online Journalism Award: Breaking News, Large Newsroom		Christchurch Terror Attacks	Winner
2019	News Media Awards			
	Innovation of the Year		The Homicide Report	Winner
	Best Use of Mobile		New Zealand Made/Nā Niu Tīreni	Winner
	Daily News Brand of the Year			Finalist
2018	2018 Voyager Media Awards			
	Website of the Year			Joint winner
	Best Team Investigation	Phil Johnson, Paula Penfold, Eugene Bingham and Toby Longbottom	The Valley	Winner
	Reporter – Health, Education and/or General	Tony Wall		Winner
	Photographer of the Year	Iain McGregor		Winner
2017	2017 Voyager Media Awards			
	Best coverage of a major news event		Kaikoura earthquake	Joint winner
	Best Editorial Campaign or Project		#buythisbeachNZ	Winner
	Regional Journalist of the Year	Aaron Leaman (Stuff and Waikato Times)		Winner
	Reporter – arts and entertainment	Vicki Anderson (Stuff and The Press)		Winner
	Reporter – crime and justice	Eugene Bingham, Phil Johnson, Toby Longbottom and Paula Penfold		Winner
	Best news video	Ross Giblin		Winner
	Videographer of the Year	Ross Giblin		Winner
	nib Health Journalism Scholarship – Junior	Rachel Thomas		Winner
	nib Health Journalism Scholarship – Senior	Aaron Leaman (Stuff and Waikato Times)		Joint winner
2015	2015 Voyager Media Awards			
	Best Feature Photo	Chris Skelton		Winner
	Best Video	Asher Finlayson and Tony Wall (Stuff and Sunday Star-Times)		Winner
2014	2014 Voyager Media Awards			
	Best News Website			Winner
	Best Innovation in Multimedia Storytelling		Lost in the Long White Cloud	Winner
	Best Video	Mike Scott (Stuff and Waikato Times)		Winner
2013	2013 Voyager Media Awards			
	Website of the Year			Winner
2012	2012 Voyager Media Awards			
	Best Innovation in New Technologies		Stuff app	Winner
	Best Website Breaking News Coverage	Stuff and The Press		Winner
2012	Online Journalism Award: Planned News/Events, Medium Newsroom		12:51	Winner
2011	Pacific Area Newspaper Publishers' Association (PANPA) Awards			
	Best Niche Site/App		Rugby Heaven iPhone app	Winner
2009	Qantas Media Awards			
	Best Website Design			Winner
	Best Blog	Moata Tamaira		Winner
	Best Website Breaking News Story		Vote 08	Joint winner
	Best Website Breaking News Story	Waikato Times and Stuff	Tamahere fire	Joint finalist
	Best Single Website Report	Mark Stevens and David Hargreaves	Official cash rate announcement	Finalist
	Best Single Website Report	Michael Fox	Should you be afraid of sharks?	Finalist
2004	Qantas Media Awards			
	Best News Website			Finalist
