= Jason Hoyte =

New Zealand actor

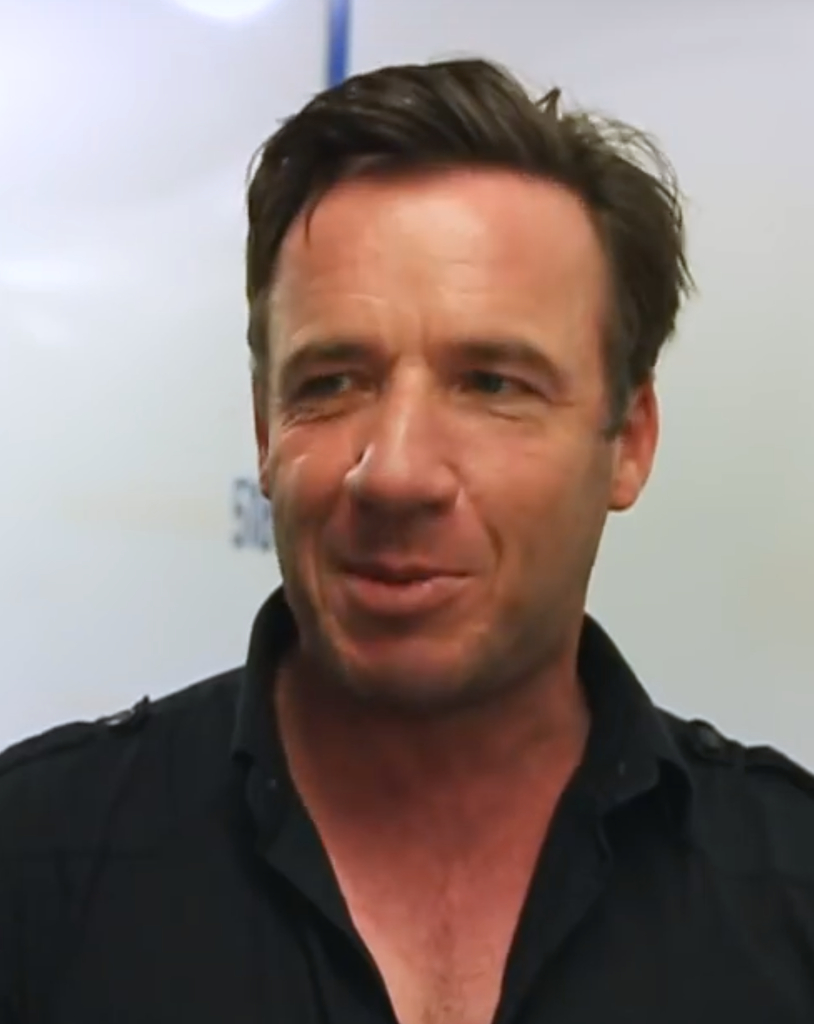
- Hoyte in 2016
- Born: Auckland, New Zealand
- Occupation: Actor
- Years active: 1996–present
- Children: 4

Jason Hoyte is a New Zealand screen and voice actor and radio DJ. Since 1996, Hoyte has acted in over 30 television shows including Xena: Warrior Princess, Young Hercules, Power Rangers Dino Thunder, and The Brokenwood Mysteries. He is known for playing Steve Mudgeway in Seven Periods with Mr Gormsby, Malcolm "Smudge" in Nothing Trivial, and Franklin Corke in the New Zealand Comedy/Drama Outrageous Fortune, as well as appearing in the comedy shows Moon TV and Late Night Big Breakfast with regular collaborator Leigh Hart.

Hoyte has also appeared in film, including We're Here To Help (2007), The Insatiable Moon (2010), Spies and Lies (2010), and What We Do in the Shadows (2014).

In addition to acting, Hoyte is also a radio DJ. He is currently one of the co-Hosts of the Radio Hauraki Big Show, along with Mike Minogue, and Chris Key.

== Early and personal life ==
Hoyte was born in Auckland, New Zealand. He moved to Rotorua as a young child, and lived with his father after his parents divorced. He was educated at Dilworth School, a boarding school he attended in the 1970s from the age of eight.

After completing school, Hoyte worked in various jobs including working for a podiatrist and canvassing for Greenpeace Aotearoa New Zealand. Hoyte initially began training as a teacher in the 1980s but didn't enjoy the strict environment. He briefly attended Auckland University, but dropped out before attending any lectures. However, in 2017, Hoyte received an honorary degree in radio broadcasting from the New Zealand School of Radio in Tauranga.

As of 2026, Hoyte has a wife and four daughters. He lives in the Bay of Plenty Region.

== Career ==
Hoyte began his career in stand-up comedy and won a Billy T. comedy award and a Chapman Tripp Theatre Awards as part of 90s comedy duo Sugar & Spice (alongside Jonathan Brugh).

Hoyte stated his first role was as an extra in an ad for "Burton’s Creamy Ale". After roles in Xena: Warrior Princess and Hercules: The Legendary Journeys he won acclaim for his portrayal of an untrustworthy, but politically correct guidance counsellor, Steve Mudgeway in the comedy Seven Periods with Mr Gormsby. He was nominated at the 2003 New Zealand Film Awards for his acting in short film Beautiful. In 2015 he starred in parody talk show Late Night Big Breakfast alongside Leigh Hart. In 2017 he and Hart produced parody fishing show Screaming Reels. The show was mistaken for an actual documentary in Australia. He has also narrated for New Zealand reality shows City Beat, Coastwatch, Dog Squad and Animal House.

Hoyte is a commentator for the Alternative Commentary Collective and was formally a host on Radio Hauraki's weekdays drive-time show 'Daily Bhuja', with co-host Leigh Hart, but finished 5 April 2019. He resumed this drive-time role in 2021 with new co-host Mike Minogue, the drive show now being called The Big Show.

In 2021 he starred in Talkback, a mocumentary web-series about a talkback radio host, which was also co-created by Minogue.

== Filmography ==
=== Television ===
Year	Title	Role	Notes
1996	Xena: Warrior Princess	Timus	"Warrior... Princess" (S01E15)
1996	Hercules: The Legendary Journeys	Scarred Lieutenant	"Let the Games Begin" (S02E16)
1997	Xena: Warrior Princess	Athenian #1	"The Price" (S02E20)
1997	Hercules: The Legendary Journeys	Skell	"Regrets... I've Had a Few" (S04E03)
1998	Young Hercules	Hephaestus	"Keeping Up with the Jasons" (S01E08) "Cyrano de Hercules" (S01E10) "Forgery" (S01E13) "Ares on Trial" (S01E15) "Down and Out in Academy Hills" (S01E16)
1999	Hercules: The Legendary Journeys	Hephaestus	"Love, Amazon Style" (S06E02)
2000	Xena: Warrior Princess	Hephaestus	"Looking Death in the Eye" (S05E19)
2002	Mataku	unknown	"Going to War" (S01E03)
2003	Power Rangers Ninja Storm	Copybot (voice)	"Beauty and the Beach" (S11E03)
2004	Power Rangers Dino Thunder	Donkeyvac (voice)	"Legacy of Power" (S12E04) "Back in Black" (S12E05) "Diva in Distress" (S12E06) "Game On" (S12E07) "Golden Boy" (S12E08)
2004	The Adventures of Massey Ferguson	Max Tractor, Rusty and Beaut the Ute (Voices)	
2005	Power Rangers S.P.D.	Valko (voice)	"Wired: Part 1" (S13E14) "Wired: Part 2" (S13E15)
2005	Power Rangers S.P.D.	Icthior (voice)	"Badge" (S13E33)
2005–2006	Seven Periods with Mr Gormsby	Steve Mudgeway	Main role
2005	Outrageous Fortune	Franklin "Corky" Corke	"Slings and Arrows" (S01E01) "The Cause of This Defect" (S01E04) "To Be Honest As This World Goes" (S01E12)
2006	Power Rangers Mystic Force	Fightoe (voice)	"Dark Wish: Part 1" (S14E18) "Dark Wish: Part 2" (S14E19) "Dark Wish: Part 3" (S14E20)
2006	Moon TV	Himself / Various characters	Series regular, unknown episodes
2006	Shortland Street	John Markson	Guest role, unknown episodes
2007	Outrageous Fortune	Franklin "Corky" Corke	"Put the Strong Law on Him" (S03E06) "The Corrupted Currents of This World" (S03E21)
2008	Shortland Street	John Grainger	Guest role, unknown episodes
2008	Power Rangers Jungle Fury	Cable Guy / Cheese McAllister	"Don't Blow That Dough" (S16E26)
2009	Diplomatic Immunity	Brother Jacob	"Love My Way" (S01E04)
2009	Legend of the Seeker	Gwildor	"Mirror" (S01E18)
2009	Power Rangers RPM	Mr. McAllistair	"Ranger Blue" (S17E10)
2009	The Jaquie Brown Diaries	Sandy	"Brownward Spiral" (S02E07) "Educating Jaquie" (S02E08)
2011	Ice	Harold	Episode 1
2011	The Almighty Johnsons	Detective Turner	"This Is Not Washing Powder, My Friend" (S01E05)
2011	Underbelly NZ: Land of the Long Green Cloud	Pat Booth	"All At Sea" (Episode 3) "Marty/Party" (Episode 4) "Dominos" (Episode 5) "Thirty of Silver/One of Gold" (Episode 6)
2011–2014	Nothing Trivial	Smudge	Series regular, 27 episodes
2014–2015	Late Night Big Breakfast	Jason Hoyte	All episodes
2015–present	The Brokenwood Mysteries	Ray Neilson	20 Episodes
2016	Terry Teo	Mayor Bob Jamieson	3 episodes
2016–2017	The Barefoot Bandits	Mr. Black	"Invasion of the Budgie Smuglers"(S01E06) "Back for Moa" (S02E08)
2018	Screaming Reels	Jason Hoyte	All Episodes (Co-Host)
2019	Quimbo's Quest	Reginald	"Croco-Denial/Tusk Justice" (Episode 5)
2019–2022	Wellington Paranormal	Captain Quinn	"Taniwha" (S02E01) "The Wicked Man" (S04E02)
2021	Talkback	Malcolm White	All episodes (6)

=== Film ===
Year	Title	Role	Notes
2002	Beautiful	Kev	Short film
2007	We're Here to Help	Steve Arnett	Drama
2009	I Was the DJ	Barry Plugg	Short film
2010	Spies and Lies	Martini	Drama
2010	Stolen	DS Peter Burt	Based on true story
2010	The Insatiable Moon	Kevin	Drama
2014	What We Do in the Shadows	Julian	Comedy / Horror
