= Spellbound (Dale novel) =

2008 children's novel by Anna Dale

- First edition
- Author: Anna Dale
- Language: English
- Genre: fantasy, magic
- Publisher: Bloomsbury Publishing
- Publication date: 2008
- Publication place: United Kingdom
- Media type: Print (Hardback and paperback)
- Pages: 280 pp
- ISBN: 978-0-7475-9479-6

Spellbound is a 2008 fantasy/magic novel for children and the 3rd to have been written by British author Anna Dale, the author of Whispering to Witches and Dawn Undercover.

Spellbound is used by the University of Winchester as an example of a book produced by an alumnus of their Creative Writing program who has gone on to become a successful author.

== Plot ==
12-year-old Athene Enright is bossy and cruel to her cheery, 6-year-old brother, Zach. On their family summer holiday she encounters a separate species from humans called the Humble Gloam. When she makes best friends with two of them, Humdudgeon and Huffkin, Athene learns about the Low Gloam and their prisoners. Is this a perfect way to get rid of Zach?

However, before long Athene starts to see how much her brother really means to her and so with Humdudgeon and Huffkin she begins an unforgettable journey to save her brother and all the prisoners from the dreaded Low Gloam.

== Characters ==
- Athene Enright: clever but bossy and very moody. Athene loathes her little brother, Zach, but does she really?
- Zachery Enright: Zach for short, he is happy-go-lucky and adores his sister despite her hatred for him.
- Humdudgeon: Athene's humble Gloam friend, kind and wise, but hides behind the lie of his injured leg.
- Huffkin: Athene's other humble Gloam friend, she is friendly and fun with a great personality.

== Reception ==
On publication the novel was generally well received. Anna Gannon of Inis magazine said she saw "parallels to Alice in Wonderland". . American reviewer Usha Reynolds called the book "charming and funny". Books for Keeps' Huw Thomas described it as a "beautifully crafted tale."

The book has been recommended as an example of magical storytelling by the Daily Telegraph's Toby Clements. Other reviewers have said it reminds them of the works of Enid Blyton and C. S. Lewis.

5 editions of the book have been published between 2008 and 2010.
