= The Crowd Goes Wild =

- Genre: Sports
- Created by: Ric Salizzo
- Directed by: Kingsley Hockley; Scott Cleator; Tea Manuel; Matt Quin
- Presented by: Andrew Mulligan; Storm Purvis
- Starring: Andrew Mulligan; James McOnie; Taylor Curtis; Josh Kronfeld; Wairangi Koopu; Anna Willcox-Silfverberg; Storm Purvis; Brook Ruscoe
- Country of origin: New Zealand
- Original language: New Zealand English
- No. of seasons: continuing from 2006

Production
- Executive producer: Matt Quin
- Producers: Ra Pomare
- Cinematography: Sean Crossan
- Editors: Oliver Harman, Sean Crossan
- Camera setup: Multi-camera
- Running time: 30 minutes

Original release
- Network: Sky Open
- Release: 26 June 2006 – present

The Crowd Goes Wild is a sports entertainment show broadcast on New Zealand nationwide television channel Sky Open. The show premiered on Monday 26 June 2006.

Created by former SportsCafe host and veteran journalist Ric Salizzo (who had served as executive producer and occasional presenter), The Crowd Goes Wild is presented by Andrew Mulligan (also one of the home team commentators for New Zealand Breakers), Storm Purvis, Taylor Curtis, Wairangi Koopu and Brook Ruscoe with producer Ra Pomare.

The programme covers the sporting events of the moment in a lighthearted format and is broadcast live from the studios of Sky Television, combined with pre-recorded field items and clips. It airs Monday and Thursday nights across Sky Open and Sky Sport; prior to that, it aired five nights a week, Monday to Friday, at 7pm with Andrew Mulligan and Mark Richardson as co-presenters.

In late 2010 the show was moved from its live 7pm timeslot to 10:30pm, with the show being recorded at 6:30pm (and played at that time on Sky Sport 1). This move was unpopular, criticised by at least one commentator, and ultimately reversed.

In early 2011 the show was broadcast live at 6:30pm but moved back to its original 7pm timeslot in 2013. Since 2021, the show only airs twice a week (Monday and Thursday). From 2023, the team stopped wearing a full brown suit as a uniform.

Field reporters include James McOnie, former All Black Josh Kronfeld, Rugby Union player Taylor Curtis, Rugby League star Wairangi Koopu, Winter Olympic athlete Anna Willcox-Silfverberg, and former Silver Fern Storm Purvis.

== Presenters, reporters and producers ==
- Andrew Mulligan – original presenter
- Storm Purvis – presenter and reporter
- Taylor Curtis – presenter and reporter
- Wairangi Koopu – presenter and reporter
- Brook Ruscoe – presenter and reporter
- Josh Kronfeld – reporter
- Tim Provise – reporter
- Anna Willcox-Silfverberg – reporter
- James McOnie – creative producer ('producer of big ideas'), reporter and occasional presenter
- Ra Pomare – producer
- Matt Quin – executive producer

== Former staff ==
- Chris Key – reporter and occasional presenter
- Cat Tuivaiti – reporter and occasional presenter
- James Somerset – reporter – Feb 2008 to Nov 2013
- Mark Richardson – original presenter – June 2006 to Dec 2016
- Hayley Holt – reporter – Dec 2009 to Jan 2018
- Meghan Mutrie – reporter – Jun 2011 to Nov 2013
- Huw Beynon – producer, reporter and occasional presenter
- Makere Gibbons – reporter
- Ross McNaughton – producer
- Ric Salizzo – series creator and executive producer
