= Cathy Campbell =

New Zealand broadcaster and journalist

Catherine Elizabeth Campbell (c. 1962 – 23 February 2012) was a New Zealand broadcaster, journalist and public relations consultant. She worked as a presenter and reporter on radio and television, and in 1989 became the first woman to anchor a New Zealand sports show. Later she launched her own public relations company, Cathy Campbell Communications.

Campbell was the daughter of Gwen and Malcolm Campbell. She was married to television producer Ric Salizzo, and they had one son. Campbell died in 2012 from a brain tumour.

== See also ==
- List of New Zealand television personalities
