= Ric Salizzo =

New Zealand journalist (born 1962)

Ric Salizzo ONZM
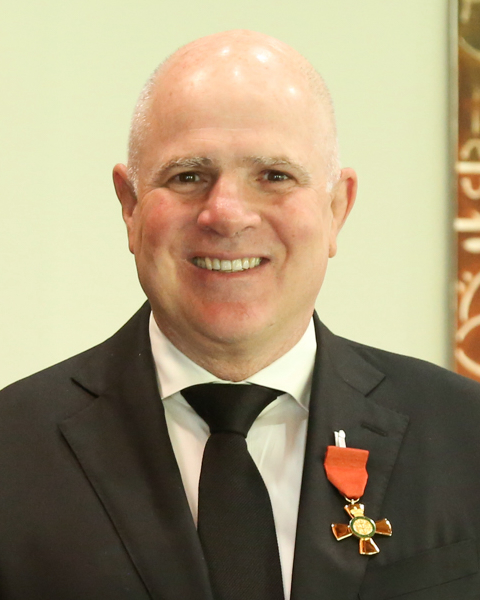
- Salizzo in 2024
- Born: Riccardo Michele Salizzo; 22 July 1962 (age 64); Auckland, New Zealand
- Spouse: Cathy Campbell (died 2012)
- Presenting career
- Show: The Crowd Goes Wild
- Stations: Prime, Sky Sport
- Network: SKY Network Television
- Time slot: 7:30pm – 7:30pm
- Country: New Zealand
- Previous shows: SportsCafe (1996–2005, 2008–2009); One News

Riccardo Michele Salizzo ONZM (born 22 July 1962) is a New Zealand journalist, rugby administrator, television presenter and producer. He is best known for producing and presenting long-running sports chat show SportsCafe, executive producing and occasionally presenting sports current events show The Crowd Goes Wild, and co-creating podcasts Sportscafe-ish and Rivals.

== Early career ==
Ric Salizzo began a career as a newsreader at radio station Whakatane's Radio 1XX. This was followed by a number of other news reading positions at private radio stations, before moving to London to work at a radio news agency there.

== Television career ==
In 1986, Salizzo returned to New Zealand to fill a vacancy at television station TVNZ's One News sports reporting team. By 1988 he presented the national sports news for the first time. It was during this period that Salizzo formed production company Pasta Productions with friend and former schoolmate, All Black Sir John Kirwan. Pasta Productions produced several documentary films about the All Blacks on tour, such as best-seller The Good, The Bad and the Rugby. In the early 1990s he was also given the job of All Blacks Media Liaison Officer, which at the time was a fledgling role within the team structure. It also entailed looking after the media hype surrounding rising star Jonah Lomu. This media hype was part of the TV3 Docudrama looking back at Jonah Lomu's life and career and Salizzo was portrayed in this programme by top New Zealand actor Phil Brown.

In 1996, Salizzo launched SportsCafe through new production company Leftfield, with initial sponsorship from the TAB. This role was to define his career, and the show's success translated into fame and recognition for Salizzo. His role on the show as both producer and presenter often involved bringing into line the other, more exuberant hosts, as well as behind-the-scenes work. At its peak, production of the show led to Salizzo part-owning a restaurant and bar complex on Auckland's Princes Wharf named Leftfield.

When SportsCafe's initial run ended in 2005, Salizzo launched a new show entitled The Sugar Shack on TV3, which was soon cancelled. It remains notable for featuring an early television appearance of comedian and actor Rhys Darby. Salizzo also produced one of the earliest TV show appearances of Flight of the Conchords.

Salizzo brought Sportscafe back in 2008 for a return season, and again in 2011 for a series of live-streamed, online-only episodes in partnership with Telecom.

In 2006, Salizzo developed a sports news show entitled The Crowd Goes Wild. It was designed to enter the tightly contested 7pm timeslot and be a flagship programme for SKY Network Television's newly acquired free-to-air channel Prime. The show has been successful and continues to run on weeknights with Salizzo as executive producer and occasional presenter.

== Other work ==
Salizzo is a past member of the Board of Directors of the Auckland Blues. He acted as Chief Engagement Officer for Rugby New York, including their Major League Rugby championship-winning season in 2023.

He is also engaged in consultancy work, advertising and public speaking from time to time. He was involved in the production and (along with the cast of SportsCafe and satirist John Clarke) performance of Fred Dagg's 1998 song "We Don't Know How Lucky We Are", which topped the New Zealand chart in July 1998. His other major contribution to the music scene came with his encouragement of, and role in the music video for, Neil Finn's anthem for the 1999 Rugby World Cup, "Can You Hear Us".

In 2024, Salizzo revived the Sportscafé brand by launching a podcast via iHeartRadio entitled Sportscafe-ish with former co-hosts Marc Ellis, Leigh Hart and Lana Coc-Kroft as well as other guests. The success of this show led to the creation of a second podcast alongside longtime collaborator John Kirwan and former Springbok international Victor Matfield, Rivals.

== Honours and awards ==
In the 2021 Queen's Birthday Honours, Salizzo was appointed an Officer of the New Zealand Order of Merit, for services to sports media.

Salizzo, along with the creators of podcast Sportscafe-ish, received awards for Best Podcast and Best Sports Podcast at the 2025 NZ Radio and Podcast Awards.
