= Candidate for a Pullet Surprise =

1994 poem by Jerrold H. Zar

- by Jerrold H. Zar
- Written: 1992
- Country: United States
- Language: English
- Genre: Humour
- Publisher: Journal of Irreproducible Results
- Publication date: 1994
- Lines: 36

"Candidate for a Pullet Surprise" is a poem by Jerrold H. Zar, based on an earlier short poem by Mark Eckman. It was first published in 1994 in the humour magazine Journal of Irreproducible Results. The poem uses homophones to illustrate the problem of relying on a spell checker. It was widely circulated as a viral email, often in altered form without attribution, and has been reproduced in numerous works on writing, editing, and publishing ethics.

== Composition ==
Use of electronic mail rapidly increased in the early 1990s. Mark Eckman was working for AT&T, where a division had formed over whether a spelling checker should be included in the company's email client. This had devolved into an argument about whether people who couldn't spell should use email. In hopes of inspiring fresh discussion, Eckman wrote a two-verse poem which appeared in AT&T Today, the company's e-mail news digest, in 1991. According to Eckman, the poem had the opposite effect and further polarized the debate, though he soon received "pages of additional verses" by email.

Jerrold H. Zar, then the Dean of the Graduate School of Northern Illinois University, was inspired by Eckman's poem and wrote "Candidate for a Pullet Surprise" in 1992. The first two verses are based on Eckman's poem and the title was suggested by Pamela Brown. Zar stated in 2012 that he had never recited the poem, as its impression is made only when read.

I have a spelling checker
It came with my PC
It highlights for my review
Mistakes I cannot sea.

— 1991 poem by Mark Eckman
Translation:

I have a spelling checker,
It came with my PC.
It plane lee marks four my revue
Miss steaks aye can knot sea.

— "Candidate for a Pullet Surprise"
by Jerrold H. Zar

The poems gradually increase their use of homophones, which a spell checker would treat as correct. According to Zar, 127 of his poem's 225 words are incorrect, though correctly spelled.

== Publication history ==
The poem was first published in the science humour magazine Journal of Irreproducible Results in the Jan–Feb 1994 issue, and was reprinted in that publication in 2000.

It circulated widely as a viral email, often amended, retitled, or with erroneous attribution. On some websites it is titled as "Owed to a Spell Checker", "Spellbound" or "Spell Checker Blues" with authorship to "Anonymous" or "Sauce unknown".

The poem has also been reproduced in numerous books on writing, editing, and publishing ethics. It is reproduced in the foreword of the English Style Guide of the University of Johannesburg.

== Reception ==
The poem has been noted as a cautionary tale for over-reliance on technology.

Writing for ThoughtCo, Richard Nordquist described the poem as "an exercise in homophonous humor". In Public Relations Writing, Donald and Jill Treadwell wrote that the poem has "humor that hits home for most professional writers".

It inspired the children's poem "Would yew bee happy two no it".

== See also ==
- Holorime
