= Daniel Willcox =

New Zealand sailor

Dan Willcox
Personal information
- Full name: Daniel Willcox
- Nationality: New Zealander
- Born: 8 June 1990 (age 36) Takapuna, New Zealand

Sailing career
- Sport: Sailing
- Club: Murrays Bay Sailing Club
- Class: 470
Medal record
Men's sailing
Representing New Zealand
World Championships
Silver medal – second place	2016 San Isidro	470 class

Daniel Willcox (born 8 June 1990) is a New Zealand sailor.

== Early life ==
Willcox was born in 1990 in Takapuna on Auckland's North Shore. His father, Hamish Willcox, was a professional sailor who competed in the America's Cup and his sister, Anna Willcox-Silfverberg, competed at the 2014 Winter Olympics in freestyle skiing.

== Professional career ==
He was a competitor in the 2016 470 World Championships in San Isidro, Buenos Aires where he won a silver medal. Willcox competed at the 2016 Rio Summer Olympics in the Men's 470 alongside Paul Snow-Hansen; they finished in tenth place.
