= Anna Dale =

English novelist (b. 1971)

- Born: 1971 (age 54–55); Suffolk
- Occupation: Novelist
- Writing career
- Period: 2004–present
- Genre: Fantasy
- Subject: Magic
- Notable work: Whispering to Witches
- Website: Publisher website

Anna Dale (born 1971) is an English novelist for children's literature, who rose to prominence after her novel, Whispering to Witches, was published in 2004.

== Early life ==
Dale was born in 1971, and lived in Suffolk and Hampshire before settling in Essex when she was seven. Dale spent most of her childhood in a village called Writtle, and attended the local grammar school.

She left Writtle to study History at the University of Kent at Canterbury, and she lived in Canterbury for three years. Later, when she came to write Whispering to Witches, she drew on her memories of student days in Canterbury. She then got an MA in Writing for Children from King Alfred's College in Winchester.

== Career ==
She was working as a bookshop assistant in Southampton when Whispering to Witches was picked up by Bloomsbury Publishing, publisher of the Harry Potter books. The book was reprinted several times and was distributed in 12 countries.

== Works ==
- Whispering to Witches (2004)
- Dawn Undercover (2005)
- Spellbound (2008)
- Magical Mischief (2010)
