= Saturday Breakfast =

- Genre: News program, Live-action
- Presented by: Toni Street; Tāmati Coffey; Brooke Dobson (news); Sam Wallace (weather)
- Country of origin: New Zealand
- Original language: English
- No. of seasons: 1

Production
- Running time: 120 minutes

Original release
- Network: TV ONE
- Release: 3 September 2011 – 15 December 2012

Saturday Breakfast is a New Zealand morning news and talk show based on Breakfast, that aired on Saturday mornings from 7-9 am from 3 September 2011 until 15 December 2012 on TV One.

== Presenters ==
=== Anchors ===
- Tāmati Coffey and Nadine Chalmers-Ross (2012)
- Tāmati Coffey and Toni Street (2012)
- Rawdon Christie and Toni Street (2011-2012)

== Show format ==
10 minutes of news, sport and weather is presented every half hour between 7:00 and 8:30. News is presented by Brooke Dobson. Weather, presented by Sam Wallace is presented from a location around the country, usually where an event is happening.

The show has interviews with newsmakers and/or TVNZ reporters. The rest of the show has entertainment/light-hearted/special interest segments presented by Toni Street and Tāmati Coffey.

The show was cancelled by TVNZ due to its lack of commercial sustainability, caused by the withdrawal of key sponsor Lotteries New Zealand. The last show was broadcast on 15 December 2012. This coincided with host Tāmati leaving TVNZ to go overseas, and Weather reporter Sam Wallace being elevated to the Weekday Breakfast weather reporter upon Tāmati's departure. Nadine will remain as Business host on the weekday show as will newsreader, Brooke Dobson, in her primary role as Auckland reporter.
