= Anna Willcox-Silfverberg =

New Zealand freestyle skier

Anna Willcox-Silfverberg (born 9 April 1992) is a New Zealand and Swedish freestyle skier and reporter for TV Show The Crowd Goes Wild.

Born in Takapuna, North Shore City, New Zealand, she competed for New Zealand at the 2014 Winter Olympics in Sochi. She finished 15th in qualification of the women's slopestyle event, missing the final by only two places.

Her father, Hamish Willcox, was a professional sailor who competed in the America's Cup and her brother, Daniel Willcox, represented New Zealand at the 2016 Summer Olympics in sailing.
