= Paul Snow-Hansen =

New Zealand sailor (born 1990)

Personal information
- Born: 3 September 1990 (age 36) Takapuna, New Zealand

Sailing career
- Sport: Sailing
- Club: Wakatere Boating Club
- Class: 470
Medal record
Men's sailing
Representing New Zealand
World Championships
Silver medal – second place	2016 San Isidro	470 class

Paul Snow-Hansen (born 3 September 1990) is a New Zealand sailor. In 2016, he sailed in the 470 World Championships in San Isidro, Buenos Aires where he won a silver medal with Daniel Willcox.

He was a competitor in the 470 class at the 2012 Summer Olympics with Jason Saunders. He competed with Daniel Willcox at the 2016 Summer Olympics. In 2021, Snow-Hansen and Willcox won the open men's 470 European Championship, sailed off Vilamoura in Portugal.

Of Māori descent, Snow-Hansen affiliates to the Ngāpuhi iwi.
