= Toni Street =

New Zealand television presenter and sports commentator

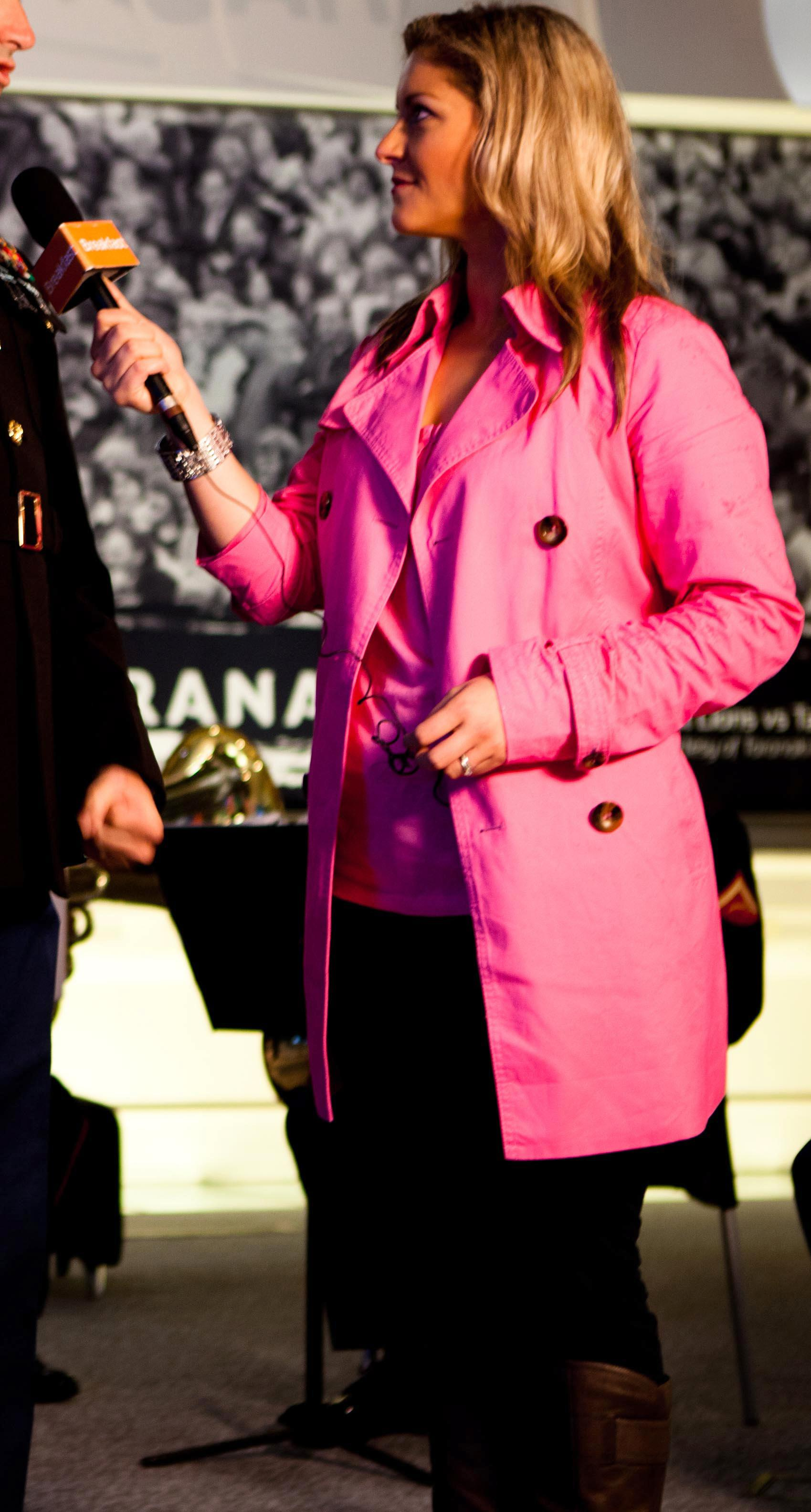
- Street in 2012
- Born: Toni Maree Street; 8 September 1983 (age 43); New Plymouth, New Zealand
- Education: University of Canterbury
- Occupation: Broadcaster
- Years active: 2006–present
- Employer: TVNZ
- Television: One News; Saturday Breakfast; Seven Sharp
- Spouse: Matt France (m. 2009)
- Children: 3

Toni Maree Street (born 8 September 1983) is a New Zealand television presenter and sports commentator. She is best known for co-hosting the New Zealand current affairs programme Seven Sharp alongside Mike Hosking, as well as presenting morning shows and sports reporting for One News.

== Personal life ==
Street was born in New Plymouth on 8 September 1983, a twin with brother Lance, who died of leukaemia when they were both 18 months old. She grew up in Taranaki, and attended Highlands Intermediate School and also New Plymouth Girls' High School, and was head girl in her last year. Toni attended Lincoln University on a sports scholarship, and studied commerce. In 2005 she studied for a postgraduate diploma in journalism at the University of Canterbury.

Street married North Harbour rugby halfback Matt France, in December 2009. They have two daughters.

After six years of poor health, and the removal of her gallbladder, she was diagnosed with eosinophilic granulomatosis with polyangiitis in 2015.

== Television career ==
Street initially joined Television New Zealand (TVNZ) in 2006 on a six-month internship. She was presenter for TVNZ's coverage of ANZ Championship and international netball. She assumed the reins from the TVNZ duo of Lavina Good and Brendan Telfer, who both stood down after the completion of National Bank Cup netball in 2007.

Street was part of TVNZ's commentary team for the 2008 Summer Olympics in Beijing. She was to be part of TVNZ's commentary team for the 2012 Summer Olympics in London, but dropped out when she discovered she was pregnant.

In 2010, TVNZ lost the rights for netball coverage and Street moved into a senior role with One News, as a head sports reporter and substitute presenter for the sports bulletin.

In September 2011, TVNZ established Saturday Breakfast, a weekend version of Breakfast, and Street was appointed co-presenter alongside Rawdon Christie and later alongside Tāmati Coffey. She was also a backup presenter for the weekday Breakfast. In September 2012, Street took maternity leave, and was replaced by finance presenter Nadine Chalmers-Ross for two months until the show was cancelled.

In 2013, Street replaced Petra Bagust as permanent co-host of the weekday Breakfast, alongside her former Saturday Breakfast co-host Rawdon Christie.

In 2014, she and Mike Hosking joined Jesse Mulligan on the Seven Sharp panel.

In 2016, she hosted the spelling bee television series Spellbound.

== See also ==
- List of New Zealand television personalities
