= Charlie's =

New Zealand beverage company

Charlie's Group Limited
- Type: Subsidiary
- Industry: Food
- Genre: Beverage Producer
- Predecessor: Spectrum Resources
- Founded: 1999; 27 years ago
- Founder: Marc Ellis; Stefan Lepionka; Simon Neal
- Headquarters: Auckland, New Zealand
- Products: Fruits, Fruit Juices
- Revenue: NZ$30,046 (2008)
- Parent: Asahi
- Subsidiaries: Charlie's Juice; Phoenix Organics
- Website: Charlies.co.nz

Charlie's Group Limited is a New Zealand-based producer of fruit juices and fruit-based soft drinks. It is owned by the Japanese beverage company Asahi.

Charlie's was founded in 1999 by Marc Ellis, Stefan Lepionka and Simon Neal. Originally the company produced fresh orange juice; in 2001, Charlie's added other natural fruit juices. They also sell loose fruit, fruit smoothies and sports water flavoured with fruit juices.

In May 2008, Charlie's launched a line of fruit-based soft drinks. It marketed its products as "Honest", referring to the fact that the products are not from concentrate with no sugar added.

Charlie's listed on the NZX in 2006. In 2008, Charlie's opened a new plant in Renmark, South Australia.

In 2007, a Charlie's television commercial that featured children playing with fireworks was banned in New Zealand after the Television Commercials Approval Bureau received letters of complaint. The commercial showed cartoon children allowing fireworks to explode between their teeth and shooting rockets at each other. The acting Fire Service national commander Paul McGill said:

"It's really disappointing that an advertiser will use this occasion to produce a commercial that glorifies behaviour that was unacceptable 20 years ago and is unacceptable today."

Ron Curteis, Charlie's marketing manager indicated that the commercial was not intended to condone such behavior and that they had not realised this sort of behavior was still a big issue. Marc Ellis, director of Charlie's, later called for an overhaul of the advertising rules noting that the same panel who banned the commercial had initially certified that the commercial met all advertising standards. The ban eventually became part of a larger discussion about the difference between content allowed in programming versus advertisement.

In July 2011, Japanese beverage company Asahi acquired Charlie's.
