= Spellbound (New Zealand TV series) =

2016 spelling bee TV series

- Genre: Game show
- Country of origin: New Zealand
- Original language: English

Original release
- Network: TVNZ 1
- Release: 9 October – 22 October 2016

Spellbound is a 2016 New Zealand spelling bee television series. In it, 36 Year 9 and 10 students compete in the New Zealand Spelling Bee final. There are three episodes, which were each aired on a Sunday night. Hosted by television presenter Toni Street, the programme was produced by Greenstone TV and was funded by Chloe Wright's Family Foundation.

The New Zealand Spelling Bee had been running since 2005 and this was the first time it was broadcast on television. Before the final, the students competed in a written test and then 200 of them competed in regional semifinals. The spelling bee was won by Finn Lewis, from Wellington, after spelling the word 'ostensible'.

The parents of the contestants were kept backstage and would speak to the cameras.

== See also ==
- The Great New Zealand Spelling Bee
- Guy Montgomery's Guy Mont-Spelling Bee
