= Dawn Undercover =

Book by Anna Dale

- First edition
- Author: Anna Dale
- Language: English
- Genre: Children's novel
- Publisher: Bloomsbury Publishing
- Publication date: 2005
- Publication place: United Kingdom
- Media type: Print (Hardback & Paperback)
- Pages: 368 pp (paperback edition)
- ISBN: 978-0-7475-7746-1 (paperback edition)
- OCLC: 70402011

Dawn Undercover is British writer Anna Dale's second novel, published in 2005 by Bloomsbury Children's Books, for children aged 8-12. It is a humorous mystery adventure book.

== Characters ==
- Dawn Buckle
- Murdo Meeks
- Trudy Harris
- Philippa Killingback
- Felix Pomeroy-Pitt
- Angela Bradshaw.
