= Whispering to Witches =

2004 book by Anna Dale

- First edition
- Author: Anna Dale
- Cover artist: Melvyn Grant
- Language: English
- Genre: Children's novel
- Publisher: Bloomsbury Publishing
- Publication date: 2004
- Publication place: United Kingdom
- Media type: Print (hardback and paperback)
- Pages: 280 pp (paperback edition)

Whispering to Witches is British writer Anna Dale's first novel, published in 2004 by Bloomsbury Publishing. It is a magical mystery adventure intended for children age 8–12. It was publisher Bloomsbury's main title for Autumn 2004 and was scheduled for distribution in the UK, the United States, Germany, and other countries.

The book is drawn from her 2001 Master's dissertation in writing for children.

The story follows the adventures of a young boy named Joe Binks who makes the acquaintance of a young witch nicknamed Twiggy. The two are caught up in a whirlwind of magical adventures and mysteries as they search for the evil being who is trying to halt the spread of the magical community, thus ceasing the existence of witches forever.

== Plot summary ==
When Joe Binks' father, Nicholas Binks, announces to him that they will not be spending Christmas together in London, Joe is distraught. Joe's Great-aunt Adelaide has taken a fall, and Nick is going to spend time with her because she's not doing well. Joe boards a train in King's Cross Station heading for Canterbury so that he can spend the Holidays with his mother, Merle, and her new family (Joe's stepdad, Gordon, and his younger sister, Esme).

While on the train, Joe makes the acquaintance of a woman with black hair wearing a pink woolen suit filling out a crossword puzzle with a marble green fountain pen, and a man in a pinstriped suit with an S-shaped tattoo on his wrist talking on a cellular phone. The three exchange light small talk, and the woman points out that Joe dropped his ticket on the ground. Shortly after retrieving his ticket, a glamorous woman wearing a black velvet coat sits down next to Joe. She carries a cat basket on her lap with two rats in it. The lights in the car go out, and Joe seems to notice several flashes of light that show two rats fighting a snake the same colour as the fountain pen, and the other two adults have vanished. Shortly after, Joe exits the train.

A stoutly woman wearing a long black dress and a navy blue coat rudely collects Joe's ticket, and scurries away. Joe then meets two people who work at the train station, who inform Joe that he's gotten off at the wrong stop, and that he gave his ticket to an imposter. They provide him with a tricycle that he may use to ride home to his mother's house. As he begins his journey home, Joe notices the tricycle has a mind of its own as it rushes him away to a building on Weaver's Street with a crooked chimney and purple door.

He meets several women in what appears to be an office building, the first of which is a girl named Twiggy, who appears to be his age and has wily unkempt brown hair. The next is Rose, a grumpy older woman, who gives Joe a hard time. The third is a tall blonde woman named Winifred, and the fourth is an eccentric, grey and frizzy-haired woman named Patsy. An older gentleman named Julius sits in an armchair behind them. Joe notices that all the women are dressed exclusively in black, have several very old-fashioned brooms, wands, and several witch hats are situated on hat-blocks. Joe learns that the women are witches, and the tricycle that he used to get from the station home was actually a bewitched broomstick, disguised to look like a tricycle so that Patsy could ride it in public. Patsy, however, appears to have a horrible habit of transforming objects into something else, and losing them. Apparently, her cat Squib was transformed into something, and has yet to resurface. Patsy transforms the tricycle back onto her broomstick. In her incantation, Patsy references objects called the Spillikins of Doom, which is a foreign name to Twiggy. When Twiggy questions Patsy about what they are, Patsy explains that she doesn't know what they are, but they are referenced in the most popular magical book, called Mabel's Book.

The witches explain that they are part of a coven, a group of witches who live and work together, called the Dead-nettle Coven. Joe learns that witches are a dying breed, and the Coven is currently recruiting any remaining coven-less witches. Twiggy shows Joe an advertisement written with witchy ink, which is invisible to non-magical folk, on a maple leaf (also known as a leaflet) that are dispersed by tiny winged beings called windsprites. Twiggy has made close friends with one windsprite in particular, named Cuthbert. Joe takes note of the time, and realises that he should get home to his family. Twiggy and Winfred accompany him home. Before he goes inside, Winifred pulls out a funnel, called a fundibule, and two jam-jars. With the fundibule, she wipes Joe's memory of ever meeting the witches, and replaces it with a memory of him rowing a boat home.

After being awoken by his younger half-sister Esme, Joe goes downstairs, and has a brief conversation about his escapades last night with his stepdad, Gordon, before his mother comes downstairs and announces that she'll be taking Joe and Esme shopping with her for the day. While shopping, Joe notices that there's a girl who keeps following wherever he goes. After constant begging from Esme, Merle brings her children over to the library so that Esme can return her book, Pigeons in Peril and get a new one.

The girl approaches Joe in the sports section of the library, and reveals herself to be Twiggy. She produces two jam jars and a fundibule and restores his memory of last evening and his encounter with the witches of the Dead-nettle Coven. Twiggy points out that a viper was drawn on Joe's luggage in witchy ink, and she questions him about it to which he has no answers. The two realise that the librarian, Lydia, has seen them use magic, and the two follow Lydia and use the fundibule on her to wipe her memory. Twiggy receives a leaflet from Patsy calling her back to the Coven, and her and Joe decide to meet up later on at his home. Joe catches sight of the glamorous woman in a tea shop, and overhears her reprimanding an accomplice for not completing a task, and the glamorous woman, nicknamed "Slyboots", insists they leave and get back to work.

When Twiggy arrives that evening, her and Joe look over his luggage, and they discovered the viper drawn onto the corner of his bag. They head back to the Coven to try to make sense of the situation. Twiggy reveals that there is a book entitled Which Witch that gives the name and description of every witch in existence. The first witches the two decide to investigate are Harriet Perkins and Aubry White, who turn out to be the woman wearing the pink woolen suit, and the man wearing the pinstripe suite, respectively, from the train.

They realise the Coven has been burgled while they were gone. They find a re-growing potion that Patsy had been working on was stolen, and a small drop of the potion caused a branch to grow from the desk. Joe takes a piece of foil given to him by his stepdad, Gordon, and dips it into the remaining potion, and a triangular amulet with a garnet stone in the centre materialises in his hand. They also notice that a chest of Julius' was hacked open, and a book on graphology was taken from it. Twiggy is certain that the missing Squib, Patsy's cat, had to be transformed into something in the room, and would have seen exactly who burgled them. After tireless searching, Joe and Twiggy transform a dead-nettle resting on Winifred's desk into the petrified Squib, who takes an immediate liking to Joe. Twiggy realises that the Coven is out of Lingo Liquorice, which allows witches to talk to animals, and she suggests the two go to the Midnight Market to pick up some more.

As they wander through the stands, Joe and Twiggy stop momentarily at a stand that sold cats. Twiggy expresses her longing for a cat as they both admire an Amber-eyed Silver-tip; a very extravagant witches' cat. Joe and Twiggy head over to the stand where the Lingo Liquorice is sold. Twiggy trades the man at the counter a bag of handmade dead-nettle tea. Joe mocks the tea Twiggy has made and offends her, and she hurries away crying. Joe wanders through a bookshop, where he learns of Mabel's Book - a tome that was written in illegible handwriting and later translated by a magical linguist, Fleur Fortescue. Joe learns that page 513 was ripped out by Fleur in her translations. Joe purchases Twiggy an Amber-eyed Silver-tip as an apology gift, and offers the amulet he re-grew with Patsy's potion as payment. After giving the cat to Twiggy, they realise she is not really an Amber-eyed Silver-tip, and had powder on her ears and tails to appear so. Twiggy declares that she doesn't care that they have been tricked because she loves the cat anyway. The trio arrive back at the Coven where they each eat a bit of the liquorice and begin to question Squib. Squib tells them that the woman who broke in was not a witch, and was searching for the Spillikins of Doom, and stole the graphology book from Julius' chest. The witches arrive back at the Coven, and Joe escapes as they question Twiggy about the disarray of their home.

On his walk home, Joe understands two animals discussing their evening's mischief, and how their mistress will not be pleased that they were unable to produce a secret document. Joe hears that the animal's names are Dunkel and Fleck, and they are the rats that the glamorous witch carried with her on the train. He takes note of which way the rats scurried away into the forest, and returns home.

After a morning spent with his family, Joe and Twiggy go for a walk in the direction that Dunkel and Fleck scurried away. The two arrive at an eerie cottage called Two Hoots and explore the grounds. They begin to leave, when they are captured by a witch of a rival coven, the Pipistrelle Coven, who brings them back to her headquarters. At the Pipistrelle Coven, Joe recognises the leader, Dora Bailey, to be the woman who he gave his ticket to when he got off the train at the wrong station. Dora Bailey explained that the Aubrey White and Harriet Perkins were members of the Viper Coven, who were transporting page 513 from Mabel's Book safely to Head Office. When Logan Dritch, the glamorous woman, boarded the train, Harriet gave Joe the spell on what appeared to be a ticket. When Joe handed his ticket over to Dora, he gave her his actual ticket, not page 513. The witches demand to know where Joe has put the page, and that he turn it over to them, but he claims he does not have it. A leaflet comes from Head Office that explains that Mabel's Book has been stolen from the National Museum of Witchcraft, and as the Pipestrelle Coven begins to sob, Twiggy and Joe escape on Dora's broom. Joe and Twiggy head over to the museum to look for clues.

As Joe and Twiggy have lunch, Joe realises that he saw Mabel's Book sitting on a table at Two Hoots cottage, and that Logan Dritch must be trying to use Patsy's re-growing potion on page 513. The two fly to Two Hoots, and witness Logan Dritch in a rage. The potion will regrow the physical page, but does not regenerate the writings of Mabel. The two are nearly caught by Logan Dritch, but Joe hurls snowballs at her as she chases after them, and Twiggy flies off on her broomstick. The two reconvene on the road, and wonder whether they are being followed. They decide that it doesn't appear so, and they head home for the evening.

In a turn of events at home, Joe learns that his father has gone missing in Scotland, and the police are unable to find him. In desperation, Joe strikes a bargain with Twiggy: he will provide her with the missing page of Mabel's Book, and she will allow him to use her broom, and prepare him a thawing potion to save his father.

Joe searches endlessly for the page, but is unable to find the page in his room. He then realises that his sister, Esme was using it as a page marker, and questions her of its whereabouts. She explains that she must have left it in her book when they returned it to the library. Joe and Twiggy meet in his backyard, and discuss their plans to go to the library to locate the missing page. Once they arrive, they realise someone has already beat them to finding it, and they are left to battle Dunkel and Fleck who bite Joe, and leave a serious gash on his leg. Joe takes Twiggy's broom and goes to search for his father. Twiggy's broom begins to falter, and Joe questions whether he should go search for his father, or help the witches continue to search for the missing page of Mabel's Book. Joe instructs the broom to take him to Two Hoots cottage, where he is sure Twiggy will be.

Joe arrives at Two Hoots cottage, and sees that Twiggy and his sister Esme are being held captive by someone. He crashes through the window, and to his surprise, Lydia the librarian is their captor. She threatens to kill Esme if Joe doesn't co-operate, so reluctantly he does. Lydia explains that she is not a witch, and is the twin sister of Logan Dritch. Lydia reveals she's been trying to decipher the contents of the page with help from the graphology book stolen from Julius' chest. Logan Dritch arrives, and insists on having a private word with Twiggy. Lydia takes Joe and Esme into the study where she explains that she has a collection of over 300 windsprites in a fish tank on the bookcase. Lydia tells Joe that Two Hoots cottage is actually hers, and explains in full what Joe encountered that night on the train. Logan engaged in a magical battle with Aubrey and Harriet, and transformed them into slugs that Lydia is keeping in her study, and explains that they kidnapped Esme to ensure that Joe would come back to Two Hoots for Twiggy. Joe asks what the spell on page 513 does, and Lydia tells Joe that he'll find out in time. Logan enters and announces it's time for Twiggy and her to play a game: the Spillikins of Doom.

They all enter the attic where Twiggy and Logan prepare to play the game. Esme has a tantrum and begins to wail. When Logan threatens to attack her, Dunkel bites her hand. Logan, in turn, throws her through a window in the attic, and Fleck runs downstairs to attend to her. Twiggy and Logan begin to play, and Twiggy wins. Logan is transformed into a lump of coal, and Lydia retrieves the lump and locks Twiggy, Esme, and Joe in the attic. They deduce that Lydia lied about the rules to Logan so that she would be sure to lose.

The group escapes from the attic and find Lydia in her study trying to force a strange liquid, the Flabbergast Potion which renders the drinker mute, into the throats of the windsprites. It turns out, that windsprites are the creatures that give witches their tremendous power by whispering a secret word into the ears of babies. By feeding the windsprites a potion that will mute them, they will no longer be able to pass along the word that turns mortal babies into witches. Ironically, while most witches sought after the secrets behind the Spillikins of Doom on page 513, they were overlooking the recipe for the dangerous Flabbergast potion on page 514. After learning this, Joe smashes the fish tank and frees all of the windsprites, who begin to pester Lydia. The door bursts open, and the witches of the Dead-nettle Coven appear. Dunkel brings the almost-dead Fleck in, and Joe revives her with the little bit of thawing potion that he has. They transform the two slugs back into Aubrey and Harriet. Twiggy and Winifred restore Aubrey and Harriet to their normal selves, and Dunkel and Fleck are turned back into wolves. Aubrey thanks the witches of Dead-nettle, and tells that they are to be awarded the Coven of the Year Award. Twiggy realises that Dunkel and Fleck must want to go home, so Joe and her apply flying ointment to the pads of their paws, and before they fly away Twiggy whispers something to them while Joe thanks them. With Mabel's Book and page 513 recovered, the group prepare to leave after Julius uses the fundibule on Lydia to omit her memory of all the previous events.

Winifred walks Joe and Esme home, and does not wipe their memories. The next day, as they walk through the park, Twiggy catches up with Joe and asks about the whereabouts of his dad. Joe tells her that there haven't been any updates. Twiggy then tells Joe that he's been made an honorary member of the Dead-nettle Coven, which is a huge witchy honour. Cuthbert flies in with a newspaper for Joe that details that his father, Nick, has been found alive. Two wolves found him, and howled around him until he was saved: Dunkel and Fleck. Joe realises that Twiggy sent them to find him, and thanks her greatly for everything. The two exchange Christmas wishes, and their story ends.

== Characters ==
- Prunella 'Twiggy' Brushwood: Twiggy is a young witch around Joe's age. She is depicted, on the cover, as having wily unkempt brown hair, and is typically portrayed wearing all black, in the fashion of most witches. Twiggy and Joe become fast friends as she educates him about the fantastical world of witchcraft. Because Twiggy is a younger witch, she feels that she is a slave to the Coven: rather than truly teaching her how to become a real witch, she feels that she is constantly bogged down with frivolous errands, and tea preparation. Regardless, Twiggy cares very deeply about the Coven, and Joe, and remains a steadfast and loyal friend to all.
- Joe Binks: Joe, as depicted on the cover, has hair the colour of honey, and typically wears a blue jumper. He is entering his adolescent years, and is grappling issues with his mother and father's divorce. He is less than thrilled when his father tells him that he will be spending Christmas with his mother, Merle. While Joe can behave in a very juvenile fashion, he continued to mock Twiggy's teas that she prepared for trading in the Midnight Market, he is also a very caring young man as he demonstrates when he assists the betterment of the magical community over searching for his father, and when he spares the last bit of thawing potion for the dying Dunkel.
- Nicholas Binks: We don't learn very much about Nicholas Binks, other than the fact that he and his son appear to be very close, as Joe is seriously disappointed that they can't celebrate Christmas together and that he goes missing when his taxi breaks down during a storm in Scotland
- Merle: Merle is Joe's mother that he appears to be very distant from. She has honey coloured hair, and appears to be some sort of new aged hippie as she drags her children to a store called Amulet that sells books about chakras, and auras and has all kinds of candles and incense in foreign scents to Joe and his younger sister, Esme. She appears to be often annoyed by her children, and runs off to be with her friends whenever she can. As Merle rushes away to go help one of her friends, Esme even notes "Why does Mum always rush off like that?...Do you think she gets bored with us?".
- Gordon: Gordon is Joe's stepdad, and Esme's biological father. He is constantly making light conversation with Joe, and always doing his best to make him feel at home and comfortable with his new family.
- Esme: Esme is Joe's half sister, who he finds to be rather spooky. He explains that she has sleek hair, large grey eyes and glowing skin. She is often portrayed reading a book, and often expresses a longing for a pet, specifically a cat.
- Winifred Whirlbat: Winifred is the leader of the Dead-nettle Coven. She wears all black, like her fellow witches of Dead-nettle Coven. Winifred has a short blonde haircut, and is very tall. While she does not assist Twiggy and Joe in their adventures, she remains a steadfast and respected leader to her Coven, and later the magical community.
- Rosemary 'Rose' Threep: Rose is a grumpy old witch who continues to amaze Joe with her attitude all throughout their first encounter. She is depicted as being a short woman, with her hair wrapped up in a tight bun, who wears all black. Although she does have a dark past, she was once a member of an evil group of witches called The Monsters of Much Marcle, she has since switched over to the side of the good witches, and is not chastised for her past by anyone in the Coven.
- Patsy Bogbean: Patsy is an eccentric older witch who has frizzy grey hair that is tied up in a bun, and wears tattered black dresses. She is notorious for transforming her belongings, among them being her broomstick and her black cat, Squib, into random objects and misplacing them. She is the inventor of the re-growing potion that Logan and Lydia Dritch try to use to regenerate the missing page in Mabel's Book ripped out by Fleur Fortescue.
- Julius: Julius is an older male witch who belongs to the Dead-nettle Coven. He is explained to have a "fluffy mass of white hair".
- Harriet Perkins: Harriet is a member of the Viper Coven. She is one of the two witches transporting page 513 to Head Office when she is attacked by Dora Benton. She is described as toting a dazzling marble green fountain pen, and wearing a pink woolen suit.
- Aubrey White: Aubrey is an uncommon find: he is the leader of the Viper Coven. He is the second of the two witches transporting page 513 to Head Office.
- Lydia Dritch: Lydia is the jealous and bitter twin sister of Logan Dritch. She plans to wipe out the entire witch population by muting windsprites who give witches their tremendous power. Lydia is a proper librarian, and typically portrayed wearing some kind of sweater, pearls, and her hair is always pulled back in a tight bun.
- Logan Dritch: Long is the evil witch who is searching for page 513 for twenty plus years. Her and Rose were the original members of the Monsters of Much Marcle. Logan is a very glamorous woman, always dressed to the nines, and sporting red nails and lips. She treats all humans as lesser beings, thus fuelling the bitterness in her sister, Lydia.

== See also ==
- Anna Dale
- J.K. Rowling
- Harry Potter
- L. Frank Baum
- The Wonderful Wizard of Oz
- Roald Dahl
- The Witches
