= Storm Purvis =

New Zealand netball player

Personal information
- Born: 20 April 1993 (age 33) Christchurch, New Zealand
- Height: 1.86 m (6 ft 1 in)
- School: Diocesan School for Girls
- University: Otago University

Netball career
- Playing positions: GD, GK
Years	Club team	Apps
2012–2016	Southern Steel	42
2016–2017	Northern Mystics	15
2018–present	Northern Stars	16
- (Correct as of 29 May 2019)
Years	National team	Caps
2010–present	NZ U21	
- (Correct as of 24 December 2012)

Storm Purvis (born 20 April 1993) is a New Zealand netball player who plays for the Silver Ferns internationally, and for the Northern Stars in the ANZ Premiership. She plays in the GD and GK positions.

Purvis started her netball career playing for Auckland Waitakere, and was a Northern Mystics training partner in 2011 before moving to Dunedin and picking up a contract with the Steel in 2012. She was selected into the NZ U21 team in 2010, and was named captain in 2012. During the series she was played in the unfamiliar position of WD at times.

Purvis made her ANZ Championship debut in the first game of 2012, coming on in the last quarter against Silver Ferns stalwart Irene Van Dyk, and picking off a vital intercept which led to the Steel's shock win against the Waikato Bay of Plenty Magic. A solid season saw Purvis nominated for the Best Young Player award. She was rewarded by being selected into the NZ Accelerant Squad in 2012. A series of knee injuries hindered Purvis’ ability to play more international games and she retired from domestic and international netball in 2020. During the 2022 ANZ Premiership season, Purvis was called upon by her previous team Northern Stars as a COVID-19 replacement. This marked her 100th match played.

Purvis is a reporter/presenter on The Crowd Goes Wild.
