= Moon TV =

New Zealand television series

- Written by: Leigh Hart
- Directed by: Leigh Hart
- Starring: Leigh Hart; Matt Johnson; Richard Thompson; Joe Bennett; Justin Shuttleworth; Andrew Johnson; Jack Hart
- Country of origin: New Zealand
- Original language: English
- No. of series: 6
- No. of episodes: 47 (list of episodes)

Production
- Editor: Brent Spillane
- Running time: 30 minutes
- Production company: Moon Enterprises

Original release
- Network: Sky 1 (2002); TV2 (2005–2010); TV3 (2011)
- Release: 2002 – 27 October 2010

Moon TV is a New Zealand comedy television series. It is produced by Leigh Hart. In 2006 the show received $176,324 in funding from NZ On Air for six half-hour episodes, to screen on TV2.

The show has run for five seasons, all available for purchase on DVD. The sixth season began on 25 August 2010.

== Episodes ==
=== Series 1 ===
Series 1 was screened weekly by Sky 1 in 2002. It consisted of 7 episodes.

=== Series 2 ===
No. overall	No. in series	Title	Original release date
8	1	"Red Episode"	24 May 2005
9	2	"Blue Episode"	31 May 2005
10	3	"Yellow Episode"	7 June 2005
11	4	"White Episode"	14 June 2005
12	5	"Black Episode"	21 June 2005
13	6	"Static Episode"	28 June 2005

=== Series 3 ===
The theme for series 3 was Leigh Hart's trip across several countries.

No. overall	No. in series	Title	Original release date
14	1	TBA	31 October 2006
15	2	"Peru"	7 November 2006
16	3	"America"	14 November 2006
17	4	"Croatia"	21 November 2006
18	5	"Hong Kong"	28 November 2006
19	6	"Australia"	5 December 2006

=== Series 4 ===
The season's theme surrounds Leigh Hart and his crew's trip across New Zealand, titled the "Great New Zealand Road Trip". This season has also seen the return of Season 2's mini-shows (such as Hamsterman from Amsterdam and Bookzone), which were absent in season 3.

No. overall	No. in series	Title	Original release date
20	1	"Episode 1"	27 March 2007
21	2	"Episode 2"	3 April 2007
22	3	"Episode 3"	10 April 2007
23	4	"Episode 4"	17 April 2007
24	5	"Episode 5"	25 April 2007
25	6	"Episode 6"	1 May 2007
26	7	"Episode 7"	8 May 2007
27	8	"Episode 8"	15 May 2007

=== Series 5: MTN: Moon Television Network ===
Series 5 (10 episodes) aired from 7 May to 2 July 2008.

=== Series 6: Moon TV USA ===
Series 6 aired from 25 August to 27 October 2010. In this season, Moon TV goes to New York as the Late Night Big Breakfast is picked up by an American TV Network. However, it fails badly as no one interesting comes on the show, and it eventually gets cancelled. Also in this season, Speedo Cops go to New York on a police exchange with the NYPD and Hamsterman opens a new pet shop in New York, both of which go badly. Other Skits that appear are The Doctors (this time working in a gym calling themselves Bleep Doctors), BookZone and Speed Cooking.

=== Best of Moon TV ===
No.	Title	Original release date
1	"Episode 1"	7 January 2011
2	"Episode 2"	14 January 2011
3	"Episode 3"	21 January 2011
4	"Episode 4"	28 January 2011
5	"Episode 5"	4 February 2011

== Recurring themes ==
Each episode may contain some of the following recurring sketches.

=== Speedo Cops ===
The Speedo Cops in their entirety

This section is a spoof of reality cop shows. The main characters are Constables Scott, Martinez, Taylor, Hernandez and more recently Chief Inspector Reeves who replaced Chief Inspector Creech after 2 seasons. These characters play police officers who wear Speedos (reminiscent of character Lieutenant Jim Dangle in Reno 911!), investigating serious crimes such as minor graffiti, DVD piracy and shoppers exceeding New Zealand fishery quotas when purchasing seafood. The result of all of their investigations is to "call it in" or suggest that one of their colleagues "call it in". They are all grossly incompetent but seem unaware of this. They go on an "exchange" to New York (except Martinez) in Season 6 and appall their supervisor Lt Chicowski with their incompetence.

=== Speed Cooking ===
In this section Hart attempts to cook a complex three-course meal in less than two minutes, using original methods of preparing the food to try to get it done quicker. In reality he doesn't cook much but ends up causing great mess, and damage to the kitchen. He is sometimes accompanied by another person, such as Jo Seagar, celebrity chef.

=== The Doctors ===
A spoof of medical dramas such as ER. Throughout the seasons the doctors move their practice to various out of the ordinary locations. The main characters are Doctors Chavez, Haaughn, Buttachikan, Waverwee, Bojangles, Fabio, Bernaise, Nurse Yee and the evil Ritt Parker. This segment involves scenes of exaggerated tension between the doctors, heightened by dramatic background music.

In Season 2, this segment was called 'Sea Doctors' and was set in Kelly Tarlton's Underwater World, an aquarium in Auckland, but the operation at Kelly Tarlton's was shut down after being caught running a takeaway shop after hours.

The clinic was then moved to the Paradise skating rink for seasons three and four. Here the doctors risk being demoted to skate hire and the evil Ritt Parker plots to kill Doctor Bojangles. This fails as Dr. Bojangles uses his male companion for 'warmth' in a manner parodying Brokeback Mountain.

In Season five we find the doctors running an "Authentic Indian Restaurant" in the series "Naan Doctors". Here they must turn the failing business around and cure patients. It deals heavily with Dr Bojangles' survival of the harsh Antarctic winter and the tension between Dr Bojangles and Ritt Parker.

In Season 6, we find the doctors running a gym in the series Bleep Doctors. It was originally going to be called Zumba Doctors, but due to some controversy with the Zumba company they are not allowed to be called Zumba Doctors.

=== Bookzone: A Show About Books ===
According to Hart, "it's a relaxed book show where, as you can see, I'm wearing my blue jeans, and it's where we talk to acclaimed writers and people like that."

On every episode, Hart interviews the same person—columnist Joe Bennett. He invariably fails to interview Bennett but talks aimlessly about himself and his own supposed writing career and they drink "Country Medium White" cask wine (Bennett from a wine glass, Hart from a large tumbler). As every show begins Hart makes the common error of introducing the show as "Booktime"—having to have Bennett correct him on all occasions until Episode 4 Season 6 where he says "Welcome to Booktime, Bookzone, Bookworld". Hart claims to have written a book about his time in the "Himalaya", Battling the Yeti and Alcoholism. It allegedly received mixed reviews.

=== Outdoors, Outdoors, Outdoors ===
A show on a fishing boat where conventional wisdom and Leigh's more unusual methods mix to produce drama.

=== The Hamsterman from Amsterdam ===
A spoof of the Lion Man, Hamsterman from Amsterdam revolves around Colin, an alcoholic pet shop owner from Takanini who has never actually been to Amsterdam. His wife is having an affair with a furniture upholsterer. The Hamsterman wears an iconic woolen jumper with green and black stripes matched with black stubbies and is rarely seen without a pottle of yoghurt, whose contents sticks to his thick moustache. The cameraman has great difficulty in getting him to talk about anything other than pellets, even though the shop also sells fish, birds and other mammals. When audited, the Hamsterman could produce no receipts as evidence of transactions because he had shredded them all for the hamsters cage linings. He moves to New York in Season 6 and doesn't have much luck there, mostly just making customers angry and being stupid

=== MooN Explorer TV ===
A series of mock documentary shows, including Deep Probe which investigates issues such as alien abductions and mock animal documentaries. A notable entry was The Hunt for Te Kaka. Amongst the cast of Bono O'Rielly and Salted Nuts McPherson are the two submersibles Chesney and Ronan on board the Te Aroha, which is on the search for the mythical sea beast Te Kaka. The hunt is a mixed bag until there is drama and Salted Nuts McPherson fires a shot and coincidentally but not relatedly the harpoon rope gets tied to the Auckland City Council wheelie bin rather than the pontoon.

=== Buckchoi ===
A surreal puppet show in which two puppets attack each other. It usually ends with the head of at least one puppet falling off. This segment was canceled in the fourth season with a farewell episode in which a gunshot causes the puppet's head to fall off.

=== 'It's Ray!' ===
A man wearing a bright orange bodysuit and a name badge saying 'Ray' on it jumps out from various hiding places, while a voice announces, 'It's Ray!', while Ray makes various wheezing sounds. Ray appears in between the main skits.

=== Chico ===
Chico Roparty is a stand-up comic that fails to realize his comedic incompetence. He is introduced onto stage by New Zealand comedy persona Mike King. Chico makes jokes at 1 hour photo labs, cheese slices in the packets, (is anyone here from) Hastings, cell phones, e-mails, computers, shoes and other mundane everyday occurrences.

=== Sniffing Murder ===
A parody of the show Sensing Murder. This is a segment where "psychics" try to solve missing persons cases, using questionable methods, such as smelling women's underwear.

=== Late Night Big Breakfast ===
A parody of real life New Zealand breakfast programmes being filmed from the Target Furniture Hyper-mart on Dominion Rd, Auckland. This segment was based on Leigh Hart's concept of having a television network in a limited half-hour time slot, which is aired at night. The concept being: all good networks have a breakfast show, so why shouldn't MTN? Despite idealising leading news journalism, Leigh Hart concedes that the show discusses issues of no interest to non-everyday New Zealanders. The show was moved to New York in Season 6 and now is broadcast from the Oriental Marriott Hotel, New York

=== Other One-off or Minor Segments ===
One-off segments that were not a part of a series (such as MooN Explorer TV) included Homework, a house renovation show that saw the near destruction of a house. Another segment that debuted in Season 4 and was repeated in episodes 2 and 3 was a spoof of the TV3 Promo featuring Mike McRoberts and a landslide in the Philippines. The first episode featured an additional Close Up promo spoof.
