= The Great New Zealand Spelling Bee =

- Starring: Mark Leishman
- Country of origin: New Zealand

Production
- Running time: 60 minutes

Original release
- Network: TVNZ
- Release: 2006

The Great New Zealand Spelling Bee is a New Zealand game show, in which well known New Zealanders competed against each other in a Spelling bee competition. It was broadcast for one season in 2006.

== See also ==
- Guy Montgomery's Guy Mont-Spelling Bee
- Spellbound (New Zealand TV series)
