= Jerrold Zar =

American biologist (1941–2026)

- Born: Jerold Howard Zar; June 28, 1941; Chicago, Illinois, U.S.
- Died: April 2, 2026 (aged 84); DeKalb, Illinois, U.S.
- Education: University of Illinois Urbana-Champaign
- Scientific career
- Fields: Biology
- Workplaces: Northern Illinois University
- Doctoral advisor: S. Charles Kendeigh

Jerrold Howard Zar (June 28, 1941 – April 2, 2026) was an American biologist and academic who was Professor Emeritus at Northern Illinois University, having been elected as Fellow to the American Association for the Advancement of Science.

== Life and career ==
Zar received the BS degree in 1962 from Northern Illinois University. He received a MS (1964) and PhD (1967) both from the University of Illinois Urbana-Champaign.

He wrote a widely cited textbook in biostatistics.

Zar died in DeKalb, Illinois, on April 2, 2026, at the age of 84.
