= SportsCafe =

New Zealand sports television series

- Genre: Sport, Comedy
- Created by: Ric Salizzo
- Written by: Ric Salizzo
- Starring: Lana Coc-Kroft; Marc Ellis; Leigh Hart; Graeme Hill; Ric Salizzo
- Country of origin: New Zealand
- Original language: English

Production
- Executive producer: Brian Neal Ric Salizzo
- Running time: 60 min (including commercials)

Original release
- Network: TV2
- Release: 1996 – November 23, 2005
- Release: July 9, 2008 – 2011

SportsCafe is a New Zealand sports TV show. The show's original run was hosted by Lana Coc-Kroft, Marc Ellis, Leigh Hart, Graeme Hill, Ric Salizzo and reporter Eva Evguenieva. In 2001 Leigh Hart was added to the cast under his persona of 'That Guy'.

The show first screened on New Zealand television in 1996 on Sky Sport; however, those without a Sky subscription could view SportsCafe without a UHF Sky decoder by tuning their TV to the Sky Sport UHF channel, as the signal was not scrambled during this show. In 2002, SportsCafe moved to Sky 1, but it did not attract enough ratings, causing it to move to the free-to-air market, where it moved in February 2003 to TV2 (TVNZ 2).

It featured interviews with current sports stars and comical skits about sports. Each episode lasted 60 minutes, including commercials.

The show was pulled at the end of 2005 after the 'Celebrity Drug Scandal' but it is understood that this was not the reason for the show going off the air. The grand final screened November 23, 2005 and at the end of the show the presenters actually destroyed the set on the air, as The Exponents played their hit song "Why Does Love Do This to Me?".

On Sunday June 22, 2008, it was announced in the Herald on Sunday newspaper that SportsCafe would return for a final season, to begin on July 9, 2008. The show featured most of the original cast, and aired on Wednesday nights at 9.30 pm on TV2.

In 2011, SportsCafe returned for three exclusive online episodes, in order to celebrate New Zealand's hosting of the Rugby World Cup later in the year. Three shows were confirmed, and broadcast on July 8, 15 and 22. Recordings of these episodes can be found on YouTube.

The filming location was Leftfield on Auckland's Waterfront.

== National Nude Day ==
"National Nude Day" was a mock public holiday created when Marc Ellis challenged SportsCafe viewers to streak in front of then Prime Minister Helen Clark. The show ran an event each year inviting viewers to submit photos and video of themselves performing daily activities in the nude, which was continued on the internet (rebranded as "World Nude Day" or "International Nude Day") until around 2009. A number of student pubs in Ellis' home town of Dunedin offered special deals for nude patrons on the day. Internet collections of world holidays mark the day as 14 July; in fact it was held at the organizers' whim, having variously fallen on 19 September and 6 February.
