= Healtheries =

New Zealand-based health food and supplement manufacturer

Healtheries is a New Zealand-based health food and supplement manufacturer. It was founded in 1904.

== Information ==
The company is based in Auckland, New Zealand and has over 200 staff nationwide. In 2007, Healtheries joined a partnership with the company of Nutra-Life in order to form the new company called Vitaco. In 2012, Healtheries joined with The Wiggles in order to promote healthy eating that is targeted towards children of preschool age. The food that is associated with The Wiggles contains hidden veggies.

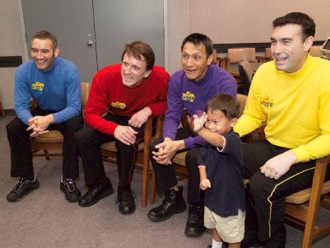
The Wiggles who are associated with Healtheries directed towards children

== Controversy ==
Healtheries Kidscare Rice Wheels Multipacks had a national recall of the product due to glass being found in three separate packages. There was no recorded reason as to how the glass made its way into the packages. There were no injuries found in this recall. It only recalled packages that had 1 April 2013 as its best-before date.
