= Marc Ellis (rugby) =

NZ dual-rugby international player

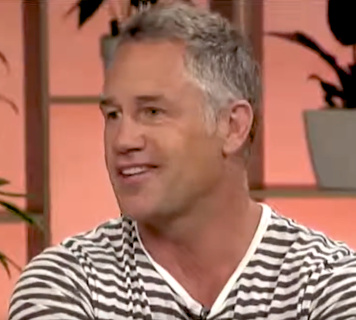
- Born: Marc Christopher Gwynne Ellis; 8 October 1971 (age 55) Wellington, New Zealand
- Height: 1.78 m (5 ft 10 in)
- Weight: 82 kg (12 st 13 lb)
- School: Wellington College
- University: University of Otago
- Notable relative: Mick Williment (uncle)

Rugby union career
- Position: Utility back
Provincial / State sides
Years	Team	Apps	(Points)
1991–1995	Otago	66	(161)
1998–2000	North Harbour	24	(76)
1999	Blues	9	(5)
2000	Highlanders	11	(15)
- Correct as of 7 November 2018
International career
Years	Team	Apps	(Points)
1991	New Zealand Colts	3	(4)
1992–1995	New Zealand	21	(98)
- Rugby league career

Playing information
- Position: Utility back
Club
Years	Team	Pld	T	G	FG	P
1996–97	Auckland Warriors	36	11			103
Representative
Years	Team	Pld	T	G	FG	P
1996	New Zealand	5	2			8

Marc Christopher Gwynne Ellis (born 8 October 1971) is a New Zealand businessman, television presenter, and former rugby union and rugby league player who played in the 1990s and 2000s.

He represented New Zealand in both rugby union and rugby league. During the 1995 Rugby World Cup he scored six tries for New Zealand against Japan, which is the record for the most tries by a player in a World Cup match. From 1996 to 1998 he played rugby league for the Auckland Warriors.

A graduate of the University of Otago, his primary business interest was in Charlie's, a juice company which was founded in 1999 and sold to Asahi in 2011.

== Rugby union ==
Ellis started out for Otago in 1991, and earned selection for New Zealand (the All Blacks) in 1992. In 1995 Ellis was recalled to the All Blacks for the World Cup, playing five games on the wing. He scored seven tries in the tournament, six of them in the 145–17 win over Japan. Ellis stayed with Otago until 1995 when he switched code to rugby league.

== Rugby league ==
At the end of the 1995 season Ellis switched to league to play for the Auckland Warriors. He played for the Warriors between 1996 and 1998, also representing New Zealand in five matches.

== Super 12 ==
Ellis returned to rugby union in 1998, playing in the Super 12 for North Harbour, the Blues, and the Highlanders before retiring from rugby.

== Post-playing career ==
In the early 2000s, Ellis was a popular figure on New Zealand television, often appearing alongside fellow former rugby union and league player Matthew Ridge, notably on light-hearted documentaries. In 2004, as part of a one such programme, Ellis took part in and won the famous and eccentric British annual event, the Cooper's Hill Cheese-Rolling and Wake.

From 1996 to 2005 Ellis was a regular presenter on the TV2 talk show SportsCafe, where he was known for his "larrikin" personality. In 2003 he inaugurated the mock public holiday "National Nude Day" by challenging viewers to streak in front of then Prime Minister Helen Clark.

In 2005, Ellis purchased ecstasy tablets from a drug dealer who was under surveillance by the New Zealand Police. Ellis was among many high-profile figures caught in the operation, code-named Aqua. His court appearance put an end to a poorly-kept secret, as despite the fact he had originally obtained name suppression, his identity was widely known by the New Zealand public. Ellis was fined $300.

In 2006, he released his autobiography Crossing the Line. Ellis has since co-authored Good Fullas: A Guide to Kiwi Blokes, released in 2010 with friend and New Zealand Consul General to Italy, Charlie Haddrell.

On 15 November 2007, as part of an elaborate marketing ploy for his latest business venture, Ellis detonated 600 kg of explosives on top of Rangitoto Island, a nature reserve in Auckland's Waitematā Harbour. This was an attempt to create an illusion that the volcanic island was erupting. The New Zealand Department of Conservation described the stunt as "demoralising and very disappointing". There is a total fire ban on the island because of ecological significance.

In 2010 the Gardens Tavern, then a popular student pub in North Dunedin, was advertised for sale; Ellis attempted to buy it but was outbid by the University of Otago, who converted it into a study centre. The university student magazine Critic alleges that the University bought it for the specific purpose of keeping it out of Ellis' hands.
