= Chloe Wright =

New Zealand businesswoman and philanthropist

Chloe Wright ONZM
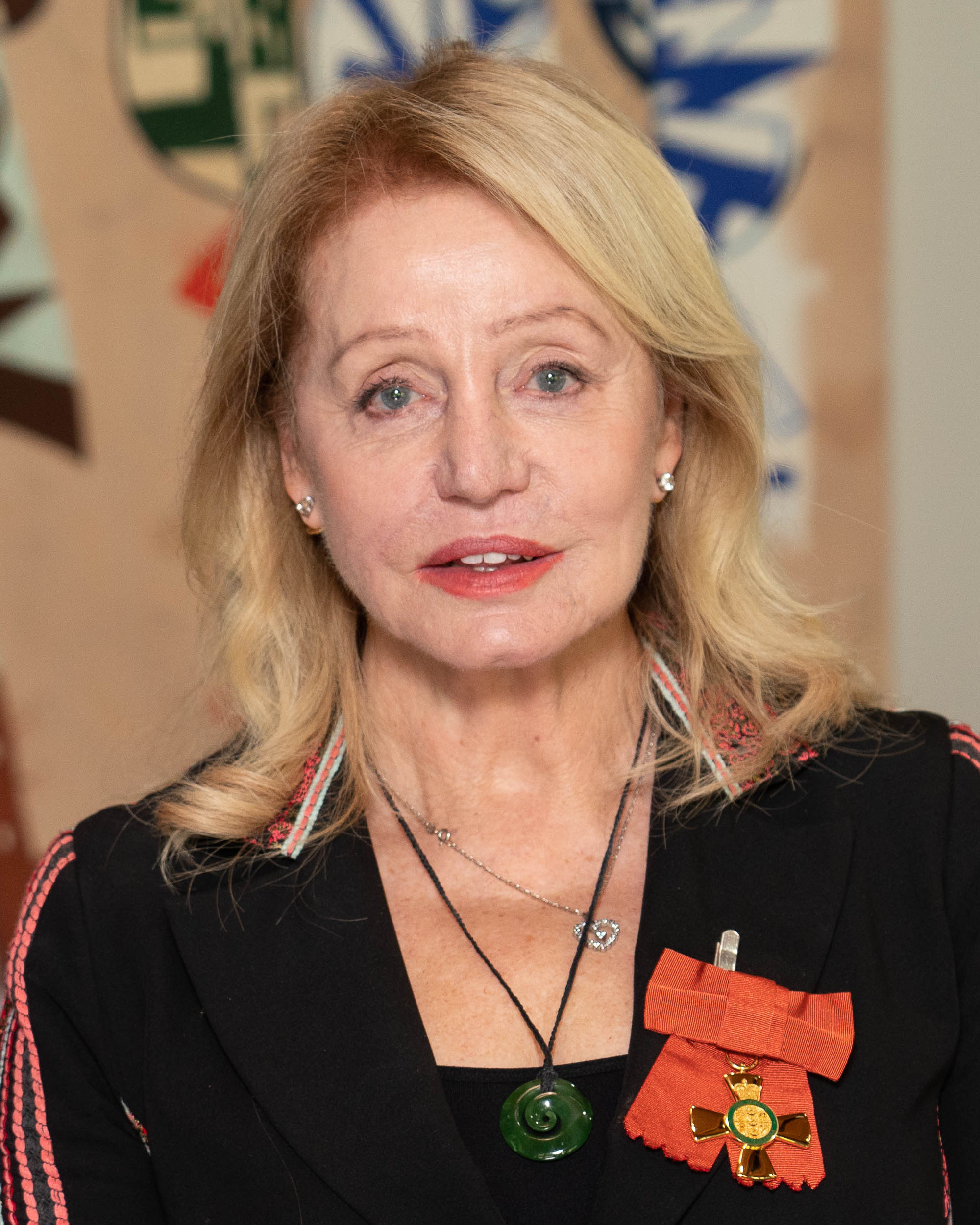
- Wright in 2021
- Born: 1947 or 1948
- Died: 24 September 2023 (aged 75)
- Education: University of Texas
- Spouse: Wayne Wright

Chloe Angela Carol Wright ONZM (1947 or 1948 – 24 September 2023) was a New Zealand businesswoman and philanthropist. Along with her husband Wayne, she co-founded BestStart in 1996, the largest early-childhood education franchise in New Zealand.

== Early life and family ==
Wright grew up in a state house in Lower Hutt. Her father worked for the post office, and her mother was a stay-at-home mum.

Wright married Wayne Wright at a self-declared "very young" age, and the couple had five children.

== Career ==
In 1975, Wright and her husband started a kiwifruit orchard in Te Puna, and later formed kiwifruit orchard syndicates until a tax deductibility change was made by the government in 1982. Also in 1982, they built their home in Ōmokoroa. They started a crib-wall manufacturing business in Escondido, California, in 1978. After they had issues with their kiwifruit production, they sold their New Zealand assets and moved to Austin, Texas; Wright went on to graduate from the University of Texas. They soon were able to expand their crib-wall business to Mexico. In 1990, they started a telecommunications company in Mobile, Alabama.

Wright and her husband founded BestStart in 1996, then known as KidiCorp. It is New Zealand's largest early-childhood education franchise. It has 260 centres and receives $200 million of government funding annually.

In 2022, the Wright family acquired 75% of Sean Plunket's radio station The Platform. They had a portfolio of more than 75 properties in 2022. In 2022, the Wrights appeared on the NBR Rich List, a list of the richest families and people in New Zealand, with a reported net worth at $360 million.

Wright started a lobby group named Mother's Matter. She was chief executive and trustee of the Wright Family Foundation and funded various organisations. She also started four birthing centres where low-risk women can stay for free. Wright believed that this should be taxpayer-funded. The Tauranga centre, known as the Bethlehem Birthing Centre, was opened by former prime minister John Key. There were 431 births and 803 postnatal stays at this centre in 2021.

In the 2021 New Year Honours, Wright was appointed an Officer of the New Zealand Order of Merit, for services to philanthropy, education and health.

== Death ==
Wright died on 23 September 2023, at the age of 75. Her husband, Wayne Wright, died in 2026.
